= List of CDMA terminology =

This article contains terminology related to CDMA International Roaming. To quickly find a term, click on the first letter of the term below:

# | A | B | C | D | E | F | G | H | I | J | K | L | M | N | O | P | Q | R | S | T | U | V | W | X | Y | Z

== # ==
1x – See 1xRTT

1xEV-DO – cdma2000 Evolution, Data Optimized

1xRTT – cdma2000 Radio Transmission Technology

2G Authentication – See CAVE-based Authentication

3G Authentication – See AKA

3GPP2 – Third Generation Partnership Project 2

== A ==
A12 Authentication

AAA – Authentication, Authorization, and Accounting

AC – Authentication Center – See CAVE-based Authentication

Access Authentication

Acquisition_Table – See PRL

Active Pilot – base station(s) currently serving a call. A base station usually has 3 pilot numbers. Also See PN Offset.

AKA – Authentication and Key Agreement

A-key – Authentication Key – See CAVE-based Authentication

AMPS – Advanced Mobile Phone System

AN – Access Network

ANI – Automatic Number Identification

ANID – Access Network Identifiers

ANSI – American National Standards Institute

ANSI-41 – See IS-41

ARP – Authorized Receipt Point

ARPU – Average revenue per user

AT – Access Terminal

Authentication

Authorization

Automatic Call Delivery

Automatic Roaming

Autonomous Registration

== B ==
Band

Bandclass

BID – Billing Identification

Bilateral Roaming

BILLID – BillingID

Border System

== C ==
Call Disconnect

Caller ID

Call Release

Call termination

Carrier

CAVE – Cellular Authentication and Voice Encryption

CAVE-based Authentication

CDG – CDMA Development Group

CDMA – Code Division Multiple Access

CDR – Call Detail Record

Cell site

CIBER – Cellular Intercarrier Billing Exchange Roamer

Cibernet

CHAP – Challenge- Handshake Authentication Protocol aka (HDR – High Data Rate)

Clearing

Clearinghouse

CLI – Calling Line Identification – See Caller ID

CLIP – Calling Line Identification Presentation – See Caller ID

CLLI – Common Language Location Identifier

Clone

Closed PRL – See PRL

CoA – Care-of-Address – See Mobile IP

CND – Caller Number Display – See Caller ID

CNID – Calling Number Identification – See Caller ID

CRX – CDMA Packet Data Roaming Exchange

CSCF – Call Session Control Function – See IMS

CTIA – Cellular Telecom. & Internet Association

== D ==
D-AMPS – Digital Analog Mobile Phone Service

DES – Data Encryption Standard

Diameter

DO – See 1xEV-DO

DRRR – Direct Routing for Roamer to Roamer

Dual-mode handset (i.e. dual-mode mobile phones)

== E ==
eHRPD – Enhanced HRPD

EDI – Electronic Data Interchange

EDT – Electronic Data Transfer

Encryption

Enhanced PRL

ERI – Enhanced Roaming Indicator – See Roaming Indicator

ESA – Enhanced Subscriber Authentication – See AKA

ESN – Electronic Serial Number

ESPM – Extended System Parameters Message

EV-DO – See 1xEV-DO

== F ==
FA – Foreign Agent – See Mobile IP

FCC – U.S. Federal Communications Commission

Financial Settlement

FOTA – Firmware Over-the-Air – See OTA

Frequency Block

== G ==
Global Challenge – See CAVE-based Authentication

Global Title

GTT – Global Title Translation

== H ==
HA – Home Agent – See Mobile IP

Handoff (data)

Handoff (voice)

HLR – Home Location Register

Home Address – See Mobile IP

Home System

HNI – Home Network Identifier – See IMSI

Home SID/NID List

HRPD – High Rate Packet Data – See 1xEV-DO

HRPD Session

HSS – Home Subscriber Server – See IMS

Hybrid Device

== I ==
ICCID – Integrated Circuit Card IDentifier (sim card Number)

IETF – Internet Engineering Task Force

IFAST – International Forum on ANSI-41 Standards Technology

IIF – Interworking and Interoperability Function

IMEI – International mobile equipment Identity

IMS – IP Multimedia Subsystem

IMSI – International Mobile Subscriber Identity

IMSI 11 12 – Same as MNC (Mobile Network Code)

IMSI S – Short IMSI, Mobile Identification Number

Inbound Roamer

Industry Organizations

INF – Industry Negative File

Interconnection

Inter standard roaming

IRM – International roaming MIN

IS-2000 – Superseded by TIA-2000

IS-41 – Superseded by TIA-41

IS-835

IS-856 – Superseded by TIA-856

IS-95

ISG – International Signaling Gateway

ISUP – Integrated Services User Part

ITU – International Telecommunication Union

== J ==
J-STD-038

== K ==
Key

== L ==
L2TP – Layer 2 Tunneling Protocol

LAC – L2TP Access Concentrator – See L2TP

Line Range

LNS – L2TP Network Server – See L2TP

== M ==
MABEL – Major Account Billing Exchange Logistical

Main Service Instance – See Service Instance

MAP – Mobile Application Part – See TIA-41

MBI – MIN Block Identifier

MC – Message Center – See SMS

MCC – Mobile Country Code

MDN – Mobile Directory Number

ME – Mobile Equipment

MEID – Mobile Equipment Identifier

MIN – Mobile Identification Number

MIP – Mobile IP – See Mobile IP

MMD – Multimedia Domain

MMS – Multimedia Messaging Service

MN – Mobile Node

MNC – Mobile Network Code

MN ID – Mobile Node Identifier – See A12 Authentication

Mobile IP

MS – Mobile Station

MSC – Mobile Switching Center

MSCID – Mobile Switching Center Identification

MSCIN – MSC Identification Number

MSID – Mobile Station Identity

MSIN – Mobile Subscription Identification Number, same as MIN

MSISDN – Mobile Station Integrated Services Digital Network Number

MSL – Master Subsidy Lock

MTSO – Mobile Telephone Switching Office – See MSC

Multi-Band Handset

Multi-Mode Handset

== N ==
NAI – Network Access Identifier

NAM – Number Assignment Module

NANP – North American Numbering Plan

Negative System – See PRL

Net Settlement

NID – Network Identification Number

NMSI – National Mobile Station Identity

NMSID – National Mobile Station IDentity, Same as NMSI

NPA-NXX – See NANP

== O ==
OMA – Open Mobile Alliance

Open PRL – See PRL

OTAPA – Over The Air Parameter Administration

OTASP – Over The Air Service Provisioning

OTA – Over-The-Air Programming

Outbound Roamer

== P ==
PAP – Password Authentication Protocol

Packet Data Service

Packet Data Service Option

Packet Data Session

PCS – Personal Communications Services

PDSN – packet data serving node

Permissive Mode – See PRL

PIN – Personal Identification Number – See RVR

Plus Code Dialing

PN Offset – Identifies a base station. As base station usually has 3 pilot numbers. Also See Active Pilot.

Point of Attachment – See Mobile IP

PPP – Point-to-Point Protocol

PPP Service Instance – See Service Instance

PPP Session – Point-to-Point Protocol Session

Preferred System – See PRL

PRL – Preferred Roaming List

Profiling

PUZL – Preferred User Zone List

PZID – Packet Zone Identification

== R ==
RADIUS – Remote Authentication Dial In User Service

RADIUS Server – See AAA

RAN – Radio Access Network – See AN

Restrictive Mode – See PRL

RFC – Request For Comments

RN – Radio Network – See AN

RoamEx

Roaming

Roaming Agreement

Roaming Indicator

RSP – Roaming Service Provider

RUIM – Removable User Identity Module

RVR – Roamer Verification and Reinstatement

== S ==
Sector ID

Service Instance

Service Option

Serving System

SID – System ID

SID/NID Lockout List

SIP – Session Initiation Protocol

SMS – Short Message Service

SMSC – Short Message Service Centre – See SMS

Soft Handoff

SO33 – Service Option 33 – See Service Option

SO59 – Service Option 59 – See Service Option

SPC – Service Programming Code, same as MSL (Master Subsidy Lock)

SPASM – Subscriber Parameter Administration Security Mechanism

SPC – Service Programming Code

Subnet ID

Supplementary Services

SSPR – System Selection for Preferred Roaming

System table – See PRL

== T ==
TDS – Technical Data Sheet

Telcordia

TIA – Telecommunications Industry Association

TIA-2000

TIA-41 – Cellular Radio-Telecommunications Intersystem Operations

TIA-856

TIA-878

TLDN – Temporary Local Directory Number

TMSI – Temporary Mobile Station Identity

Triple DES – Triple Data Encryption Standard

Trading Partner Agreements

== U ==
UDR – Usage Data Records

UIM – User Identity Module – See RUIM

UIMID – UIM Identifier – See RUIM

Unique Challenge – See CAVE-based Authentication

== V ==
Verification – See RVR

Visited System

VLR – Visitor Location Register

== W ==
WIN – Wireless Intelligent Network

WCDMA – Wideband Code Division Multiple Access

== X ==
X0 Records – See CIBER

X2 Records – See CIBER
