= List of wireless network protocols =

A wide variety of different wireless data technologies exist, some in direct competition with one another, others designed for specific applications. Wireless technologies can be evaluated by a variety of different metrics of which some are described in this entry.

Standards can be grouped as follows in increasing range order:

Personal area network (PAN) systems are intended for short range communication between devices typically controlled by a single person. Some examples include wireless headsets for mobile phones or wireless heart rate sensors communicating with a wrist watch. Some of these technologies include standards such as ANT UWB, Bluetooth, Zigbee, and Wireless USB.

Wireless Sensor Networks (WSN / WSAN) are, generically, networks of low-power, low-cost devices that interconnect wirelessly to collect, exchange, and sometimes act-on data collected from their physical environments - "sensor networks". Nodes typically connect in a star or mesh topology. While most individual nodes in a WSAN are expected to have limited range (Bluetooth, Zigbee, 6LoWPAN, etc.), particular nodes may be capable of more expansive communications (Wi-Fi, Cellular networks, etc.) and any individual WSAN can span a wide geographical range. An example of a WSAN would be a collection of sensors arranged throughout an agricultural facility to monitor soil moisture levels, report the data back to a computer in the main office for analysis and trend modeling, and maybe turn on automatic watering spigots if the level is too low.

For wider area communications, wireless local area network (WLAN) is used. WLANs are often known by their commercial product name Wi-Fi. These systems are used to provide wireless access to other systems on the local network such as other computers, shared printers, and other such devices or even the internet. Typically a WLAN offers much better speeds and delays within the local network than an average consumer's Internet access. Older systems that provide WLAN functionality include DECT and HIPERLAN. These however are no longer in widespread use. One typical characteristic of WLANs is that they are mostly very local, without the capability of seamless movement from one network to another.

Cellular networks or WAN are designed for citywide/national/global coverage areas and seamless mobility from one access point (often defined as a base station) to another allowing seamless coverage for very wide areas. Cellular network technologies are often split into 2nd generation 2G, 3G and 4G networks. Originally 2G networks were voice centric or even voice only digital cellular systems (as opposed to the analog 1G networks). Typical 2G standards include GSM and IS-95 with extensions via GPRS, EDGE and 1xRTT, providing Internet access to users of originally voice centric 2G networks. Both EDGE and 1xRTT are 3G standards, as defined by the ITU, but are usually marketed as 2.9G due to their comparatively low speeds and high delays when compared to true 3G technologies.

True 3G systems such as EV-DO, W-CDMA (including HSPA and HSPA+) provide combined circuit switched and packet switched data and voice services from the outset, usually at far better data rates than 2G networks with their extensions. All of these services can be used to provide combined mobile voice access and Internet access at remote locations.

4G networks provide even higher bitrates and many architectural improvements, which are not necessarily visible to the consumer. The current 4G systems that are deployed widely are WIMAX and LTE. The two are pure packet based networks without traditional voice circuit capabilities. These networks provide voice services via VoIP or VoLTE.

Some systems are designed for point-to-point line-of-sight communications, once two such nodes get too far apart they can no longer communicate. Other systems are designed to form a wireless mesh network using one of a variety of routing protocols. In a mesh network, when nodes get too far apart to communicate directly, they can still communicate indirectly through intermediate nodes.

== Standards ==
The following standards are included in this comparison.

=== Wireless wide area network (WWAN) ===
- EDGE
- EV-DO x1 Rev 0, Rev A, Rev B and x3 standards.
- Flash-OFDM: FLASH (Fast Low-latency Access with Seamless Handoff)-OFDM (Orthogonal Frequency Division Multiplexing)
- GPRS
- HSPA D and U standards.
- Lorawan
- LTE
- RTT
- UMTS over W-CDMA
- UMTS-TDD
- WiMAX: 802.16 standard
- Narrowband IoT
- NR

=== Wireless local area network (WLAN) ===
- Wi-Fi: 802.11a, 802.11b, 802.11g, 802.11n, 802.11ac, 802.11ax standards. 580- 771-8271

=== Wireless personal area network (WPAN) and most wireless sensor actor networks (WSAN) ===
- 6LoWPAN
- Bluetooth V4.0 with standard protocol and with low energy protocol
- IEEE 802.15.4-2006 (low-level protocol definitions corresponding to the OSI model physical and link layers. Zigbee, 6LoWPAN, etc. build upward in the protocol stack and correspond to the network and transport layers.)
- Thread (network protocol)
- UWB
- Wireless USB
- Zigbee
- ANT+
- MiraOS a wireless mesh network from LumenRadio

== Overview ==
Comparison of mobile Internet access methods
Common name	Family	Primary use	Radio tech	Downstream (Mbit/s)	Upstream (Mbit/s)	Notes
HSPA+	3GPP	Mobile Internet	CDMA/TDMA/FDD; MIMO	21; 42; 84; 672	5.8; 11.5; 22; 168	HSPA+ is widely deployed. Revision 11 of the 3GPP states that HSPA+ is expected to have a throughput capacity of 672 Mbit/s.
LTE	3GPP	Mobile Internet	OFDMA/TDMA/MIMO/SC-FDMA/for LTE-FDD/for LTE-TDD	100 Cat3; 150 Cat4; 300 Cat5; 25065 Cat17; 1658 Cat19 (in 20 MHz FDD)	50 Cat3/4; 75 Cat5; 2119 Cat17; 13563 Cat19 (in 20 MHz FDD)	LTE-Advanced Pro offers rates in excess of 3 Gbit/s to mobile users.
WiMax rel 1	802.16	WirelessMAN	MIMO-SOFDMA	37 (10 MHz TDD)	17 (10 MHz TDD)	With 2x2 MIMO.
WiMax rel 1.5	802.16-2009	WirelessMAN	MIMO-SOFDMA	83 (20 MHz TDD); 141 (2x20 MHz FDD)	46 (20 MHz TDD); 138 (2x20 MHz FDD)	With 2x2 MIMO.Enhanced with 20 MHz channels in 802.16-2009
WiMAX rel 2.0	802.16m	WirelessMAN	MIMO-SOFDMA	2x2 MIMO; 110 (20 MHz TDD); 183 (2x20 MHz FDD); 4x4 MIMO; 219 (20 MHz TDD); 365 (2x20 MHz FDD)	2x2 MIMO; 70 (20 MHz TDD); 188 (2x20 MHz FDD); 4x4 MIMO; 140 (20 MHz TDD); 376 (2x20 MHz FDD)	Also, low mobility users can aggregate multiple channels to get a download throughput of up to 1 Gbit/s
Flash-OFDM	Flash-OFDM	Mobile Internet mobility up to 200 mph (350 km/h)	Flash-OFDM	5.3; 10.6; 15.9	1.8; 3.6; 5.4	Mobile range 30 km (18 miles); Extended range 55 km (34 miles)
HIPERMAN	HIPERMAN	Mobile Internet	OFDM	56.9		
Wi-Fi	802.11 (11ax)	Wireless LAN	OFDM/OFDMA/CSMA/MIMO/MU-MIMO/Half duplex	9600 Wi-Fi 6		Antenna, RF front end enhancements and minor protocol timer tweaks have helped deploy long range P2P networks compromising on radial coverage, throughput and/or spectra efficiency (310 km & 382 km)
iBurst	802.20	Mobile Internet	HC-SDMA/TDD/MIMO	95	36	Cell Radius: 3–12 km Speed: 250 km/h Spectral Efficiency: 13 bits/s/Hz/cell; Spectrum Reuse Factor: "1"
EDGE Evolution	GSM	Mobile Internet	TDMA/FDD	1.6	0.5	3GPP Release 7
UMTS W-CDMA HSPA (HSDPA+HSUPA)	3GPP	Mobile Internet	CDMA/FDD CDMA/FDD/MIMO	0.384; 14.4	0.384; 5.76	HSDPA is widely deployed. Typical downlink rates today 2 Mbit/s, ~200 kbit/s uplink; HSPA+ downlink up to 56 Mbit/s.
UMTS-TDD	3GPP	Mobile Internet	CDMA/TDD	16		Reported speeds according to IPWireless using 16QAM modulation similar to HSDPA+HSUPA
EV-DO Rel. 0 EV-DO Rev.A EV-DO Rev.B	3GPP2	Mobile Internet	CDMA/FDD	2.45; 3.1; 4.9xN	0.15; 1.8; 1.8xN	Rev B note: N is the number of 1.25 MHz carriers used. EV-DO is not designed for voice, and requires a fallback to 1xRTT when a voice call is placed or received.

Notes: All speeds are theoretical maximums and will vary by a number of factors, including the use of external antennas, distance from the tower and the ground speed (e.g. communications on a train may be poorer than when standing still). Usually the bandwidth is shared between several terminals. The performance of each technology is determined by a number of constraints, including the spectral efficiency of the technology, the cell sizes used, and the amount of spectrum available.

For more comparison tables, see bit rate progress trends, comparison of mobile phone standards, spectral efficiency comparison table and OFDM system comparison table.

== Peak bit rate and throughput ==
When discussing throughput, there is often a distinction between the peak data rate of the physical layer, the theoretical maximum data throughput and typical throughput.

The peak bit rate of the standard is the net bit rate provided by the physical layer in the fastest transmission mode (using the fastest modulation scheme and error code), excluding forward error correction coding and other physical layer overhead.

The theoretical maximum throughput for end user is clearly lower than the peak data rate due to higher layer overheads. Even this is never possible to achieve unless the test is done under perfect laboratory conditions.

The typical throughput is what users have experienced most of the time when well within the usable range to the base station. The typical throughput is hard to measure, and depends on many protocol issues such as transmission schemes (slower schemes are used at longer distance from the access point due to better redundancy), packet retransmissions and packet size. The typical throughput is often even lower because of other traffic sharing the same network or cell, interference or even the fixed line capacity from the base station onwards being limited.

Note that these figures cannot be used to predict the performance of any given standard in any given environment, but rather as benchmarks against which actual experience might be compared.

Bit rate (Mbit/s)
Standard	Peak Downlink	Peak Uplink	Approximate Maximum Range in Meters	Typical Downlink throughput
CDMA2000 1xRTT	0.3072	0.1536	29000	0.125
CDMA2000 EV-DO Rev. 0	2.4580	0.1536	29000	1
CDMA2000 EV-DO Rev. A	3.1	1.8	29000	2
CDMA2000 EV-DO Rev. B	4.9	1.8	29000	
GSM GPRS Class 10	0.0856	0.0428	26000	0.014
GSM EDGE type 2	0.4736	0.4736	26000	0.034
GSM Evolved EDGE	1.8944	0.9472	26000	
UMTS W-CDMA R99	0.3840	0.3840	29000	0.195
UMTS W-CDMA HSDPA	14.4	0.3840	200000	2
UMTS W-CDMA HSUPA	14.4	5.76	200000	
UMTS W-CDMA HSPA+	168	22	200000	
UMTS-TDD	16	16		
LTE	326.4	86.4		
iBurst: iBurst	24	8	12000	>2
Flash-OFDM: Flash-OFDM	5.3	1.8	29000	avg 2.5
WiMAX: 802.16e	70	70	6400	>10
WiFi: 802.11a	54	54	30	20
WiFi: 802.11b	11	11	30	5
WiFi: 802.11g	54	54	30	20
WiFi: 802.11n	600	600	50	
WiFi: 802.11ac	1,300	1,300	50	
WiFi: 802.11ad	7,000	7,000	3.3	
WiFi: 802.11ax	10,000	10,000		

- Downlink is the throughput from the base station to the user handset or computer.
- Uplink is the throughput from the user handset or computer to the base station.
- Range is the maximum range possible to receive data at 25% of the typical rate.

== Typical spectral use ==
=== Frequency ===
Allocated frequencies
Standard	Frequencies	Spectrum Type
UMTS FDD	850 MHz, 900 MHz, 2.0, 1.9/2.1, 2.1, and 1.7/2.1 GHz	Licensed
UMTS-TDD	450, 850 MHz, 1.9, 2, 2.5, and 3.5 GHz; 2 GHz	Licensed (Cellular, 3G TDD, BRS/IMT-ext, FWA); Unlicensed (see note)
CDMA2000 (inc. EV-DO, 1xRTT)	450, 850, 900 MHz 1.7, 1.8, 1.9, and 2.1 GHz	Licensed (Cellular/PCS/3G/AWS)
EDGE/GPRS	850 MHz, 900 MHz, 1.8 GHz, and 1.9 GHz	Licensed (Cellular/PCS/PCN)
iBurst	1.8, 1.9, and 2.1 GHz	Licensed
Flash-OFDM	450 and 870 MHz	Licensed
Bluetooth/BLE	2.4 GHz	Unlicensed ISM
Low Rate WPAN (802.15.4)	868 MHz, 915 MHz, 2.4 GHz	Unlicensed ISM
802.11	2.4, 3.6, 4.9, 5.0, 5.2, 5.6, 5.8, 5.9 and 60 GHz	Unlicensed ISM
WiMax (802.16e)	2.3, 2.5, 3.5, 3.7, and 5.8 GHz	Licensed
Wireless USB, UWB	3.1 to 10.6 GHz	Unlicensed Ultrawideband
VEmesh*	868 MHz, 915 MHz, and 953 MHz	Unlicensed ISM
EnOcean*	868.3 MHz	Unlicensed ISM

== See also ==
- Comparison of mobile phone standards
- List of computer standards
- List of interface bit rates
- OFDM system comparison table
- Spectral efficiency comparison table
- Near-field communication (NFC)
- Radio-frequency identification (RFID)
- Consumer IR (CIR)
