= Comparison of mobile phone standards =

Cellular network standards and generation timeline.

This is a comparison of standards of wireless networking technologies for devices such as mobile phones. A new generation of cellular standards has appeared approximately every tenth year since 1G systems were introduced in 1979 and the early to mid-1980s.

== Issues ==
Global System for Mobile Communications (GSM, around 80–85% market share) and IS-95 (around 10–15% market share) were the two most prevalent 2G mobile communication technologies in 2007. In 3G, the most prevalent technology was UMTS with CDMA-2000 in close contention.

All radio access technologies have to solve the same problems: to divide the finite RF spectrum among multiple users as efficiently as possible. GSM uses TDMA and FDMA for user and cell separation. UMTS, IS-95 and CDMA-2000 use CDMA. WiMAX and LTE use OFDM.

- Time-division multiple access (TDMA) provides multiuser access by chopping up the channel into sequential time slices. Each user of the channel takes turns to transmit and receive signals. In reality, only one person is actually using the channel at a specific moment. This is analogous to time-sharing on a large computer server.
- Frequency-division multiple access (FDMA) provides multiuser access by separating the used frequencies. This is used in GSM to separate cells, which then use TDMA to separate users within the cell.
- Code-division multiple access (CDMA) This uses a digital modulation called spread spectrum which spreads the voice data over a very wide channel in pseudorandom fashion using a user or cell specific pseudorandom code. The receiver undoes the randomization to collect the bits together and produce the original data. As the codes are pseudorandom and selected in such a way as to cause minimal interference to one another, multiple users can talk at the same time and multiple cells can share the same frequency. This causes an added signal noise forcing all users to use more power, which in exchange decreases cell range and battery life.
- Orthogonal frequency-division multiple access (OFDMA) uses bundling of multiple small frequency bands that are orthogonal to one another to provide for separation of users. The users are multiplexed in the frequency domain by allocating specific sub-bands to individual users. This is often enhanced by also performing TDMA and changing the allocation periodically so that different users get different sub-bands at different times.

In theory, CDMA, TDMA and FDMA have exactly the same spectral efficiency but practically, each has its own challenges – power control in the case of CDMA, timing in the case of TDMA, and frequency generation/filtering in the case of FDMA.

For a classic example for understanding the fundamental difference of TDMA and CDMA, imagine a cocktail party where couples are talking to each other in a single room. The room represents the available bandwidth:

TDMA: A speaker takes turns talking to a listener. The speaker talks for a short time and then stops to let another couple talk. There is never more than one speaker talking in the room, no one has to worry about two conversations mixing. The drawback is that it limits the practical number of discussions in the room (bandwidth wise).

CDMA: any speaker can talk at any time; however each uses a different language. Each listener can only understand the language of their partner. As more and more couples talk, the background noise (representing the noise floor) gets louder, but because of the difference in languages, conversations do not mix. The drawback is that at some point, one cannot talk any louder. After this if the noise still rises (more people join the party/cell) the listener cannot make out what the talker is talking about without coming closer to the talker. In effect, CDMA cell coverage decreases as the number of active users increases. This is called cell breathing.

== Comparison ==
Generation	Technology	Feature	Encoding	Year of First Use	Roaming	Handset interoperability	Common Interference	Signal quality/coverage area	Frequency utilization/Call density	Handoff	Voice and Data at the same time
1G	FDMA	NMT	Analog	1981	Nordics and several other European countries	None	None	Good coverage due to low frequencies	Very low density	Hard	No
2G	TDMA and FDMA	GSM	Digital	1991	Worldwide, all countries except Japan and South Korea	SIM card	Some electronics, e.g. amplifiers	Good coverage indoors on 850/900 MHz. Repeaters possible. 35 km hard limit.	Very low density	Hard	Yes GPRS Class A
2G	CDMA	IS-95 (CDMA one)	Digital	1995	Limited	None	None	Unlimited cell size, low transmitter power permits large cells	Very low density	Soft	No
3G	CDMA	IS-2000 (CDMA 2000)	Digital	2000 / 2002	Limited	RUIM (rarely used)	None	Unlimited cell size, low transmitter power permits large cells	Very low density	Soft	No EVDO / Yes SVDO
3G	W-CDMA	UMTS (3GSM)	Digital	2001	Worldwide	SIM card	None	Smaller cells and lower indoors coverage on 2100 MHz; equivalent coverage indoors and superior range to GSM on 850/900 MHz.	Very low density	Soft	Yes
4G	OFDMA	LTE	Digital	2009	Worldwide	SIM card	None	Smaller cells and lower coverage on the S band.	Very low density	Hard	No (data only); Voice possible through VoLTE or fallback to 2G/3G
5G	OFDMA	NR	Digital	2018	Limited	SIM card	None	Dense cells on millimeter waves.	Very low density	Hard	No (data only); Voice possible through VoNR

Network compatibility and Standard
Network Compatibility	Standard or Revision
GSM (TDMA, 2G)	GSM (1991), GPRS (2000), EDGE (2003)
cdmaOne (CDMA, 2G)	cdmaOne (1995)
CDMA2000 (CDMA/TDMA, 3G)	EV-DO (1999), Rev. A (2006), Rev. B (2006), SVDO (2011)
UMTS (CDMA, 3G)	UMTS (1999), HSDPA (2005), HSUPA (2007), HSPA+ (2009)
4G	LTE (2009), LTE Advanced (2011), LTE Advanced Pro (2016)
5G	NR (2018)

== GSM and IS-95 compared ==
GSM and IS-95 were the two dominant 2G digital standards, and differed in how they divided the radio resource: GSM combinedTDMA with FDMA, while IS-95 used CDMA. IS-95 carried more users per megahertz of spectrum, used soft handoff between cells, and reduced its transmitted rate during speech pauses, but its coverage area shrank as load increased - an effect known as cell breathing - and most of its underlying patents were held by Qualcomm. GSM penetrated buildings better at 900 MHz and supported repeaters, but was subject to a maximum cell radius imposed by timing constraints.

GSM's decisive advantages proved to be commercial rather than technical. The Subscriber Identity Module separated subscriber identity from the handset, allowing users to change networks or phones at will, whereas IS-95 handsets were bound to a carrier by ESN. GSM was deployed in far more countries, which made international roaming straightforward, and its much larger subscriber base gave manufacturers reason to launch devices on GSM first. By 2007, GSM held roughly 80–85% of the global 2G market against 10–15% for IS-95.

The two families also diverged in their upgrade paths. GSM evolved through GPRS, EDGE and UMTS within 3GPP and on to LTE, while CDMA2000 had no comparable route beyond EV-DO, and operators using it migrated to LTE instead. IS-95 and CDMA2000 networks were progressively decommissioned during the 2010s and early 2020s.

== Development of the market share of mobile standards ==
This graphic compares the market shares of the different mobile standards.

Cellphone subscribers by technology (left Y axis) and total number of subscribers globally (right Y axis)

In a fast-growing market, GSM/3GSM (red) grows faster than the market and is gaining market share, the CDMA family (blue) grows at about the same rate as the market, while other technologies (grey) are being phased out

== Comparison of wireless Internet standards ==
As a reference, a comparison of mobile and non-mobile wireless Internet standards follows.

Comparison of mobile Internet access methods
Common name	Family	Primary use	Radio tech	Downstream (Mbit/s)	Upstream (Mbit/s)	Notes
HSPA+	3GPP	Mobile Internet	CDMA/TDMA/FDD; MIMO	21; 42; 84; 672	5.8; 11.5; 22; 168	HSPA+ is widely deployed. Revision 11 of the 3GPP states that HSPA+ is expected to have a throughput capacity of 672 Mbit/s.
LTE	3GPP	Mobile Internet	OFDMA/TDMA/MIMO/SC-FDMA/for LTE-FDD/for LTE-TDD	100 Cat3; 150 Cat4; 300 Cat5; 25065 Cat17; 1658 Cat19 (in 20 MHz FDD)	50 Cat3/4; 75 Cat5; 2119 Cat17; 13563 Cat19 (in 20 MHz FDD)	LTE-Advanced Pro offers rates in excess of 3 Gbit/s to mobile users.
WiMax rel 1	802.16	WirelessMAN	MIMO-SOFDMA	37 (10 MHz TDD)	17 (10 MHz TDD)	With 2x2 MIMO.
WiMax rel 1.5	802.16-2009	WirelessMAN	MIMO-SOFDMA	83 (20 MHz TDD); 141 (2x20 MHz FDD)	46 (20 MHz TDD); 138 (2x20 MHz FDD)	With 2x2 MIMO.Enhanced with 20 MHz channels in 802.16-2009
WiMAX rel 2.0	802.16m	WirelessMAN	MIMO-SOFDMA	2x2 MIMO; 110 (20 MHz TDD); 183 (2x20 MHz FDD); 4x4 MIMO; 219 (20 MHz TDD); 365 (2x20 MHz FDD)	2x2 MIMO; 70 (20 MHz TDD); 188 (2x20 MHz FDD); 4x4 MIMO; 140 (20 MHz TDD); 376 (2x20 MHz FDD)	Also, low mobility users can aggregate multiple channels to get a download throughput of up to 1 Gbit/s
Flash-OFDM	Flash-OFDM	Mobile Internet mobility up to 200 mph (350 km/h)	Flash-OFDM	5.3; 10.6; 15.9	1.8; 3.6; 5.4	Mobile range 30 km (18 miles); Extended range 55 km (34 miles)
HIPERMAN	HIPERMAN	Mobile Internet	OFDM	56.9		
Wi-Fi	802.11 (11ax)	Wireless LAN	OFDM/OFDMA/CSMA/MIMO/MU-MIMO/Half duplex	9600 Wi-Fi 6		Antenna, RF front end enhancements and minor protocol timer tweaks have helped deploy long range P2P networks compromising on radial coverage, throughput and/or spectra efficiency (310 km & 382 km)
iBurst	802.20	Mobile Internet	HC-SDMA/TDD/MIMO	95	36	Cell Radius: 3–12 km Speed: 250 km/h Spectral Efficiency: 13 bits/s/Hz/cell; Spectrum Reuse Factor: "1"
EDGE Evolution	GSM	Mobile Internet	TDMA/FDD	1.6	0.5	3GPP Release 7
UMTS W-CDMA HSPA (HSDPA+HSUPA)	3GPP	Mobile Internet	CDMA/FDD CDMA/FDD/MIMO	0.384; 14.4	0.384; 5.76	HSDPA is widely deployed. Typical downlink rates today 2 Mbit/s, ~200 kbit/s uplink; HSPA+ downlink up to 56 Mbit/s.
UMTS-TDD	3GPP	Mobile Internet	CDMA/TDD	16		Reported speeds according to IPWireless using 16QAM modulation similar to HSDPA+HSUPA
EV-DO Rel. 0 EV-DO Rev.A EV-DO Rev.B	3GPP2	Mobile Internet	CDMA/FDD	2.45; 3.1; 4.9xN	0.15; 1.8; 1.8xN	Rev B note: N is the number of 1.25 MHz carriers used. EV-DO is not designed for voice, and requires a fallback to 1xRTT when a voice call is placed or received.

Notes: All speeds are theoretical maximums and will vary by a number of factors, including the use of external antennas, distance from the tower and the ground speed (e.g. communications on a train may be poorer than when standing still). Usually the bandwidth is shared between several terminals. The performance of each technology is determined by a number of constraints, including the spectral efficiency of the technology, the cell sizes used, and the amount of spectrum available.

For more comparison tables, see bit rate progress trends, comparison of mobile phone standards, spectral efficiency comparison table and OFDM system comparison table.

== See also ==
- Advanced Mobile Phone System
- Car phone
- List of wireless network protocols
- Spectral efficiency comparison table
- SMS – contain the content of its standardization
