= Phone cloning =

Copying of one cellular device's identity to another

Phone cloning is the copying of a cellular device's identity to another.

== AMPS cloning ==
Analogue mobile telephones were notorious for their lack of security. Casual listeners easily heard conversations as plain narrowband FM; eavesdroppers with specialized equipment readily intercepted handset Electronic Serial Numbers (ESN) and Mobile Directory Numbers (MDN or CTN, the Cellular Telephone Number) over the air. The intercepted ESN/MDN pairs would be cloned onto another handset and used in other regions for making calls. Due to widespread fraud, some carriers required a PIN before making calls or used a system of radio fingerprinting to detect the clones.

== CDMA cloning ==
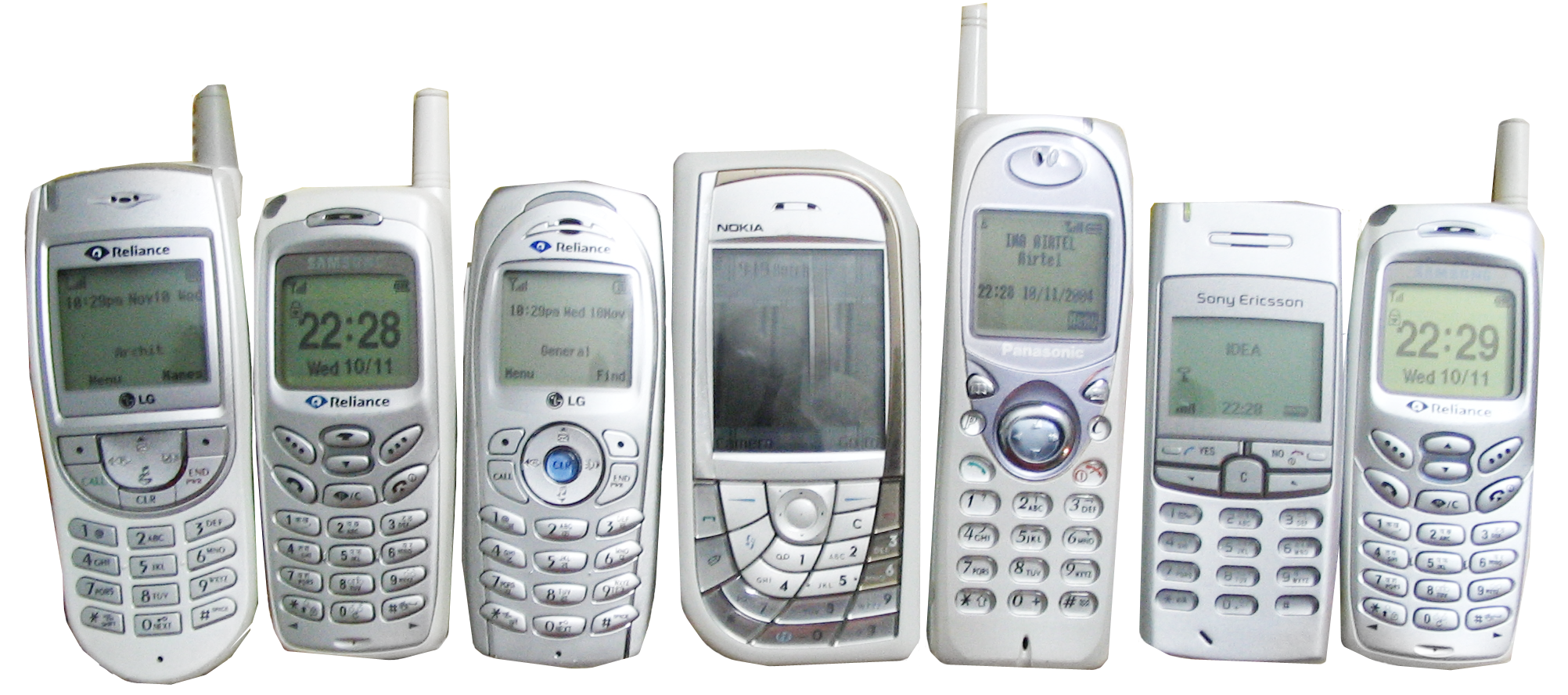
A selection of mobile phones that can be cloned.

Code-Division Multiple Access (CDMA) mobile telephone cloning involves gaining access to the device's embedded file system /nvm/num directory via specialized software or placing a modified EEPROM into the target mobile telephone, allowing the Electronic Serial Number (ESN) and/or Mobile Equipment Identifier (MEID) of the mobile phone to be changed. The MEID is typically obtained by dialling *#06#. The ESN or MEID is typically transmitted to the cellular company's Mobile Telephone Switching Office (MTSO) in order to authenticate a device onto the mobile network. Modifying these, as well as the phone's Preferred Roaming List (PRL) and the mobile identification number, or MIN, can pave the way for fraudulent calls, as the target telephone is now a clone of the telephone from which the original ESN and MIN data were obtained.

== GSM cloning ==
GSM cloning occurs by copying a secret key from the victim SIM card, typically not requiring any internal data from the handset (the phone itself). GSM handsets do not have ESN or MIN, only an International Mobile Equipment Identity (IMEI) number. There are various methods used to obtain the IMEI. The most common method is to eavesdrop on a cellular network.

Older GSM SIM cards can be cloned by performing a cryptographic attack against the COMP128 authentication algorithm used by these older SIM cards. By connecting the SIM card to a computer, the authentication procedure can be repeated many times in order to slowly leak information about the secret key. If this procedure is repeated enough times, it is possible to derive the K_{i} key. Later GSM SIMs have various mitigations built in, either by limiting the number of authentications performed in a power on session, or by the manufacturer choosing resistant K_{i} keys. However if it is known that a resistant key was used, it is possible to speed up the attack by eliminating weak K_{i} keys from the pool of possible keys.

== Effectiveness and legislation ==
Phone cloning is outlawed in the United States by the Wireless Telephone Protection Act of 1998, which prohibits "knowingly using, producing, trafficking in, having control or custody of, or possessing hardware or software knowing that it has been configured to insert or modify telecommunication identifying information associated with or contained in a telecommunications instrument so that such instrument may be used to obtain telecommunications service without authorization."

The effectiveness of phone cloning is limited. Every mobile phone contains a radio fingerprint in its transmission signal which remains unique to that mobile despite changes to the phone's ESN, IMEI, or MIN. Thus, cellular companies are often able to catch cloned phones when there are discrepancies between the fingerprint and the ESN, IMEI, or MIN.

== See also ==
- Dual SIM
- International Mobile Equipment Identity
- Subscriber identity module
