= International mobile subscriber identity =

ITU-T recommendation

International Mobile Subscriber Identity
- Abbreviation: IMSI
- Status: in force
- Year started: November 25, 1988; 37 years ago
- Latest version: (06/24); June 28, 2024
- Organization: ITU-T
- Website: itu.int/rec/T-REC-E.212

The international mobile subscriber identity (IMSI; /ˈɪmziː/ IM-zee) is a number that uniquely identifies every user of a cellular network. It is stored as a 64-bit field and is sent by the mobile device to the network. It is also used for acquiring other details of the mobile device in the home location register (HLR) or as locally copied in the visitor location register. To prevent eavesdroppers from identifying and tracking the subscriber on the radio interface, the IMSI is sent as rarely as possible and a randomly-generated TMSI is sent instead. Mobile phone identities and data are sometimes scooped up by equipment called an IMSI-catcher or Stingray phone tracker that mimics cellular networks, creating serious privacy and other human rights concerns.

The IMSI is used in any mobile network that interconnects with other networks. For GSM, UMTS and LTE networks, this number was provisioned in the SIM card and for cdmaOne and CDMA2000 networks, in the phone directly or in the R-UIM card (the CDMA equivalent of the SIM card). Both cards have been superseded by the UICC.

An IMSI is usually presented as a 15-digit number but can be shorter. For example, MTN South Africa's old IMSIs that are still in use in the market are 14 digits long. The first 3 digits represent the mobile country code (MCC), which is followed by the mobile network code (MNC), either 2-digit (European standard) or 3-digit (North American standard). The length of the MNC depends on the value of the MCC, and it is recommended that the length is uniform within a MCC area. The remaining digits are the mobile subscription identification number (MSIN) within the network's customer base, usually 9 to 10 digits long, depending on the length of the MNC.

The IMSI conforms to the ITU E.212 numbering standard.

IMSIs can sometimes be mistaken for the ICCID (E.118), which is the identifier for the physical SIM card itself (or now the virtual SIM card if it is an eSIM). The IMSI lives as part of the profile (or one of several profiles if the SIM and operator support multi-IMSI SIMs) on the SIM/ICCID.

== Examples of IMSI numeric presentational ==
IMSI:310170845466094
MCC	310	United States
MNC	170	AT&T
MSIN	845466094	

IMSI:470040123456789
MCC	470	Bangladesh
MNC	04	TeleTalk
MSIN	0123456789	

IMSI:502130123456789
MCC	502	Malaysia
MNC	13	Celcom
MSIN	0123456789	

IMSI:460001357924680
MCC	460	China
MNC	00	CMCC
MSIN	1357924680	

IMSI:520031234567890
MCC	520	Thailand
MNC	03	AIS
MSIN	1234567890	

IMSI:313460000000001
IMSI	313 460 000 000 001	
MCC	313	United States
MNC	460	Mobi
MSIN	000000001	
ICCID	891460 0000 0000 0012 (89 is the industry identifier for telecom and +1 is calling code)	

== IMSI analysis ==
IMSI analysis is the process of examining a subscriber's IMSI to identify the network the IMSI belongs to, and whether subscribers from that network may use a given network (if they are not local subscribers, this requires a roaming agreement).

If the subscriber is not from the provider's network, the IMSI must be converted to a Global Title, which can then be used for accessing the subscriber's data in the remote HLR. This is mainly important for international mobile roaming. Outside North America, the IMSI is converted to the Mobile Global Title (MGT) format, standard E.214, which is similar to an E.164 number. E.214 provides a method to convert the IMSI into a number that can be used for routing to international SS7 switches. E.214 can be interpreted as implying that there are two separate stages of conversion; first determine the MCC and convert to E.164 country calling code then determine MNC and convert to national network code for the carrier's network. But this process is not used in practice and the GSM numbering authority has clearly stated that a one-stage process is used .

In North America, the IMSI is directly converted to an E.212 number with no modification of its value. This can be routed directly on American SS7 networks.

After this conversion, SCCP is used to send the message to its final destination. For details, see Global Title Translation.

=== Example of outside World Area 1 ===
This example shows the actual practice which is not clearly described in the standards.

Translation rule:

- match numbers starting 28401 (Bulgaria mobile country code + MobilTel MNC)
- identify this as belonging to MobilTel-Bulgaria network
- remove first five digits (length of MCC+MNC)
- prepend 35988 (Bulgaria E.164 country code + a Bulgarian local prefix reaching MobilTel's network)
- mark the number as having E.214 numbering plan.
- route message on Global Title across SCCP network

Therefore, 284011234567890 becomes 359881234567890 under the E.214 numbering plan.

Translation rule:

- match numbers starting 310150 (America first MCC + Cingular MNC)
- remove first six digits (length of MCC+MNC)
- prepend 14054 (North America E.164 country code + Network Code for Cingular)
- mark the number as having E.214 numbering plan.
- route message on Global Title across SCCP network

Therefore, 310150123456789 becomes 14054123456789 under the E.214 numbering plan.

The result is an E.214 compliant Global Title, (Numbering Plan Indicator is set to 7 in the SCCP message). This number can now be sent to Global Title Analysis.

=== Example inside World Area 1 (North America) ===
Translation rule:

- match number starting 28401 (Bulgaria MCC + MobilTel MNC)
- identify this as belonging to MobilTel-Bulgaria network
- do not alter the digits of the number
- mark the number as having E.212 numbering plan.
- route message on Global Title across SCCP network

Therefore, 284011234567890 becomes 284011234567890 under the E.212 numbering plan.

This number has to be converted on the ANSI to ITU boundary. For more details please see Global Title Translation.

== Home Network Identity ==
The Home Network Identity (HNI) is the combination of the MCC and the MNC. This is the number which fully identifies a subscriber's home network. This combination is also known as the PLMN.

== See also ==
- IMEI
- MSISDN
- PLMN
- MEID
- Electronic Serial Number
- IMSI-catcher
- Telephone number
