= Anthony Soong =

Anthony C.K. Soong
- Education: University of Alberta (Ph.D.)
- Awards: IEEE Vehicular Society James Evans Avant Garde Award (2017); IEEE Fellowship (2014); IEEE Signal Processing Society Best Paper Award (2013); 3GPP2 Award of Merit (2005)
- Scientific career
- Fields: Electrical Engineering, Wireless Communications, Telecommunication
- Institutions: Huawei; Ericsson; Qualcomm
- Thesis: Reference Symbol Assisted Multistage Successive Interference Cancelling Receiver for Code Division Multiple Access Wireless Communication Systems (1997)
- Doctoral advisor: Witold A. Krzymień

Anthony C.K. Soong is a Canadian-American scientist who leads a research group at Futurewei Technologies. His research interests are in statistical signal processing, robust statistics, wireless communications, spread spectrum techniques, multicarrier signaling, multiple antenna techniques, software defined networking and physiological signal processing.

== Academic honors ==
Received from the Third Generation Partnership Project 2, the Award of Merit for his contribution to 3GPP2 and cdma2000 development in 2005.

The 2013 IEEE Signal Processing Society Best Paper Award for the paper "Multiuser MIMO in Distributed Antenna Systems with Out-of-Cell Interference".

Named Fellow of the Institute of Electrical and Electronics Engineers (IEEE) in 2014 for contributions to the standardization of cellular communication systems.

The 2017 IEEE Vehicular Society James Evans Avant Garde Award for contributions to the development and standardization of commercial cellular systems.

== Selected publications ==
- X. Dong, W. Lu and A. C. K. Soong, "Linear Interpolation in Pilot Symbol Assisted Channel Estimation for OFDM," in IEEE Transactions on Wireless Communications, vol. 6, no. 5, pp. 1910-1920, May 2007. doi: 10.1109/TWC.2007.360392
- R. W. Heath Jr, T. Wu, Y. H. Kwon and A. C. K. Soong, "Multiuser MIMO in Distributed Antenna Systems With Out-of-Cell Interference," in IEEE Transactions on Signal Processing, vol. 59, no. 10, pp. 4885-4899, Oct. 2011. doi: 10.1109/TSP.2011.2161985
- J. G. Andrews et al., "What Will 5G Be?," in IEEE Journal on Selected Areas in Communications, vol. 32, no. 6, pp. 1065-1082, June 2014.

doi: 10.1109/JSAC.2014.2328098
