= MTSO =

MTSO may refer to:

- Methodist Theological School in Ohio
- Mobile Telephone Switching Office
