= MSISDN =

Unique subscription identifier in a mobile network

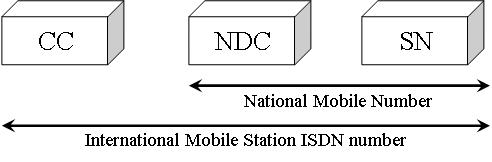
Mobile Subscriber Integrated Services Digital Network (MSISDN) number

MSISDN (/ˈɛm ɛs aɪ ɛs diː ɛn/) is a number uniquely identifying a subscription in a Global System for Mobile communications or a Universal Mobile Telecommunications System mobile network. It is the mapping of the telephone number to the subscriber identity module in a mobile or cellular phone. This abbreviation has several interpretations, the most common one being "Mobile Station International Subscriber Directory Number".

The MSISDN and international mobile subscriber identity (IMSI) are two important numbers used for identifying a mobile subscriber. The IMSI is stored in the SIM (the card inserted into the mobile phone), and uniquely identifies the mobile station, its home wireless network, and the home country of the home wireless network. The MSISDN is used for routing calls to the subscriber. The IMSI is often used as a key in the home location register ("subscriber database") and the MSISDN is the number normally dialed to connect a call to the mobile phone. A SIM has a unique IMSI that does not change, while the MSISDN can change in time, i.e. different MSISDNs can be associated with the SIM.

The MSISDN follows the numbering plan defined in the International Telecommunication Standard Sector recommendation E.164.

== Abbreviation ==
Depending on source or standardization body, the abbreviation MSISDN can be written out in several different ways. These are today the most widespread and common in use.

Organization	Meaning	Source
3GPP; ITU; OMA	Mobile Subscriber ISDN Number	Vocabulary for 3GPP Specifications (new); ITU-T Rec. Q.1741-4 (10/2005); Dictionary for OMA Specifications
CSPS; ITU; GSMA	Mobile Station International ISDN Number(s)	MSISDN Format and Details; ITU-T Rec. Q.1741-4 (10/2005); Mobile Terms & Acronyms
ITU	Mobile International ISDN Number	Vocabulary of Switching and Signalling Terms

== MSISDN format ==
The ITU-T recommendation E.164 limits the maximum length of an MSISDN to 15 digits. 1-3 digits are reserved for country code. Prefixes are not included (e.g., 00 prefixes an international MSISDN when dialing from Sweden). Minimum length of the MSISDN is not specified by ITU-T but is instead specified in the national numbering plans by the telecommunications regulator in each country.

In GSM and its variant DCS 1800, MSISDN is built up as

MSISDN = CC + NDC + SN
CC = Country Code
NDC = National Destination Code, identifies one or part of a PLMN
SN = Subscriber Number

In the GSM variant PCS 1900, MSISDN is built up as

MSISDN = CC + NPA + SN
CC = Country Code
NPA = Number Planning Area
SN = Subscriber Number

The country code identifies a country or geographical area, and may be between 1-3 digits. The ITU defines and maintains the list of assigned country codes.

=== _{3}N_{4}N_{5}N_{6}N_{7}N_{8} ===
CC/ISD Code	CCC (Example: 880)	Bangladesh
NDC/NPA Code	XX (Example: 15)	As allocated by the Government of Bangladesh: Teletalk: 015; Grameenphone: 017 & 013; Banglalink: 019 & 014; Robi: 018 & 016
SN	N_{1}N_{2}N_{3}N_{4}N_{5}N_{6}N_{7}N_{8} (example: 00121121)	

For further information on the MSISDN format, see the ITU-T specification E.164.

== See also ==
- E.164
- International Mobile Equipment Identity (IMEI)
- International Mobile Subscriber Identity (IMSI)
- SIM card
- Mobile phone
- GSM
- HLR
- E.214
- Mobile identification number
- Telephone number
