= China Communications Standards Association =

- Trade name: CCSA (2002-present)
- Company type: Standards organization
- Founded: December 18, 2002
- Founder: Chinese Ministry of Information Industry
- Headquarters: China

The China Communications Standards Association (CCSA) is a Chinese professional standards organization with the responsibility for developing communications technology standards. The organization was founded on 18 December 2002, by the Chinese Ministry of Information Industry.

The CCSA participates in standards development internationally. In 2004 it became an organizational partner of the 3rd Generation Partnership Project (3GPP); it is an organizational partner of 3GPP's rival standards body 3rd Generation Partnership Project 2 (3GPP2); in 2011 it signed a collaboration agreement with the IEEE; and it is recognized by and participates in the standardization activities of the International Telecommunication Union.
