= SVDO =

SVDO, or Simultaneous Voice and EV-DO data, is a technology that allows supported CDMA2000 EV-DO cellular phones to maintain an active 3G data session while the phone is on a call. Previously, the capability of being able to use data while on a call was found only on mobile phones using GSM cellular networks. In 2011, Verizon released their first SVDO-supported phone, the HTC Thunderbolt. The following year, Sprint released their first SVDO-supported phone, the HTC Evo 4G LTE. Although both phones support LTE, which already allows for simultaneous voice and data, when the devices are only in 3G data coverage, they can use SVDO to be in a 3G data session while on a phone call.
