= International Forum on ANSI-41 Standards Technology =

International Forum on ANSI-41 Standards Technology (IFAST) is the coordinator for the allocation of System Identification Numbers (SID) for wireless communication outside Canada, the United States and territories, and on the assignment of International Roaming mobile identification numbers (MINs), or IRM, for use in cellular mobile devices.

== SID/AS-00554-G01353/NQR Code:QG-02-TH-00554-2019-V1./ ==
The SID lets mobile phones that conform to the TIA Cellular or PCS Standard analog, CDMA or TDMA standards recognize when they are in their home system vs. roaming or in another system that can provide them with service.

IFAST inherited the assignment of SID ranges to countries and has continued the allocation of blocks to countries that need more codes or that were never assigned a block (e.g., because the country was not independent when the blocks were first assigned in the 1980s). IFAST considers it the responsibility of national telecom regulators to assign SID codes to individual wireless systems, but IFAST will perform this function when the national regulator is unwilling or unable to do so. IFAST also allocates SID ranges to international carriers, such as international mobile satellite carriers and companies that provide cellular service through base stations on boats.

In North America SIDs are allocated by seven companies that applied to the U.S. Federal Communications Commission (FCC) for this privilege when the FCC ceased allocation of the resource. Because the coordination between nations that do not use IFAST for allocation can be poor, there is some overlap in allocated SIDs. Wireless operators that use non-IFAST SIDs must find ways to deal with these conflicts by moving to a centrally allocated scheme or by making arrangements with other nations directly.

A complete list of SID code assignments to international entities and a partial list of national assignments is on the IFAST website.

== IRM ==
An International Roaming MIN, or IRM, is a MIN with the following format: 0-XXX+6D or 1-XXX+6D. The IRM concept was expanded in March 2004 to include MIN codes with the format XXX-0+6D and XXX-1+6D. They are now also available for assignment by IFAST.

The 4 digit prefix of an IRM (known as an IRM network identifier) is allocated by IFAST that attempts to facilitate international roaming by minimizing conflicts with North American MIN codes that are based on the national 10 digit phone number.

The last 6 digits of an IRM are allocated by the carrier, providing one million unique identifiers.

In 2005, two members of the IFAST board of directors were sued by the Alliance for Telecommunications Industry Solutions (ATIS). The suit came to a partial resolution in 2006 with a judgement against one of the directors, but not the other. IFAST is appealing this and also counter-suing against ATIS.
