= Number Assignment Module =

Number Assignment Module (NAM) is an electronic memory in a cellular phone that stores the telephone number, international mobile subscriber identity and an Electronic Serial Number. Phones with dual- or multi-NAM features offer users the option of registering the phone with a local number in more than one market.
