= Authentication and Key Agreement =

Authentication protocol used in 3G networks

Authentication and Key Agreement (AKA) is a security protocol used in 3G networks. AKA is also used for one-time password generation mechanism for digest access authentication. AKA is a challenge–response based mechanism that uses symmetric cryptography.

== AKA in CDMA ==
AKA – Authentication and Key Agreement a.k.a. 3G Authentication, Enhanced Subscriber Authorization (ESA).

The basis for the 3G authentication mechanism, defined as a successor to CAVE-based authentication, AKA provides procedures for mutual authentication of the Mobile Station (MS) and serving system. The successful execution of AKA results in the establishment of a security association (i.e., set of security data) between the MS and serving system that enables a set of security services to be provided.

Major advantages of AKA over CAVE-based authentication include:

- Larger authentication keys (128-bit )
- Stronger hash function (SHA-1)
- Support for mutual authentication
- Support for signaling message data integrity
- Support for signaling information encryption
- Support for user data encryption
- Protection from rogue MS when dealing with R-UIM

AKA is not yet implemented in CDMA2000 networks, although it is expected to be used for IMS. To ensure interoperability with current devices and partner networks, support for AKA in CDMA networks and handsets will likely be in addition to CAVE-based authentication.

Air interface support for AKA is included in all releases following CDMA2000 Rev C.

TIA-41 MAP support for AKA was defined in TIA-945 (3GPP2 X.S0006), which has been integrated into TIA-41 (3GPP2 X.S0004).

For information on AKA in roaming, see CDG Reference Document #138.

== AKA in UMTS ==
AKA a mechanism which performs authentication and session key distribution in Universal Mobile Telecommunications System (UMTS) networks. AKA is a challenge–response based mechanism that uses symmetric cryptography. AKA is typically run in a UMTS IP Multimedia Services Identity Module (ISIM), which is an application on a UICC (Universal Integrated Circuit Card). AKA is defined in RFC 3310.

== Security ==
As of 2018 an attack against all variants of AKA had been reported, including 5G.

== See also ==
- Evil twin (wireless networks)
- Cellphone surveillance
- Mobile phone tracking
- Stingray phone tracker
