= E.118 =

ITU-T Recommendation

- The international telecommunication charge card
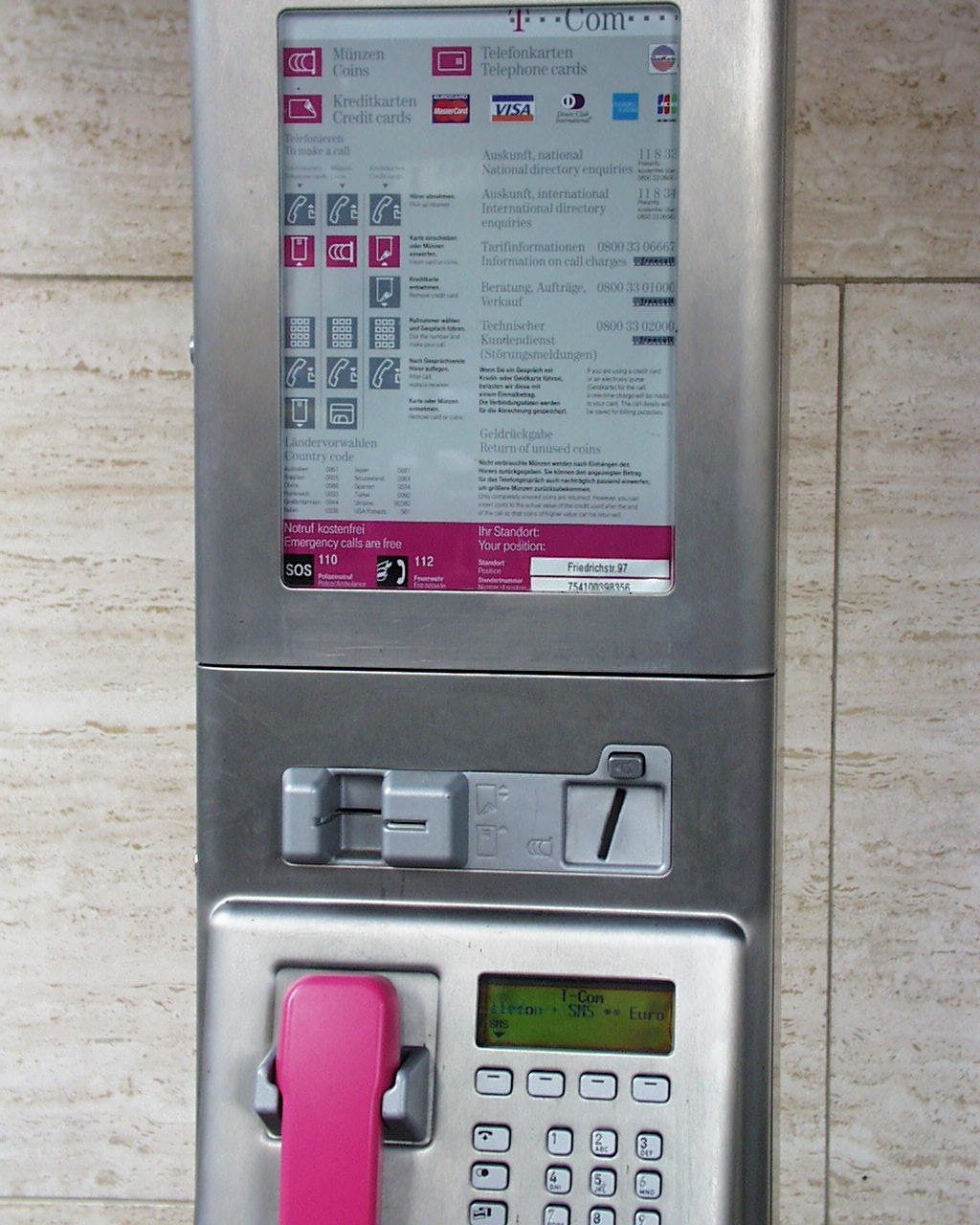
- Payphone for use of cardErasmo Byron
- Status: In force
- Year started: 1988
- Latest version: 05/06; May 2006
- Organization: ITU-T
- Committee: Study Group 1
- Website: https://www.itu.int/rec/T-REC-E.118

E.118 is an international standard that defines the international telecommunication charge card, for use in payphones. It also defines the Integrated Circuit Card Identifier (ICCID), which is used in Subscriber Identity Modules (SIMs, including SIM cards and eSIMs). The standard was first developed in 1988 by what became the Standardization Sector of the International Telecommunication Union (ITU-T) with several revisions having been published since then.

== History ==
The E.118 standard was first developed by the precursor to the ITU-T, International Telegraph and Telephone Consultative Committee (CCITT, in the French acronym) and it was adopted by its governing body the World Telecommunication Standardization Conference (WTSC), as its 1988 meeting. Since then it has been revised several times by Study Group 1, most recently in 1996.

== ICCID ==
The Integrated Circuit Card Identifier (ICCID) is a number to internationally identify callers, called a 'Primary Account Number', used i.a. in SIM cards including eSIM cards. Its layout is based on ISO/IEC 7812. The ICCID is made up of:

Issuer identification number (IIN)

Maximum of seven digits:

- Major industry identifier (MII), 2 fixed digits, 89 for telecommunication purposes.
- Country calling code, 1 to 3 digits, as defined by ITU-T recommendation E.164.
  - North American Numbering Plan countries use 1
  - Russia uses 7
  - Kazakhstan uses 997, even though it also uses the calling code +7
- Issuer identifier, 1–4 digits (together Country calling code and Issuer Identifier is no more than 5 digits).
  - Often identical to the Mobile Network Code (MNC).

Individual account identification

- Individual account identification number. Its length is variable, but every number under one IIN has the same length.
  - Often identical to the Mobile Subscription Identification Number (MSIN).

Check digit

- Single digit calculated from the other digits using the Luhn algorithm.

E.118 stipulates that the ITU-T updates a list of all current internationally assigned IIN codes in its Operational Bulletins which are published twice a month.
