= System identification number =

A system identification number (SID) is broadcast by one or more base stations to identify a cellular network in a certain area (usually contiguous). It is globally unique within AMPS, TDMA or CDMA networks (the first two systems are essentially obsolete). This number sometimes has conflicts (see IFAST).

== SID codes ==
These codes are broadcast as 15 bit values but transmitted as 16 bits by core network protocols. They can be listed within a wireless device to show preference for one network over another. The additional bit in core network protocols allows the range of codes above 32,767 to be used for internal purposes, such as segregating billing records within a large area identified by a single broadcast SID.

Telecommunications Industry Association committee TR-45.2 assigned ranges to every country extant in the 1980s and national regulators assigned individual numbers. IFAST took over in 1997. This number space is 90% utilized for country ranges. Many countries do not use all of their allocated codes, hence the majority of codes are unused.

SIDs are assigned to every carrier (e.g., Verizon, Sprint, Alltel) by national regulators or IFAST. SIDs are programmed into the phone when purchased. A phone will maintain a list of "preferred" systems identified by their SID code. The SID may also modify some signaling messages that are transmitted by mobiles (e.g. reducing the amount of information transmitted by "home" mobiles).

== How SIDs work ==
When the phone is turned on, it listens for a signal. If it receives a signal, it looks at the SID carried by the signal, and compares it with the one that is stored in the phone. Originally, in analog systems, the mobile would turn on the roaming indicator if the SID was not the single value stored in the phone.

With CDMA systems the Preferred Roaming List (PRL) is responsible for determining which areas a mobile can roam into. Base stations may also broadcast an MCC and MNC which can also be used by the PRL.
