= Radio fingerprinting =

Radio fingerprinting is a process that identifies a cellular phone or any other radio transmitter by the fingerprint that characterizes its signal transmission and is hard to imitate. An electronic fingerprint makes it possible to identify a wireless device by its radio transmission characteristics. Radio fingerprinting is commonly used by cellular operators to prevent cloning of cell phones — a cloned device will have the same numeric equipment identity but a different radio fingerprint.

Essentially, each transmitter (cell phones are just one type of radio transmitter) has a rise time signature when first keyed which is caused by the slight variations of component values during manufacture. Once the rise time signature is captured and assigned to a callsign, the use of a different transmitter using the same callsign is easily detected. Such systems are used in military signals intelligence and by radio regulatory agencies such as the U.S. Federal Communications Commission (FCC) for identifying illegal transmitters. They are also used for assessing usage for billing purposes in Subscriber Mobile Radio (SMR) systems.

This topic has garnered great attention in recent years as the radio fingerprinting technique offers a "physical layer" authentication solution, which can provide fundamentally superior performance than traditional higher-layer encryption solutions. The topic has been studied by various researchers across multiple disciplines, including Signal Processing, Antenna and Propagation and Computer Science.
