= Wireless Intelligent Network =

Wireless Intelligent Network (WIN) is a telecommunications architecture concept, which extends the principles of the Intelligent Network, traditionally used in wireline systems, to wireless telecommunications networks using the TIA-41 family of standards.

It was developed by the TR-45 Mobile and Personal Communications Systems Standards Committee of the TIA and enables the deployment of advanced services in wireless networks without requiring fundamental changes to existing network infrastructure.

== Overview ==
WIN applies Intelligent Network service-control concepts to cellular and personal communications service (PCS) systems. The architecture supports the introduction of supplementary and value-added services—such as caller identification, voice messaging, prepaid billing, and location-based services—through standardized interfaces and service logic separation.

By basing WIN on the TIA-41 protocol, service providers can implement enhanced services while maintaining compatibility with existing cellular infrastructure. The architecture separates service logic from switching functions, allowing more flexible service creation and deployment.

WIN was intended to provide several operational benefits, including:

- Interoperability among equipment from multiple vendors
- Consistent service availability across service areas
- More efficient network resource utilization
- Simplified service creation and deployment processes

The model mirrors earlier Intelligent Network implementations in wireline systems, adapting similar service-control mechanisms for wireless environments.

== TIA-41 standards ==
TIA-41 is a set of telecommunications standards that define signaling and intersystem procedures for cellular networks. It specifies the protocols required for mobility management, call delivery, authentication, and intersystem handoff between different cellular operators.

The standard was developed to support interoperability between cellular systems and to enable advanced services requiring standardized intersystem communication.
