= Packet data serving node =

The Packet Data Serving Node, or PDSN, is a component of a CDMA2000 mobile network. It acts as the connection point between the radio access and IP networks. This component is responsible for managing PPP sessions between the mobile provider's core IP network and the mobile station (mobile phone). It is similar in function to the GGSN (GPRS Gateway Support Node) that is found in GSM and UMTS networks.

Although PDSN is thought of being similar to GGSN in a conceptual sense, logically it's a combination of SGSN and GGSN in the CDMA world. It provides:

1. Mobility management functions (provided by SGSN in the GPRS/UMTS networks)
2. Packet routing functionality (provided by GGSN in the GPRS/UMTS networks)

== See also ==
- CDMA 2000
- Radio Network Controller
- Starent Networks is the leading provider of PDSN. www.starentnetworks.com

Template:Telecomm-infrastructure-stub
