= Network Access Identifier =

Unique identifier for individual users of a computer network

In computer networking, the Network Access Identifier (NAI) is a standard way of identifying users who request access to a network. The standard syntax is "user@realm". Sample NAIs include (from RFC 4282):

- bob
- joe@example.com
- fred@foo-9.example.com
- fred.smith@example.com
- fred_smith@example.com
- fred$@example.com
- fred=?#$&*+-/^smith@example.com
- eng.example.net!nancy@example.net
- eng%nancy@example.net
- @privatecorp.example.net
- \(user\)@example.net
- alice@xn--tmonesimerkki-bfbb.example.net

Network Access Identifiers were originally defined in RFC 2486, which was superseded by RFC 4282, which has been superseded by RFC 7542. The latter RFC is the current standard for the NAI. NAIs are commonly found as user identifiers in the RADIUS and Diameter network access protocols and the EAP authentication protocol.

The Network Access Identifier (NAI) is the user identity submitted by the client during network access authentication.

It is used mainly for two purposes:

1. The NAI is used when roaming, to identify the user.
2. To assist in the routing of the authentication request to the user's authentication server.

== See also ==
- Diameter
- EAP
- RADIUS
- Request for Comments
