= Mobile identification number =

Mobile subscription identification number

The mobile identification number (MIN) or mobile subscription identification number (MSIN) refers to the 10-digit unique number that a wireless carrier uses to identify a mobile phone, which is the last part of the international mobile subscriber identity (IMSI). The MIN is a number that uniquely identifies a mobile phone working under TIA standards for cellular and PCS technologies (e.g. EIA/TIA–553 analog, IS–136 TDMA, IS–95 or IS-2000 CDMA). MIN usage became prevalent for mobile number portability to switch providers. It can also be called the MSID (Mobile Station ID) or IMSI_S (Short IMSI).

== MIN derivation ==
The mobile identification number (MIN) is a number that is derived from the 10-digit directory telephone number assigned to a mobile station. The rules for deriving the MIN from the 10-digit telephone number are given in the IS-95 standard. MIN1 is the first or least significant 24 binary digits of the MIN. MIN2 is the second part of the MIN containing the 10 most significant binary digits. MIN1, and the ESN, along with other digital input, are used during the authentication process. The MIN is used to identify a mobile station.

In the case of analog cellular, the MIN is used to route the call. In most second generation systems, temporary numbers are assigned to the handset when routing calls as a security precaution.

== See also ==
- List of CDMA terminology
- IMSI
- MAC address
- Mobile Country Code (MCC)
- MNC
- ESN
- TMSI
- MSISDN
