= 3GPP =

Mobile telecommunications standards body

3rd Generation Partnership Project
- Abbreviation: 3GPP
- Formation: 1998; 28 years ago
- Type: Standards organization
- Region served: Worldwide
- Website: www.3gpp.org

The 3rd Generation Partnership Project (3GPP) is an umbrella term for a number of standards organizations which develop protocols for mobile telecommunications. Its best known work is the development and maintenance of:

- GSM and related 2G, 2.5G, and 2.75G standards, including GPRS and EDGE
- UMTS and related 3G standards, including HSPA and HSPA+
- LTE and related 4G standards, including LTE Advanced and LTE Advanced Pro
- 5G NR and related 5G standards, including 5G-Advanced
- An evolved IP Multimedia Subsystem (IMS) developed in an access independent manner

3GPP is a partnership project whose partners are its Organizational Partners (OPs), which are seven national or regional telecommunication standards organizations, and its Market Representation Partners (MRPs), which are a variety of other organizations. 3GPP organizes its work into three different streams: Radio Access Networks (TSG RAN), Services and Systems Aspects (TSG SA), and Core Network and Terminals (TSG CT).

The project was established in December 1998 with the goal of developing a specification for a 3G mobile phone system based on the 2G GSM system, within the scope of the International Telecommunication Union's International Mobile Telecommunications-2000, hence the name 3GPP. It should not be confused with now discontinued 3rd Generation Partnership Project 2 (3GPP2), which shadowed the 3GPP work to continue the development of a competing 3G system, CDMA2000.

The 3GPP administrative support team (known as the "Mobile Competence Centre") is located at the European Telecommunications Standards Institute headquarters in the Sophia Antipolis technology park in France.

== Organizational Partners ==
The seven 3GPP Organizational Partners are from Asia, Europe and North America. Their aim is to determine the general policy and strategy of 3GPP and perform the following tasks:

- The approval and maintenance of the 3GPP scope;
- The maintenance of the partnership project description;
- Take the decision to create or cease a Technical Specification Groups, and approve their scope and terms of reference;
- The approval of organizational partner funding requirements;
- The allocation of human and financial resources provided by the organizational partners to the Project Co-ordination Group;
- Act as a body of appeal on procedural matters referred to them.

Together with the Market Representation Partners (MRPs), they perform the following tasks:

- The maintenance of the partnership project agreement;
- The approval of applications for 3GPP partnership;
- Take the decision against a possible dissolution of 3GPP.

The Organizational Partners are:

Organizational partners
Organization	Country/region	Website
Association of Radio Industries and Businesses (ARIB)	Japan	ARIB
Alliance for Telecommunications Industry Solutions (ATIS)	USA	ATIS
China Communications Standards Association (CCSA)	China	CCSA
European Telecommunications Standards Institute (ETSI)	Europe	ETSI
Telecommunications Standards Development Society (TSDSI)	India	TSDSI
Telecommunications Technology Association (TTA)	South Korea	TTA
Telecommunication Technology Committee (TTC)	Japan	TTC

== Market Representation Partners ==
The 3GPP Organizational Partners can invite a Market Representation Partner to take part in 3GPP; a Market Representation Partner:

- Has the ability to offer market advice to 3GPP and to bring into 3GPP a consensus view of market requirements (e.g., services, features and functionality) falling within the 3GPP scope;
- Does not have the capability and authority to define, publish and set standards within the 3GPP scope, nationally or regionally;
- Has committed itself to all or part of the 3GPP scope;
- Has signed the partnership project agreement.

As of January 2025, the Market Representation Partners are:

Market representation partners
Organization	Website
5G-ACIA	http://www.5g-acia.org
5G Automotive Association	http://www.5gaa.org/
Deterministic Networking Alliance (5GDNA)	https://www.5gdna.org/
6G Smart Network and Services Industry Association (6G-IA)	https://6g-ia.eu/
5G Slicing Association (5GSA)	https://www.5g-sa.org/
5G Media Action Group (5G-MAG)	http://www.5g-mag.com/
Automotive Edge Computing Consortium (AECC)	https://aecc.org/
Broadband India Forum	http://www.broadbandindiaforum.com/
Cellular Operators Association of India (COAI)	https://www.coai.com
China Society of Automotive Engineers (CSAE)	http://www.sae-china.org/
CTIA	http://ctia.org/
Global Satellite Operators Association (GSOA)	https://gsoasatellite.com/
Global Certification Forum (GCF)	https://www.globalcertificationforum.org/
Global mobile Suppliers Association (GSA)	https://gsacom.com/
GSMA	https://www.gsma.com/
IPV6 Forum	https://www.ipv6forum.com/
International Organization for Marine Aids to Navigation (IALA)	https://www.iala.int/
Next Generation Mobile Networks (NGMN)	https://www.ngmn.org/
Public Safety Communication Europe (PSCE) Forum	http://www.psc-europe.eu/
Small Cell Forum	https://www.smallcellforum.org/
TCCA	https://tcca.info/
TD Industry Alliance	http://www.tdia.cn/
Wireless Broadband Alliance	http://www.wballiance.com/

== Standards ==
3GPP standards are structured as Releases. Discussion of 3GPP thus frequently refers to the functionality in one release or another.

Version	Released	Info
Phase 1	1992	GSM features
Phase 2	1995	GSM features, EFR codec,
Release 96	1997 Q1	GSM features, 14.4 kbit/s user data rate,
Release 97	1998 Q1	GSM features, GPRS
Release 98	1999 Q1	GSM features, AMR codec, EDGE, GPRS for PCS1900
Release 99	2000 Q1	Specified the first UMTS 3G networks, incorporating a CDMA air interface
Release 4	2001-06-21	Originally called the Release 2000 – added features including an all-IP core network
Release 5	2002-09-12	Introduced IMS and HSDPA
Release 6	2005-09-28	Integrated operation with Wireless LAN networks and adds HSUPA, MBMS, enhancements to IMS such as Push to Talk over Cellular (PoC), GAN
Release 7	2008-03-13	Focuses on decreasing latency, improvements to QoS and real-time applications such as VoIP. This specification also focus on HSPA+ (High Speed Packet Access Evolution), SIM high-speed protocol and contactless front-end interface (near-field communication enabling operators to deliver contactless services like Mobile Payments), EDGE Evolution.
Release 8	2009-03-12	First LTE release. All-IP network (SAE). New OFDMA, FDE and MIMO based radio interface, not backwards compatible with previous CDMA interfaces. Dual-cell HSDPA. UMTS HNB.
Release 9	2010-03-25	SAES Enhancements, WiMAX and LTE/UMTS Interoperability. Dual-cell HSDPA with MIMO, Dual-cell HSUPA. LTE HeNB. Evolved multimedia broadcast and multicast service (eMBMS).
Release 10	2011-06-08	LTE Advanced fulfilling IMT Advanced 4G requirements. Backwards compatible with release 8 (LTE). Multi-cell HSDPA (4 carriers).
Release 11	2013-03-06	Advanced IP interconnection of services. Service layer interconnection between national operators/carriers as well as third-party application providers. Heterogeneous networks (HetNet) improvements, coordinated multi-point operation (CoMP). In-device co-existence (IDC).
Release 12	2015-03-13	Enhanced small cells (higher order modulation, dual connectivity, cell discovery, self configuration), Carrier aggregation (2 uplink carriers, 3 downlink carriers, FDD/TDD carrier aggregation), MIMO (3D channel modeling, elevation beamforming, massive MIMO), New and enhanced services (cost and range of MTC, D2D communication, eMBMS enhancements)
Release 13	2016-03-11	LTE-Advanced Pro. LTE in unlicensed, LTE enhancements for machine-type communication. Elevation beamforming / full-dimension MIMO, indoor positioning.
Release 14	2017-06-09	Energy efficiency, location services (LCS), mission-critical data over LTE, mission-critical video over LTE, flexible mobile service steering (FMSS), multimedia broadcast supplement for public warning system (MBSP), enhancement for TV services over eMBMS, massive Internet of things, cell broadcast service (CBS)
Release 15	2019-06-07	First 5G NR ("New Radio") release. Support for 5G vehicle-to-x service, IP Multimedia Core Network Subsystem (IMS), future railway mobile communication system
Release 16	2020-07-03	The 5G system – phase 2: 5G enhancements, NR-based access to unlicensed spectrum (NR-U), satellite access
Release 17	2022-06-10	TSG RAN: several features that continue to be important for overall efficiency and performance of 5G NR: MIMO, spectrum sharing enhancements, UE power saving and coverage enhancements. RAN1 will also undertake the necessary study and specification work to enhance the physical layer to support frequency bands up to 71 GHz. TSG SA groups focused on further enhancements to the 5G system and enablers for new features and services: Enhanced support of: non-public networks, industrial Internet of things, low complexity NR devices, edge computing in 5GC, access traffic steering, switch and splitting support, network automation for 5G, network slicing, advanced V2X service, multiple USIM support, proximity-based services in 5GS, 5G multicast broadcast services, unmanned aerial systems (UAS), satellite access in 5G, 5GC location services, multimedia priority service...
Release 18	2024-06-21	5G-Advanced. Introducing further machine-learning based techniques at different levels of the wireless network. Edge computing, evolution of IMS multimedia telephony service, smart energy and infrastructure, vehicle-mounted relays, low power high accuracy positioning for industrial IoT scenarios, enhanced access to and support of network slicing, satellite backhaul in 5G...
Release 19	2025-12-12	5G-Advanced. AI/ML Air Interface, Ambient IoT, AI/ML for NG-RAN, SON/MDT, Channel modeling. Enhancements to MIMO, duplex, mobility, NTN, XR, and network energy saving.
Release 20	Target 2027 Q2	5G-Advanced and 6G studies.

Each release incorporates hundreds of individual technical specification and technical report documents, each of which may have been through many revisions. Current 3GPP standards incorporate the latest revision of the GSM standards.

The documents are made available without charge on 3GPP's web site. The technical specifications cover not only the radio part ("air interface") and core network, but also billing information and speech coding down to source code level. Cryptographic aspects (such as authentication, confidentiality) are also specified.

== Specification groups ==
The 3GPP specification work is done in Technical Specification Groups (TSGs) and Working Groups (WGs).

There are three Technical Specifications Groups, each of which consists of multiple WGs:

- RAN (Radio Access Network): RAN specifies the UTRAN and the E-UTRAN. It is composed of six working groups.

WG	Shorthand	Scope	Specifications
RAN WG1	RAN1	Radio Layer 1 (Physical layer)	List of specs
RAN WG2	RAN2	Radio Layer 2 and Radio Layer 3 Radio Resource Control	List of specs
RAN WG3	RAN3	UTRAN, E-UTRAN, NG-RAN architecture and related network interfaces	List of specs
RAN WG4	RAN4	Radio performance and protocol aspects	List of specs
RAN WG5	RAN5	Mobile terminal conformance testing	List of specs

- SA (Service and System Aspects): SA specifies the service requirements and the overall architecture of the 3GPP system. It is also responsible for the coordination of the project. SA is composed of six working groups.

WG	Shorthand	Scope	Specifications
SA WG1	SA1	Services	List of specs
SA WG2	SA2	Architecture	List of specs
SA WG3	SA3	Security	List of specs
SA WG4	SA4	Codec	List of specs
SA WG5	SA5	Management, Orchestration and Charging	List of specs
SA WG6	SA6	Application Enablement and Critical Communication Applications	List of specs

- CT (Core Network and Terminals): CT specifies the core network and terminal parts of 3GPP. It includes the core network – terminal layer 3 protocols. It is composed of five working groups.

WG	Shorthand	Scope	Specifications
CT WG1	CT1	User Equipment – Core Network protocols	List of specs
CT WG2	CT2	closed	
CT WG3	CT3	Interworking with external networks	List of specs
CT WG4	CT4	Core Network Protocols	List of specs
CT WG5 (closed)	CT5	Open Services Access (OSA)	Succeeded by the Open Mobile Alliance
CT WG6	CT6	Smart Card Application Aspects	List of specs

- GERAN (GSM/EDGE Radio Access Network):

The closure of GERAN was announced in January 2016. The specification work on legacy GSM/EDGE system was transferred to RAN WG, RAN6. RAN6 was closed in July 2020 (https://www.3gpp.org/news-events/2128-r6_geran).

The 3GPP structure also includes a Project Coordination Group, which is the highest decision-making body. Its missions include the management of overall timeframe and work progress.

== Standardization process ==
3GPP standardization work is contribution-driven. Companies ("individual members") participate through their membership to a 3GPP organizational partner. As of December 2020, 3GPP is composed of 719 individual members.

Specification work is done at WG and at TSG level:

- the 3GPP WGs hold several meetings a year. They prepare and discuss change requests against 3GPP specifications. A change request accepted at WG level is called "agreed".
- the 3GPP TSGs hold plenary meetings quarterly. The TSGs can "approve" the change requests that were agreed at WG level. Some specifications are under the direct responsibility of TSGs and therefore, change requests can also be handled at TSG level. The approved change requests are subsequently incorporated in 3GPP specifications.

3GPP follows a three-stage methodology as defined in ITU-T Recommendation I.130:

- stage 1 specifications define the service requirements from the user point of view.
- stage 2 specifications define an architecture to support the service requirements.
- stage 3 specifications define an implementation of the architecture by specifying protocols in details.

Test specifications are sometimes defined as stage 4, as they follow stage 3.

Specifications are grouped into releases. A release consists of a set of internally consistent set of features and specifications.

Timeframes are defined for each release by specifying freezing dates. Once a release is frozen, only essential corrections are allowed (i.e. addition and modifications of functions are forbidden). Freezing dates are defined for each stage.

The 3GPP specifications are transposed into deliverables by the organizational partners.

== See also ==
- List of mobile phone generations
- Universal Mobile Telecommunications System (UMTS)
- LTE
- 3G
- IP Multimedia Subsystem
- 3GP
- 3GPP2 – The 3GPP's counterpart in the CDMA2000 sphere.
- GSM services
- LoRaWAN
- Telecoms & Internet converged Services & Protocols for Advanced Networks (TISPAN)
- Open Mobile Alliance
- Service data adaptation protocol
- Service layer
- European Telecommunications Standards Institute
