= Preferred Roaming List =

Used in CDMA phones

The Preferred Roaming List (PRL) is a database residing in a wireless (primarily CDMA) device, such as a cellphone, that contains information used during the system selection and acquisition process. In the case of R-UIM-based CDMA devices, the PRL resides on the R-UIM. The PRL indicates which bands, sub bands, and service provider identifiers will be scanned and in what priority order. Without a PRL, the device may not be able to roam, i.e. obtain service outside of the home area. There may be cases where missing or corrupt PRLs can lead to a customer not having service at all.

On many networks, regularly updating the PRL is advised if the subscriber uses the device outside the home area frequently, particularly if they do so in multiple different areas. This allows the phone to choose the best roaming carriers, particularly "roaming partners" with whom the home carrier has a cost-saving roaming agreement, rather than using non-affiliated carriers. PRL files can also be used to identify home networks along with roaming partners, thus making the PRL an actual list that determines the total coverage of the subscriber, both home and roaming coverage.

The PRL is built by an operator and is normally not accessible to the user. Many operators provide the ability for the user to download the latest PRL to their device by dialing an Over-the-air (OTA) feature code. In the United States, for Verizon / MetroPCS / US Cellular, this feature code is *228 (*ACT). For Sprint, it is ##873283# (it is also possible to use code ##72786# on Android or ##25327# on iOS to completely clear out the service programming and redo OTA activation, which includes updating the PRL). In Canada, for Telus Mobility, the PRL update feature code is *22803 (*ACT03).

== PRL structure ==
The PRL consists of two tables (along with some header and overhead information):

- Acquisition Table – An indexed list of frequencies on which the device may search for particular systems. The idea behind the acquisition table is to optimize the acquisition time by identifying only the frequencies that should be searched, rather than searching the entire frequency spectrum. The information contained in each acquisition table entry includes an index, the network type, and associated channel blocks.

- System Table – A prioritized list of systems that the device is permitted to access (Preferred Systems) and those that it is explicitly forbidden to access (Negative Systems). Note that it is also possible to indicate forbidden systems using a separate SID/NID Lockout List in the handset; however, this is not a recommended approach as it creates control over system selection outside of the PRL.

Each system table entry belongs to a geographic area known as a GEO. These GEOs are listed in priority order. Each IS-95/1xRTT system is identified by either SID/NID or, in the case of enhanced PRL, SID/NID or MCC/MNC. To support 1xEV-DO systems, the PRL must be IS-683-C or later. Each 1xEV-DO system is identified by a Subnet ID. For hybrid mode operation (i.e. IS-95/1xRTT and 1xEV-DO), association tags are used link an IS-95/1xRTT system with one or more 1xEV-DO systems. Hybrid systems always attempt to select an IS-95/1xRTT system first, then use the association tag to attempt to select an associated 1xEV-DO system.
Each entry also provides an acquisition table index where the frequencies associated with that system are identified and a roaming indicator that dictates what type of indication should be displayed to the user when they are receiving service from that system.

== PRL modes of operation ==
The PRL may operate in one of two modes, dictated by a Preferred Only indicator:

- Permissive Mode (a.k.a. Open PRL, Not Preferred Mode) – The device will attempt to acquire preferred systems; however, if no preferred systems can be located, then the device may select systems that are not listed in the PRL system table. It still will not select negative systems; but, if no preferred systems can be found and an unknown system is available, then it will select the unknown system. While this mode of operation is easier to maintain, because new partners can be chosen even if they are not explicitly listed in the PRL, it carries with it the danger of allowing the mobile device to become camped onto a system that will not provide it with service.
- Restrictive Mode (a.k.a. Closed PRL, Preferred Only Mode) – The device will only acquire systems identified as preferred in the PRL system table. While this mode of operation gives operators the most control over the system selection process, it requires that PRLs be kept up-to-date to ensure that newly added roaming partners can be selected. Note that even if a PRL is restrictive according to the preferred only indicator, the use of wildcard SID/NID or MCC/MNC values as preferred systems would essentially make the PRL permissive, because wildcards match any system that is located.
