= Mobile Telephone Switching Office =

The Mobile Telephone Switching Office (MTSO) is the mobile equivalent of a PSTN Central Office. The MTSO contains the switching equipment or Mobile Switching Center (MSC) for routing mobile phone calls. It also contains the equipment for controlling the cell sites that are connected to the MSC.

The systems in the MTSO are the heart of a cellular system. It is responsible for interconnecting calls with the local and long distance landline telephone companies, compiling billing information (with the help of its CBM/SDM), etc. It also provides resources needed to efficiently serve a mobile subscriber such as registration, authentication, location updating and call routing. Its subordinate BSC/RNC are responsible for assigning frequencies to each call, reassigning frequencies for handoffs, controlling handoffs so a mobile phone leaving one cell (formally known as BTS's) coverage area, can be switched automatically to a channel in the next cell.

All cellular systems have at least one MTSO which will contain at least one MSC. The MSC is responsible for switching calls to mobile units as well as to the local telephone system, recording billing data and processing data from the cell site controllers.

The MSC is connected to a close telephone exchange by a trunk group. This provides an interface to the (Public Switched Telephone Network) (PSTN). It also provides connectivity to the PSTN. The region to be served by a Cellular Geographic Serving Area(CGSA) is split into geographic cells. These cells are ideally hexagonal in shape and they are initially laid out with their centers about 4 to 8 miles apart from each other. Other MTSO equipment, the cell site controllers provide control functions for a group of cell sites and actions of mobile phones through command and control data channels. To achieve this, there has to be a method of connectivity between the MTSO and the cell site. This may be by DS1, DS3, OCn or Ethernet circuits.

== Subscriber Registration ==
The MSC also plays a major role in call routing. When a mobile phone is turned on, it listens for the network operator's SID (System Identification Code) on the control channel. If it cannot find any control channels to listen to then it assumes it is outside the range and displays a message indicating no service. If it finds a control channel to listen to, receives the SID and then compares it to the SID programmed into the phone. If both SIDs match then it knows that it is communicating with a cell in its home system.

The phone also transmits a registration request along with the SID. If the subscriber has previously registered to a particular MSC then the MSC will have a record in its VLR and will therefore know the subscriber last registered location. If the subscriber is unknown to the MSC's VLR, it will query the HLR to obtain the subscriber's profile and save it for a set length of time in its VLR. Anytime a MSC successfully registers a subscriber the HLR record is also updated. This will help when a call is received outside of the MSC's coverage area or for an incoming PSTN call.

A subscriber's VLR profile has a LAC(Location Area Code - Area server by cluster of BTS/cell sites) CID (Cell ID) as well as a list of allowed and disallowed services/features and other information.

With the subscriber's VLR Profile the MSC can determine the last known LAC/CID for this subscriber and knows which BTS to use when it needs to ring/page that phone for an incoming call. When the MSC gets the call, it checks its database for the location of the phone. Then it picks a frequency pair the phone will use in that cell to take the call. The MSC communicates with the phone over the control channel to tell it which frequencies to use, and once the phone and the tower switch on those frequencies, the call is connected.

== Handovers ==
As a mobile unit engaged in a call moves away from a cell site or formally known as Base transceiver station and its signal weakens, the BSC(GSM) or RNC(3G UMTS) will automatically instruct it to tune to a different frequency, one assigned to the newly entered BTS. This process is called handoff. The BSC/RNC determines when handoff should take place by analyzing measurements of radio signal strength made by the present controlling cell site and by its neighbors. The returning instructions for handoff sent during a call must use the voice channel. The data regarding the new channel are sent rapidly (in about 50 milliseconds), and the entire returning process takes only about 300 milliseconds. After handoff, if the SID on the control channel does not match the SID programmed into the phone, then the phone assumes that it is roaming.

The MSC also performs handovers/handoffs, which occur when a call needs to be transferred to either a different BSC/RNC it serves, or to a completely new MSC. A MSC can serve many BSCs/RNCs, which in turn serves many BTSs. As a result, a MSC can serve a large area, typically hundreds of miles. Highly populated areas require more BTSs and BSCs/RNCs, which will in turn reduce the geographic coverage of a DMSC. The above in a MSC is what's considered as its mobility management. The BTS and BSC/RNC are the RAN/UTRAN (Radio Access Network & UMTS Radio Access Network) subset in the mobile network. The remaining functions of a MSC are identical to a PSTN switch.

== See also ==
- Cellular Network
- Roaming
- Handoff
- Advanced Mobile Phone System
