= IMT-2000 =

Requirements issued by the ITU-R for 3G mobile services

IMT-2000 (International Mobile Telecommunications-2000) is the global standard for third generation (3G) wireless communications as defined by the International Telecommunication Union.

In 1999 ITU approved five radio interfaces for IMT-2000 as a part of the ITU-R M.1457 Recommendation. The five standards are:

- IMT-2000 CDMA Direct Spread
  - also known as W-CDMA, used in UMTS, the successor to GSM
- IMT-2000 CDMA Multi-Carrier
  - also known as CDMA2000, the successor to 2G CDMA (IS-95)
- IMT-2000 CDMA TDD
  - also known as TD-SCDMA
- IMT-2000 TDMA Single Carrier
  - also known as EDGE, an intermediate 2.5G technology
- IMT-2000 FDMA/TDMA
  - also known as DECT

To meet the IMT-2000 standards, a system must provide peak data rates of at 384 kbit/s for mobile stations and 2 Mbit/s for fixed stations.
