= 3rd Generation Partnership Project 2 =

Mobile phone specification system project

- Abbreviation: 3GPP2
- Type: Standards organization

The 3rd Generation Partnership Project 2 (3GPP2) was a collaboration between telecommunications associations to make a globally applicable third generation (3G) mobile phone system specification within the scope of the ITU's IMT-2000 project. In practice, 3GPP2 was the standardization group for CDMA2000, the set of 3G standards based on the earlier cdmaOne 2G CDMA technology.

The participating associations were ARIB/TTC (Japan), China Communications Standards Association, Telecommunications Industry Association (North America) and Telecommunications Technology Association (South Korea).

The agreement was established in December 1998.

Ultra Mobile Broadband (UMB) was a 3GPP2 project to develop a fourth-generation successor to CDMA2000. In November 2008, Qualcomm, UMB's lead sponsor, announced it was ending development of the technology, favoring LTE instead.

3GPP2 should not be confused with 3GPP; 3GPP is the standard body behind the Universal Mobile Telecommunications System (UMTS) that is the 3G upgrade to GSM networks, while 3GPP2 was the standard body behind the competing 3G standard CDMA2000 that is the 3G upgrade to cdmaOne networks that was used mostly in the United States (and to some extent also in Japan, China, Canada, South Korea and India).

GSM/UMTS were the most widespread 2G/3G wireless standards worldwide. Most countries used only the GSM family. A few countries, including China, the United States, Canada, Ukraine, Trinidad and Tobago, India, South Korea and Japan, used both standards.

3GPP2 had its last activity in 2013, and the group has been dormant ever since. The 3GPP2 website was taken offline in 2023, primarily due to CDMA carriers deploying 3GPP's LTE instead of UMB the decade prior and later shutting down CDMA networks making the 3GPP2 redundant and unneeded. However, while the website briefly came back online in 2024, it since went back offline.
