= CDMA2000 =

Family of 3G mobile technology standards

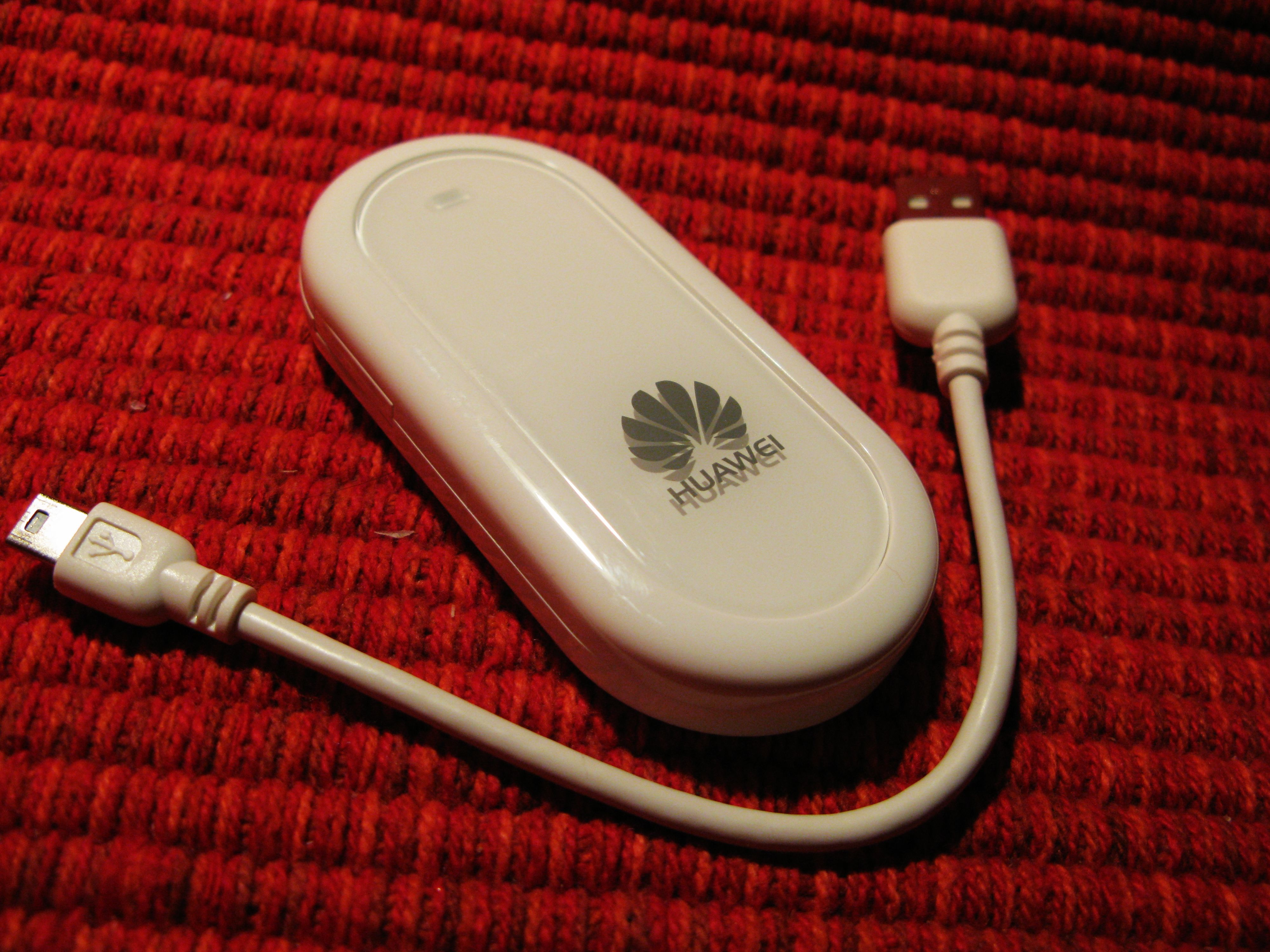
Huawei CDMA2000 EVDO USB wireless modem (2009)

CDMA2000 (also known as C2K or IMT Multi‑Carrier (IMT‑MC)) is a family of 3G mobile technology standards for sending voice, data, and signaling data between mobile phones and cell sites. It is developed by 3GPP2 as a backwards-compatible successor to second-generation cdmaOne (IS-95) set of standards and used especially in North America and South Korea.

CDMA2000 compares to UMTS, a competing set of 3G standards, which is developed by 3GPP and used in Europe, Japan, China, and Singapore.

The name CDMA2000 denotes a family of standards that represent the successive, evolutionary stages of the underlying technology. These are:

- Voice: CDMA2000 1xRTT, 1X Advanced
- Data: CDMA2000 1xEV-DO (Evolution-Data Optimized): Release 0, Revision A, Revision B, Ultra Mobile Broadband (UMB)

All are approved radio interfaces for the ITU's IMT-2000. In the United States, CDMA2000 is a registered trademark of the Telecommunications Industry Association (TIA-USA).

As of 2026, almost all public CDMA2000 networks have been shut down, usually to be replaced by LTE and/or 5G NR networks.

== 1X ==
CDMA2000 1X (IS-2000), also known as 1x and 1xRTT, is the core CDMA2000 wireless air interface standard. The designation "1x", meaning 1 times radio transmission technology, indicates the same radio frequency (RF) bandwidth as IS-95: a duplex pair of 1.25 MHz radio channels. 1xRTT almost doubles the capacity of IS-95 by adding 64 more traffic channels to the forward link, orthogonal to (in quadrature with) the original set of 64. The 1X standard supports packet data speeds of up to 153 kbit/s with real world data transmission averaging 80–100 kbit/s in most commercial applications. IMT-2000 also made changes to the data link layer for greater use of data services, including medium and link access control protocols and quality of service (QoS). The IS-95 data link layer only provided best-effort delivery for data and circuit switched channel for voice (i.e., a voice frame once every 20 ms).

== 1xEV-DO ==
BlackBerry smartphone displaying '1XEV' as the service status in the upper right corner (2011)

CDMA2000 1xEV-DO (Evolution-Data Optimized), often abbreviated as EV-DO or EV, is a telecommunications standard for the Wireless transmission of data through radio signals, typically for broadband Internet access. It uses multiplexing techniques including code-division multiple access (CDMA) as well as time-division multiple access to maximize both individual user's throughput and the overall system throughput. It is standardized (IS-856) by 3rd Generation Partnership Project 2 (3GPP2) as part of the CDMA2000 family of standards and has been adopted by many mobile phone service providers around the world – particularly those previously employing CDMA networks.

== 1X Advanced ==
1X Advanced (Rev.E) is the evolution of CDMA2000 1X. It provides up to four times the capacity and 70% more coverage compared to 1X.

== Networks ==
The CDMA Development Group states that, as of April 2014, there are 314 operators in 118 countries offering CDMA2000 1X and/or 1xEV-DO service.

As of 2025, only very few active networks remain, with most of them being private networks maintained for machine to machine communication for specific critical infrastructure.

== Access authentication in CDMA networks ==
Access authentication in CDMA networks for telecommunications and computing provide network access for a mobile device. Specific methods such as CAVE-based Authentication (IS-95/1xRTT), and A12 Authentication (1xEV-DO) are possible. The serving network provides the mobile device access authentication mechanism. The exact method employed depends upon the type of service being used:

- CAVE-based Authentication – Used for access authentication in CDMA/1xRTT
- AKA – 3G successor to CAVE-based authentication
- A12 Authentication – Used for access authentication in 1xEV-DO

1xEV-DO Hybrid MS/AT devices may employ both CAVE-based and A12 authentication since these devices connect to both the 1xRTT and 1xEV-DO networks.

== History ==
CDMA2000 technology was developed by Qualcomm in the late 1990s as an enhancement to the cdmaOne standard.

The intended 4G successor to CDMA2000 was UMB (Ultra Mobile Broadband); however, in November 2008, Qualcomm announced it was ending development of the technology, favoring LTE instead.

In the USA, the last CDMA2000 network was shut down in 2024.

== Patent licensing ==
In 2007, Qualcomm provided a global patent license for CDMA2000 to the Chinese company Teleepoch.

== See also ==
- Channel access method
- List of authentication protocols
- List of CDMA2000 networks
- Mobile broadband
