= List of applications of near-field communication =

As of April 2011, several hundred trials of near-field communication have been conducted. Some firms have moved to full-scale service deployments, spanning either a single country or multiple countries.

Multi-country deployments include Orange's roll-out of NFC technology to banks, retailers, transport, and service providers in multiple European countries, and Airtel Africa and Oberthur Technologies deploying to 15 countries throughout Africa.

== Africa ==
=== Kenya ===
- Public transport: The Nairobi-based Citi Hoppa bus company has partnered with Beba to offer NFC enabled proximity cards for fare payments. Citi Hoppa staff use the Huawei Sonic NFC enabled phone to process these transactions.

=== Libya ===
- Mobile payments: LPTIC, Al Madar, Libyana

=== South Africa ===
- Public transport: Aconite, Proxema
- Mobile payments: Absa

== Europe ==
=== Austria ===
- Public transport: Mobilkom Austria (A1), ÖBB, Vienna Lines

=== Belgium ===
- Mobile payments: Belgacom, Mobistar, Base
- Paper vouchers study: IBBT, Clear2Pay/Integri, Keyware, Accor Services

=== Croatia ===
- Public transport (ZET, Zagreb)
- Payment (Erste Bank Croatia, MasterCard PayPass system)

=== Czech Republic ===
- Mobile payments: Telefónica O2 Czech Republic, Komerční banka, Citibank Europe, Globus, Visa Europe, Baumax, Cinema City, Ikea
- NFC Access Control: IMA ltd. developed in 2009 a standalone access control system PATRON-PRO programmed by NFC enabled phone.

=== Denmark ===
- Mobile payment vending machines: NFC & SMS payment, Coca-Cola and Microsoft, NFC Danmark.

=== France ===
- Home healthcare: ADMR, Extelia, Inside Contactless, Abrapa
- Field service: Orange France
- Event ticketing: Stade de France, Orange
- Museum services: Centre Pompidou
- National NFC infrastructure: Paris, Bordeaux, Caen, Lille, Marseille, Rennes, Strasbourg, Toulouse, Nice, French Government
- Nice, Ville NFC: Gemalto, Oberthur Technologies, multi-bank (BNP Paribas, Crédit Agricole, Société Générale) with MasterCard, Visa Europe, Veolia Transport
- Loyalty programs: La Croissanterie, Rica Lewis, Game in Nice
- Public transport: Veolia Transport in Nice

=== Germany ===
- Public transport (selected regions): VRR, RMV and Deutsche Bahn (combines the companies' previous HandyTicket and Touch & Travel programs)
- Mobile workforce management: ENAiKOON
- Mobile payment: Deutsche Telekom, Vodafone Germany, Telefónica 02 Germany
- Health insurance card: All public health insurance providers
- NFC-based Card Game

=== Hungary ===
- Event ticketing: Sziget Festival, Vodafone Hungary

=== Ireland ===
- Loyalty program: AIB Merchant Services (Allied Irish Bank, First Data), Zapa Technology

=== Italy ===
- Mobile payment: Telecom Italia.
- Public transport: ATM (Milan), CAP autolinee (Prato).
- Contactless payment cards: Intesa Sanpaolo, MasterCard, Gemalto.
- Anti-counterfeiting: Tag Over.

=== Lithuania ===
- Mobile payments: Mokipay

=== The Netherlands ===
- Public transport: OV-chipkaart
- Commercial services: T-Mobile, Vodafone, KPN, Rabobank, ABN Amro, ING.
- Employee payments: Rabobank, Multicard

=== Norway ===
- Airline Smart Pass: SAS Scandinavian Airlines introduces an NFC-based Smart Pass for frequent flyers, and the aviation industry's adoption of NFC is now truly underway.
- Payments with MobilePay by Danske Bank.
- Public transport tickets in most cities.

=== Poland ===
- Mobile payments: Polkomtel, Bank Zachodni WBK; PTC, Inteligo; Orange, Bank Zachodni WBK

=== Romania ===
- Public transport: Metrorex, RATT and RATB
- Guard patrol monitoring: nLogix

=== Russia ===
- Public transport: Yekaterinburg Metro and MegaFon
- Public transport: Moscow Metro and Mobile TeleSystems

=== Slovenia ===
- Mobile payments, marketing: Banka Koper, Cassis International, Inside Contactless, System Orga, Mobitel

=== Spain ===
- Mobile shopping: Telefónica, Visa, La Caixa (Sitges)
- Public transport: Bankinter, Ericsson, Empresa Municipal de Transportes (Madrid); Vodafone, Entidad Publica del Transporte (Murcia)
- Event product payments: Mobile World Congress, GSMA, Telefónica, Visa, Samsung, Giesecke & Devrient, Ingenico, ITN International, La Caixa
- Employee payment, building access: Telefónica Espana, La Caixa, BBVA, Bankinter, Visa, Samsung, Oberthur, Autogrill, Giesecke & Devrient

=== Sweden ===
- Airline Smart Pass: SAS Scandinavian Airlines introduces an NFC-based Smart Pass for frequent flyers, and the aviation industry's adoption of NFC is now truly underway.
- Hotel keys: Choice Hotels Scandinavia, Assa Abloy, TeliaSonera, VingCard Elsafe, Venyon (Stockholm)
- Transportation: Pay as you go in Southern Sweden with NFC enabled "Jojo cards"

=== Switzerland ===
- Phone service kiosk: Sicap, Swisscom
- Mobile wallet

=== Turkey ===
- Yapı ve Kredi Bankası and Turkcell, NFC is used on mobile payment all over Turkey with Yapı ve Kredi Bankası credit cards via mobile phones using Turkcell sim cards
- Mobile payments: Yapi Kredi, Turkcell, Wireless Dynamics; Avea, Garanti Bank, Gemalto
- Device testing: Visa Europe, Akbank

=== United Kingdom ===
- Contactless payment: Transport for London
- Transport study: Department for Transport, Consult Hyperion
- Mobile payments: Waspit, Yates; Barclaycard and Everything Everywhere (Orange, T-Mobile)

== North America ==
=== Canada ===
- Contactless Payment Cards: MasterCard Paypass, Visa PayWave
- Mobile wallet: Tim Hortons TimmyME BlackBerry 10 Application; Zoompass, offered by Bell Mobility, Rogers and Telus (Enstream)
- Public Transit: Presto card, Compass Card (TransLink)
- TAPmeTAGS Opens In Canada: Offered by Synaptic Vision Inc.

=== United States ===
- Device trial: Bank of America, Device Fidelity; US Bank, Device Fidelity, FIS, Montise
- Mobile payments: AT&T, Verizon, T-Mobile; Adirondack Trust; Community State Bank; Bankers Bank of the West; PayPal; Bank of America; US Bank; Wells Fargo; Blackboard; Google Wallet; Apple pay.
- Community Marketing and Business Rating: Google Places: Portland, OR; Austin, TX; Las Vegas, NV; Madison, WI; Charlotte, NC.
- Public transit: Visa, New York City Transit, NJ Transit, The Port Authority of New York and New Jersey, Chicago Transit Authority, LA Metro (Los Angeles, CA)

== Asia ==
=== China ===
- Mobile payments: China Unicom, Bank of Communications, China UnionPay
- Mobile transport ticketing: China Unicom

=== Hong Kong (China) ===
- Contactless Payment/Public Transit: Octopus card

=== India ===
- Mobile banking: A Little World; Citibank India
- Tata Docomo, MegaSoft XIUS (Hyderabad)
- PayMate have partnered Nokia to deploy NFC payment solution for mass market in India through Nokia NFC enabled handsets.
- Tagstand partnered with Paymate to deploy an NFC marketing campaign for Nokia and the movie Ra-One in priority partner stores across India.
- jusTap! has tied up with CineMAX to implement NFC campaign using nfc enabled smart posters at the movie theaters in Mumbai
- jusTap! partners with Game4u to launch the first of its kind retail in‐store experience using NFC across India

=== Japan ===
- Consumer services: Softbank Mobile, Credit Saison, Orient Corporation
- Consumer services: KDDI, Toyota, Orient Corporation, Credit Saison, Aiwa Card Services, MasterCard, Nomura Research Institute, All Nippon Airways, Japan Airlines, Toho Cinemas, Dai Nippon Printing, NTT Data, T-Engine, IBM, Japan Remote Control Co., Hitachi, Gemalto
- Consumer services: NTT Docomo and KT
- Social networking: Mixi

=== Malaysia ===
- Clixster
- Maxis FastTap
- Touch n Go

=== Philippines ===
- Consumer and commercial services: Jollibee Happyplus Card
- Xcite Republic: J Centre Mall

=== South Korea ===
- Consumer and commercial services: KT solo and with NTT Docomo
- Cross-border services (with Japan): SK Telecom, KDDI, Softbank
- Mobile payment: SK Telecom, Hana SK Card
- Guided shopping: SK Telecom

=== Singapore ===
- Mobile payments:MasterCard, DBS Bank, StarHub, EZ-Link, Gemalto

=== Sri Lanka ===
- Public transport: Dialog Axiata
- Public transport: Mobitel
- Contactless Payment Cards: Hatton National Bank & AirtelDialog Axiata
- Contactless Payment Cards: Sampath Bank

=== Thailand ===
- Mobile payments: Kasikorn Bank, AIS, Gemalto, AIS mPay Rabbit

== Australasia ==
=== Australia ===
- Mobile payments: m Payments Pty Ltd
- Contactless Micro Payment Cards: m Payments Pty Ltd
- Contactless Payment and Loyalty: m Payments Pty Ltd
- Mobile payments: Visa and ANZ Banking Group
- Mobile payments: PayPass and Facebook and Commonwealth Bank Australia by Commbank Kaching

=== New Zealand ===
- Full real time Multi-Currency NFC system linked to New Zealand, Tonga, Australia, Fiji and Samoa, including BPay: (KlickEx, Digicel and Verifone)

== Middle East ==
=== Israel ===
- Rav Kav - An electronic ticket used in all public transportation companies over Israel. was first introduced in August 2007 by the Ministry of Transportation of the state of Israel, first offered on August 28, 2007 by Kavim bus company, and since January 2009 used as nationwide payment method in all public transportation companies, includes: all bus companies, Israel Railways and the Jerusalem Light Rail.
- The First NFC news&shop website

== South America ==
=== Brazil ===
- Mobile payments: Oi Paggo, Paggo from Oi, Germalto's Upteq N-Flex

== See also ==
- FeliCa
- MIFARE
- M-Pesa
- Near and far field
- Object hyperlinking
- Poken
- RFID
- RuBee
- Single Wire Protocol
- TransferJet
- Wii U GamePad
