= HCE =

HCE may refer to:

- HCE (car), a British cyclecar
- Humboldt Current ecosystem
- Choriolysin H, an enzyme
- Harvey Comics Entertainment
- Hawaii Creole English language
- Hexachloroethane
- Hierarchical Cluster Engine Project
- Host card emulation
- RNGTT, a protein
- Humphrey Chimpden Earwicker, a character in James Joyce's novel Finnegans Wake
- Halo: Combat Evolved
