= GlobalPlatform =

Information security consortium

- Abbreviation: GP
- Formation: 1999; 27 years ago
- Founder: Visa Inc.
- Type: Nonprofit, consortium
- Legal status: Association
- Purpose: Promotion of digital security technical standards
- Location: Redwood City, California, United States
- Region served: Worldwide
- Members: 100 companies (2024)
- Official language: English
- Executive Director: Ana Lattibeaudiere
- Website: globalplatform.org
- Formerly called: Visa OpenPlatform

GlobalPlatform, Inc. (formerly Visa OpenPlatform) is a non profit industry consortium for technical standards focused on the interoperability, management and security of embedded hardware such as smart cards. The GlobalPlatform specifications are the de facto standard for remote management of smart card applications.

GlobalPlatform has more than 100 members, including Visa, Mastercard, Qualcomm, T-Mobile US, Apple, and Samsung. Membership tiers include full member, observer and public entities with fees based on the level of involvement.

== History ==
Former logo of GlobalPlatform

Visa Inc. introduced the Visa OpenPlatform smart card specification in April 1998 to support the development of multi-application smart cards based on Java Card technology. In 1999, Visa donated the specifications to the OpenPlatform Consortium in order to drive wider adoption. The OpenPlatform Consortium and the specifications themselves were renamed GlobalPlatform later that year. Mastercard joined the association in 2001, who intended to include MULTOS. American Express joined in 2009. In 2025, the governance of PSA Certified was handed over to GlobalPlatform.

== Specifications ==
The specifications cover security, interoperability, and multi-application functionality. Key components include lifecycle management for secure application handling, a Card Manager for central control, and security domains for application isolation. The specifications also define secure channel protocols for data communication and offers an API.

In recent years, GlobalPlatform has expanded its scope beyond physical smart cards to include other technologies or form factors that require a secure element. These include embedded SIMs (eSIMs), Trusted Execution Environments (TEEs) that provide a secure area independent of the device operating system, and IoT devices.

The GlobalPlatform specifications and security frameworks are incorporated into other industry standards. For example, they form part of the ETSI/3GPP standards that define how SIM cards are used to authenticate users on mobile networks. GlobalPlatform is also used within the EMV standard to secure card, contactless, and smartphone-based payments.

== See also ==
- PSA Certified
- Trusted Computing Group
- EMV
- Common Access Card
