= Teleost hatching enzyme =

Teleost hatching enzyme may refer to:

- Choriolysin L, an enzyme
- Choriolysin H, an enzyme
