= NFC-WI =

NFC wired interface having 2 wires SIGIN and SIGOUT

NFC-WI is NFC wired interface having 2 wires SIGIN (signal-in) and SIGOUT (signal-out). It is also called S2C (SignalIn/SignalOut Connection) interface. In 2006, ECMA standardized the NFC wired interface with specification ECMA-373 (ECMA, 2006).

It has three modes of operation: off, wired and virtual mode. In off mode, there is no communication with the SE. In wired mode, the SE is visible to the internal NFC controller. In virtual mode, the SE is visible to external RF readers. These modes are naturally mutually exclusive.

== See also ==
- Single Wire Protocol
- Near field communication
