= PSA Certified =

Security certification scheme for the Internet of things

- Effective region: Worldwide
- Effective since: 2017
- Type of standard: Security certification scheme
- Website: psacertified.org

Platform Security Architecture (PSA) Certified is a security certification scheme for Internet of Things (IoT) hardware, software and devices. It was created by Arm Holdings, Brightsight, CAICT, Prove & Run, Riscure, TrustCB and UL as part of a global partnership.

Arm Holdings first brought forward the PSA specifications in 2017 to outline common standards for IoT security. The PSA Certified assurance scheme launched two years later in 2019.

Governance of the PSA Certified scheme was transferred from Arm and other founding partners to GlobalPlatform in September 2025.

== History ==
In 2017, Arm Holdings created Platform Security Architecture (PSA), a standard for IoT security. It was built to include an array of specifications such as threat models, security analyses, hardware and firmware architecture specifications, and an open-source firmware reference implementation. It aimed to become an industry-wide security component, with built-in security functions for both software and device manufacturers.

PSA has since evolved to become PSA Certified, a four-stage framework which can be used by IoT designers for security practices.

In 2018, the first IoT threat models and PSA documents were published.

The certification of PSA Certified launched at Embedded World in 2019, where Level 1 Certification was presented to chip vendors. A draft of Level 2 protection was presented at the same time.

Six of the seven founding stakeholders created the PSA Certified specifications, which are now make up the PSA Joint Stakeholders Agreement. The stakeholders are Arm Holdings, Brightsight, CAICT, Prove & Run, Riscure and UL. TrustCB became the seventh PSA Certified JSA member, acting as an independent Certification Body for the scheme. Out of the six other founding members, four are security test laboratories, which includes Brightsight, CAICT, Riscure and UL.

The first PSA Certified Level 2 certificates were issued to chip vendors in February 2020.

The first PSA Certified Level 3 certificate was issued in March 2021.

The first PSA Certified Level 4 certificate was issued in 2024, intended for secure element products.

== Certification ==
The PSA Joint Stakeholders Agreement outlines how members can create a worldwide standard for IoT security that enables the electronic industry to have an easy to understand security scheme. The security certification scheme documents enable a security-by-design approach to a diverse set of IoT products. The scheme starts with a security assessment of the chip and its Root of Trust (RoT) and then builds outwards to the system software and device application code. PSA Certified specifications are implementation and architecture agnostic so can be applied to any chip, software or device.

PSA Certified aims to removes industry fragmentation for IoT product manufacturers and developers in a number of ways. The world's leading IoT chip vendors are delivering system-on-chips built with a PSA Root of Trust (PSA-RoT) providing a new security system with built-in security functions that software platforms and original device manufacturers (OEMs) can make use of.

=== Functional API certification ===
A high-level set of APIs are provided by the PSA-RoT to abstract the trusted hardware and firmware used by different chip vendors. These APIs include:

- PSA Cryptography API
- PSA Attestation API
- PSA Storage API

Open source API test suites are available to check compliance for PSA Functional API Certification. An open-source implementation of the PSA Root of Trust APIs is provided by the TrustedFirmware.org project.

== Levels ==
=== Level 1 ===
The first level of security certification for PSA Certified is Level 1, aimed at chip vendors, software platforms and device manufacturers. The certification consists of questions, document review and an interview by one of the certification labs. The completed answers are accompanied with explanatory notes, checked by the certification lab. According to the PSA Certified website, language and mappings align with other important IoT requirements, such as standards and laws. These include NISTIR 8259, ETSI 303 645 and SB-327.

=== Level 2 ===
The mid-level security certification involves testing by a security lab, focusing on source code review and the PSA Root of Trust (PSA-RoT), over the course of a month to attain the level 2 certification. This process focuses on carefully defined attack methods and utilizes a set evaluation methodology. It also ensures hardware must support PSA-RoT functions and is therefore aimed at chip vendors.

According to Forbes, they believed Level 2 was likely to become the most common level for consumer IoT applications.

=== Level 3 ===
The third level extends the criteria of Level 2 to include protection against various physical attacks and side-channel attacks.

=== Level 4 iSE/SE ===
The final level requires a higher attack potential (AP=25) and is intended for Secure element products, which have even greater resistance to physical attacks. These secure elements can be used as a major component in a PSA-RoT and are either integrated directly into a chip or cryptographically paired with a chip over an external communication bus. Silicon Labs and Infineon Technologies were among the first to obtain this level.
