= Wholesale Applications Community =

Wholesale Application Community
- Type: Public limited company
- Industry: Computers
- Predecessor: 2006–2010 OMTP Bondi
- Founded: 2010
- Defunct: 17 July 2012
- Headquarters: London, United Kingdom
- Area served: Worldwide
- Services: Internet Application Platforms
- Number of employees: unknown (October - 2010)

The Wholesale Applications Community (WAC) was an organisation that was set up to create a unified and open platform to allow mobile software developers to more easily write applications usable on a variety of devices, operating systems and networks. At least 48 companies were members of the organization.

The WAC organisation came to an end with the GSMA announcing on July 17, 2012, that it reached an agreement to integrate WAC's major programs and initiatives into the GSMA. Additionally, Apigee, acquired the technology assets of WAC.

WAC was preceded by the OMTP and it completed its acquisition of the Joint Innovation Lab on 1 October 2010, accelerating the commercial launch of WAC-enabled application stores and put it in a position to be fully operational and commercially running before the end of 2010.

== Overview ==
The Wholesale Application Community application development platform is based on standard technologies such as HTML, JavaScript, and Cascading Style Sheets (CSS). Specifically this platform builds on the work of the former Open Mobile Terminal Platform Ltd.'s BONDI project, the Joint Innovation Lab (JIL) device APIs and the GSM Association's OneAPI program.

By utilizing web-based technologies, rather than relying on developers to write native applications for specific devices, the WAC alliance believes it can spur the development of more applications across a much wider range of devices. The group also aims to make certain telecoms APIs available to developers, such as those for operator billing.

== Development ==
WAC was not a Standards Development Organisation (SDO) - but used W3C Standard technologies for its platform and in particular used the W3C Widget packaging format and specification for web apps. It also furthered the use of JavaScript device APIs and these originated from the OMTP BONDI project. BONDI was developed by the now defunct Open Mobile Terminals Platform OMTP. JIL was a joint venture by China Mobile, Softbank, Verizon Wireless, Vodafone focused promoting the use of web based technologies for mobile application development. JIL compliant handsets include the SGH-i8320 (Samsung Vodafone 360 H1).

On the 27 of July 2010, WAC announced that it would "join forces" with JIL and completed the acquisition on 1 October 2010.

== Problems ==
One potential problem raised was whether a unified platform was possible in a market fragmented by different device manufactures and carriers that provide different functionality and update at different times or not at all. Vidhya Gholkar, WAC's Developer Relations Lead, said "WAC is not about competing with Apple and similar companies. Its focus is on making apps available to a much greater audience. To do this requires adherence to a core set of Web technologies and have the ability to distribute to a base larger than that served by a single device or OS."

== See also ==
- App Store (iOS)
- Android Market
- Research In Motion Application store BlackBerry App World
- Betavine is an application store from Vodafone R&D which predates most of mobile operators application stores.
- Microsoft Application store Marketplace
