= MIFARE4Mobile =

2008 technical specification published by NXP Semiconductors

MIFARE4Mobile is a technical specification published by NXP Semiconductors in December 2008 to manage MIFARE-based applications in mobile devices. The specification provides mobile network operators and service providers with a single, interoperable programming interface, easing the use of the contactless MIFARE technology in future mobile Near Field Communication (NFC) devices.

== About MIFARE4Mobile ==
The MIFARE4Mobile Industry Group consists of leading players in the Near Field Communication (NFC) ecosystem including Gemalto, Giesecke & Devrient, NXP Semiconductors, Oberthur Technologies and STMicroelectronics. MIFARE4Mobile is a technology that provides mobile network operators, trusted services managers and service providers with a single, interoperable programming interface to remotely provision and manage MIFARE-based services in embedded secure elements and SIM cards of mobile NFC devices over the air-OTA. The emergence of NFC mobile services depends on the ease by which contactless applications can be installed and used in consumers hands. Since MIFARE is the most common contactless card format used in public transport worldwide, it is essential to enable genuine interoperability for the installation and use of MIFARE in NFC mobile phones, for the whole industry to use. Any MIFARE4Mobile compliant device will work seamlessly with any MIFARE infrastructure.

The specification covers 3 functional areas:

- Wallet / User Interface APIs
- Over The Air / Trusted Service Manager APIs
- Secure Element Platform APIs

== Wallet / User Interface APIs ==
- Full interoperability with other card formats
- Ability to display card content on the phone screen

== Over The Air / Trusted Service Manager APIs ==
- Allow OTA providers to access MIFARE resources of any secure element in a consistent way
- Ensure uniform approach to MIFARE application life cycle management

== Secure Element Platform APIs ==
- Provide common access to the hardware resources of the MIFARE portfolio

Licenses for the use of the MIFARE4Mobile APIs technology is free of charge if used in conjunction with MIFARE secure elements (both as UICC or embedded) sold by NXP or licensed by NXP. The first release of the specification supported MIFARE Classic. M4M 2.0 (2013) added support for MIFARE DESFire. Future versions will include MIFARE Plus to guarantee total compatibility with existing and new contactless infrastructures.

== See also ==
- MIFARE
- NFC
- APIs
- Over-the-air programming
