= RNGTT =

Protein-coding gene in the species Homo sapiens

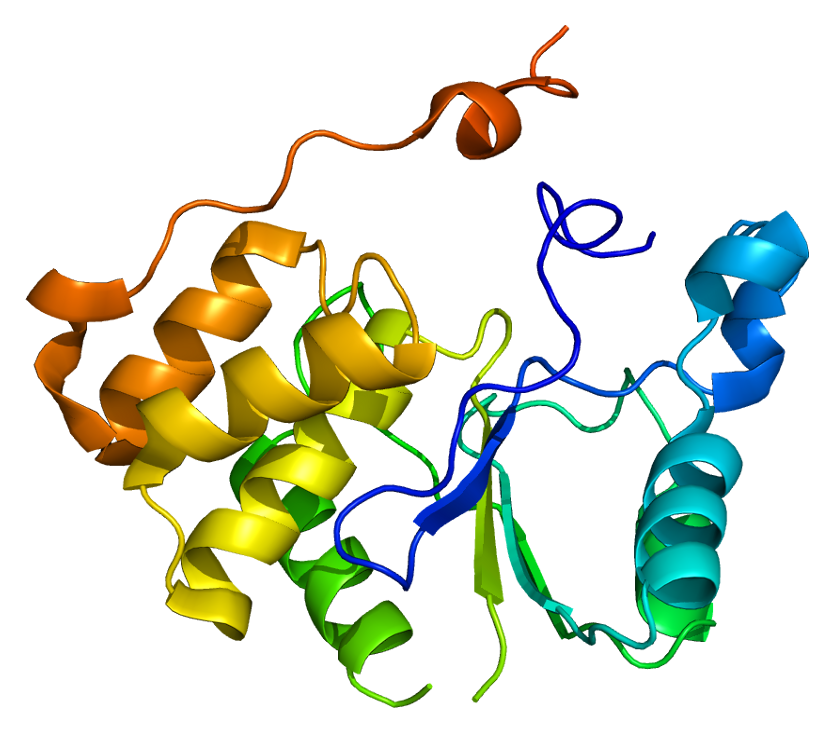

Identifiers
- Aliases: RNGTT, CAP1A, HCE, HCE1, hCAP, RNA guanylyltransferase and 5'-phosphatase
- External IDs: OMIM: 603512; MGI: 1329041; GeneCards: RNGTT
Available structures
| PDB | Ortholog search: PDBe RCSB |
| PDB | List of PDB id codes 2C46, 3S24 |
Enzyme activity
| EC # | BRENDA | ExPASy | KEGG | MetaCyc |
|---|---|---|---|---|
| 2.7.7.50 | ↗ | ↗ | ↗ | ↗ |
| 3.6.1.74 | ↗ | ↗ | ↗ | ↗ |

Gene location (Human)
| Chr. | Chromosome 6 (human) |
| Band | 6q15 | Start | 88,609,897 bp |
| Band | 6q15 | End | 88,963,618 bp |

Gene location (Mouse)
| Chr. | Chromosome 4 (mouse) |
| Band | 4|4 A5 | Start | 33,310,311 bp |
| Band | 4|4 A5 | End | 33,502,614 bp |
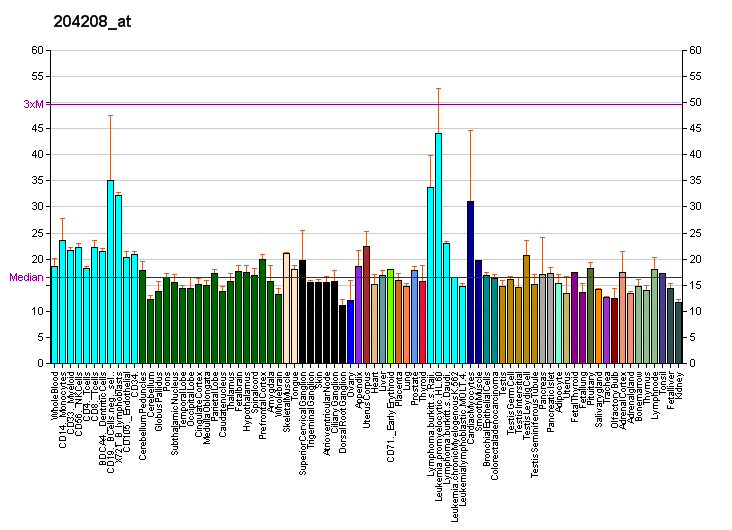

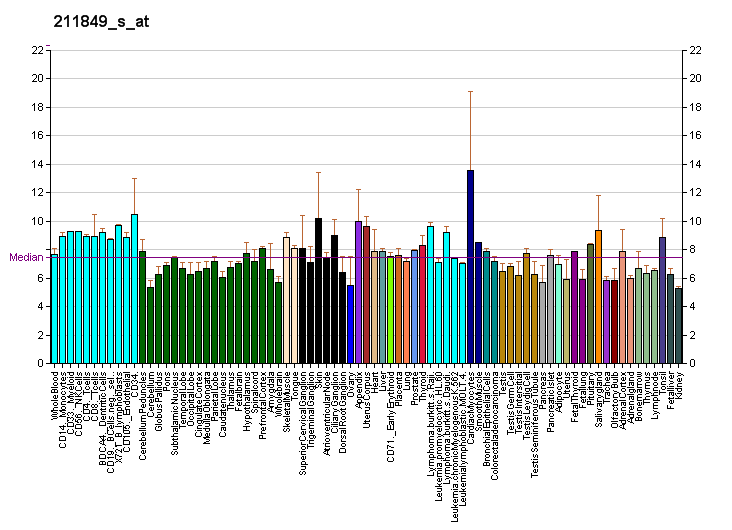

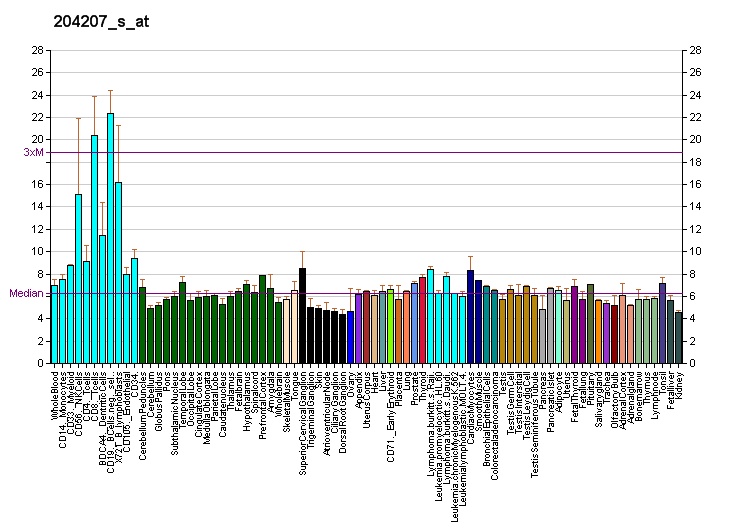
RNA expression pattern
| Bgee | Human / Mouse (ortholog); Top expressed in: cardia; nipple; pylorus; superior surface of tongue; mucosa of pharynx; ventral tegmental area; subthalamic nucleus; inferior ganglion of vagus nerve; renal medulla; trigeminal ganglion / Top expressed in: tail of embryo; genital tubercle; extraocular muscle; zygote; spermatocyte; ventricular zone; abdominal wall; epiblast; embryo; thymus; More reference expression data |
| BioGPS | More reference expression data |
Gene ontology
| Molecular function | protein tyrosine/serine/threonine phosphatase activity; phosphatase activity; protein tyrosine phosphatase activity; polynucleotide 5'-phosphatase activity; RNA guanylyltransferase activity; triphosphatase activity; nucleotidyltransferase activity; mRNA guanylyltransferase activity; catalytic activity; hydrolase activity; nucleotide binding; GTP binding; transferase activity; protein binding |
| Cellular component | nucleus; nucleoplasm |
| Biological process | mRNA processing; RNA processing; protein dephosphorylation; transcription by RNA polymerase II; dephosphorylation; 7-methylguanosine mRNA capping; metabolism; peptidyl-tyrosine dephosphorylation; polynucleotide 5' dephosphorylation; viral process |
Sources:Amigo / QuickGO
Orthologs
| Databases | NCBI: entry; OMA: entry |
| Species | Human | Mouse |
| Entrez | 8732 | 24018 |
| Ensembl | ENSG00000111880 | ENSMUSG00000028274 |
| UniProt | O60942 | O55236 |
| RefSeq (mRNA) | NM_001286426; NM_001286428; NM_003800 | NM_011884; NM_001305273 |
| RefSeq (protein) | NP_001273355; NP_001273357; NP_003791 | NP_001292202; NP_036014 |
| Location (UCSC) | Chr 6: 88.61 – 88.96 Mb | Chr 4: 33.31 – 33.5 Mb |
| PubMed search |
- Wikidata
| View/Edit Human | View/Edit Mouse |

mRNA-capping enzyme is a protein that in humans is encoded by the RNGTT gene.
