= Bondi (software) =

Mobile API framework

BONDI
- Developer: Open Mobile Terminal Platform
- Initial release: 16 February 2009; 16 years ago at MWC 2009
- Stable release: BONDI 1.1 / 11 February 2010; 15 years ago
- Platform: Windows Mobile (reference implementation), Android, BREW, iOS, Java, LiMo, Maemo, Palm OS, RIM, Symbian, bada
- License: Apache 2.0
- Website: bondi.omtp.org

BONDI (named after Bondi Beach) is an API framework aimed at mobile devices. OMTP launched the BONDI initiative, which defined new interfaces (JavaScript APIs) and a security framework (based on XACML policy description) to enable the access to mobile phone functionality (e.g. camera, location, messaging, persistent data) from a browser or widget engine in a secure way.

BONDI supports widget-based applications as well as web-based applications.

== History ==
Work on BONDI started in 2008. The first BONDI widget, based on a preliminary version of the 1.0 specification, was shown at Mobile World Congress in February 2009.

Version 1.0 of the API specification released on June 2, 2009, with a maintenance release (1.01) following on July 30, 2009.

Version 1.1 of the API was released as stable on February 11, 2010.

In February 2010, at the Mobile World Congress, the Samsung Wave was released as the first mobile phone to contain BONDI as a built-in API, as part of its bada platform.

== Policies ==
To safeguard users from malicious web applications, BONDI defines a policy layer between the API and the device. Policies can be set on a widget provider level (for signed widgets), on a widget level, or on an API call-by-call level for web pages. Every widget carries a manifest declaring the APIs to be used by that widget, allowing users to install (or deny installation) based on the function the widget intends to use.
