= Open Mobile Terminal Platform =

Forum

- Type: Industry Forum
- Industry: Wireless Services
- Founded: 2004
- Products: "Industry recommendations", "BONDI initiative"
- Website: www.omtp.org

The Open Mobile Terminal Platform (OMTP) was a forum created by mobile network operators to discuss standards with manufacturers of mobile phones and other mobile devices. During its lifetime, the OMTP included manufacturers such as Huawei, LG Electronics, Motorola, Nokia, Samsung and Sony Ericsson.

== Membership ==
OMTP was originally set up by leading mobile operators. At the time it transitioned into the Wholesale Applications Community at the end of June 2010, there were nine full members: AT&T, Deutsche Telekom AG, KT, Orange, Smart Communications, Telecom Italia, Telefónica, Telenor and Vodafone. OMTP also had the support of two sponsors, Ericsson and Nokia.

== Activities ==
OMTP recommendations have hugely helped to standardise mobile operator terminal requirements, and its work has gone towards helping to defragment and deoptionalise operators' recommendations. OMTP's focus was on gathering and driving mobile terminal requirements, and publishing their findings in their Recommendations. OMTP was technology neutral, with its recommendations intended for deployment across the range of technology platforms, operating systems (OS) and middleware layers.

OMTP is perhaps best known for its work in the field of mobile security, but its work encompassed the full range of mobile device capabilities. OMTP published recommendations in 2007 and early 2008 on areas such as Positioning Enablers, Advanced Device Management, IMS and Mobile VoIP. Later, the Advanced Trusted Environment: OMTP TR1 and its supporting document, 'Security Threats on Embedded Consumer Devices' were released, with the endorsement of the UK Home Secretary, Jacqui Smith.

OMTP also published requirements document addressing support for advanced SIM cards. This document also defines advanced profiles for Smart Card Web Server, High Speed Protocol, Mobile TV and Contactless.

OMTP has also made significant progress in getting support for the use of micro-USB as a standard connector for data and power. A full list of their recommendations can be found at GSMA.com.

=== BONDI ===
In 2008, OMTP launched a new initiative called BONDI (named after the Australian beach); the initiative defined new interfaces (JavaScript APIs) and a security framework (based on XACML policy description) to enable the access to mobile phone functionalities (Application Invocation, Application Settings, Camera, Communications Log, Gallery, Location, Messaging, Persistent Data, Personal Information, Phone Status, User Interaction) from browser and widget engine securely. The BONDI initiative also had an open source Reference Implementation at bondi.omtp.org. An Approved Release 1.0 of BONDI was issued in June 2009. An open source project for a comprehensive BONDI SDK was started at bondisdk.org.

=== Universal Charging System ===
In February 2009, OMTP expanded its Local Connectivity specification (based on micro-USB) to describe requirements for a common charger and common connector to enable sharing the same battery charger through different phones. The OMTP Common Charging and Local Data Connectivity was adopted by GSM Association in the Universal Charging System (UCS) initiative. This has been further endorsed by the CTIA, and the ITU. In June 2009 the European Commission reached an agreement with several major mobile phone providers on requirements for a common External Power Supply (EPS) to be compatible with new data-enabled phones sold in the European Union. The EPS shares most of the key attributes of the UCS charger.

=== Wholesale Applications Community ===
In June 2010, the OMTP transitioned itself into the new Wholesale Applications Community. All OMTP activities ceased at that time and were either taken over within the WAC organisation or other standards or industry associations. In turn, in July 2012 WAC itself was closed, with the OMTP standards being transferred to GSMA, and other assets and personnel transferring to Apigee.

== See also ==
- Mobile security
- TRRS standards
