= Single Wire Protocol =

The Single Wire Protocol (SWP) is a specification for a single-wire connection between the SIM card and a near-field communication (NFC) chip in a cell phone. It was under final review by the European Telecommunications Standards Institute (ETSI).

SWP is an interface between contactless frontend (CLF) and universal integrated circuit card (UICC/SIM card chip). It is a contact-based protocol that is used for contactless communication. C6 pin of UICC is connected to CLF for SWP support. It is a bit-oriented full-duplex protocol, i.e. transmission and reception are possible at the same time. CLF acts as a master, and UICC as a slave. CLF provides the UICC with energy, a transmission clock, data, and a signal for bus management. The data to be transmitted are represented by the binary states of voltage and current on the single wire.

== See also ==
- 1-Wire
- NFC wired interface
- HCI

== Sources ==
1. ETSI SCP Activity Report 2007.
2. The Register, The future of the SIM hangs by a single Wire 2008.
3. GSM Association: Requirements For SWP NFC Handsets V2 2008.
4. Fast Company: Nokia's 2011 Smartphones Have Built-In Wireless Payment Tech: Take That, Apple!
