= Poken =

Cloud-based event management platform

- Type: Technology company
- Founded: December 2007
- Founder: Stéphane Doutriaux
- Headquarters: Redwood City, United States
- Website: www.poken.com

Poken is a cloud-based event management platform utilized by trade shows and exhibitions, corporate and association events, and sports and youth events. The modular platform includes features and services such as registration and badging, match-making, meeting scheduling, mobile apps, NFC interactive USB devices, lead generation devices, gamification, access control, and metrics reporting.

== History ==
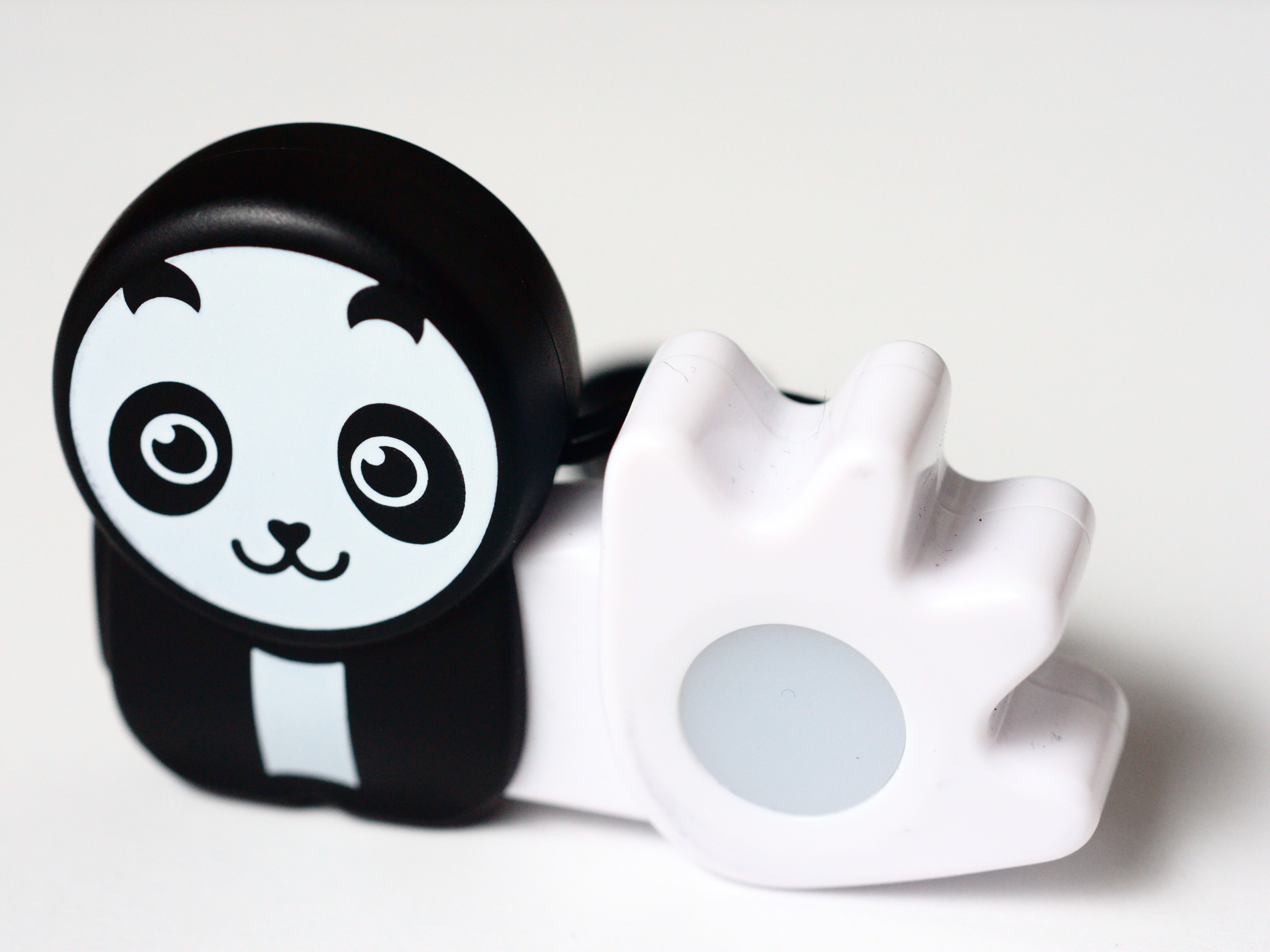
A Poken interactive USB device

The company, Poken S.A., was founded in December 2007 in Lausanne, Switzerland, by Stéphane Doutriaux. The founder developed the initial concept of an interactive USB device for sharing personal information and social networks by touch while doing his MBA at IMD, a business school in Lausanne. This project was inspired by an application running on the IMD campus developed by Gabriel Klein in 2004, one of the first employees of Poken. The technology was developed in collaboration with the Berner Fachhochschule, a university of applied sciences in Biel, Switzerland. The project started in July 2008 and ended in December of the same year. The first release of the interactive USB device, called ‘Sparks,’ was in January 2009. Since the initial development of the Poken 'Spark,' the company has expanded its lines of products and services.

Poken has a network of partners and resellers in over 12 countries, with headquarters in London, Lausanne, Dubai, and New York, and has delivered events in over 80 international locations. In 2017, Poken was acquired by GES.

== Products and services ==
Poken is a modular, end-to-end platform that consists of both software and hardware products. The Poken interactive USB device utilizes Near Field Communication (NFC) technology to exchange online social networking data between two devices. The primary information exchanged via the Poken is a ‘social business card,’ a digital replacement for a physical business card. By touching two devices together, a unique ID is exchanged that links to contact information on the Poken website. Contact information acquired using the Poken can be uploaded to the Poken website using a built-in USB connector. The user's Poken contact card can contain any information they want to share, for example, URLs, mobile numbers, email addresses, and locations. It can also be configured with links to the user on over 40 social networking sites.

When used with Poken Touch points, the Poken interactive USB can collect digital content via touch, such as brochures and magazines, interact with installations such as media walls and digital surveys, and be used for access control and meeting check-in.

== Awards ==
- Swiss ICT Award- Best Newcomer, 2009
- Tech Crunch Europa- Best Real World Gadget, 2009
- Red Herring Europe- Top 100 Finalist, 2011
- Mobile World Congress- Best Innovation in Mobile Advertising, 2012
- E.X.C.I.T.E - Innovation in the Event Industry: Silver, 2012
- GMIC Green Meeting Industry Award (GMIC NCC),2015
- CTI/KTI Swiss Government Innovation Grant- 2016
