= PayMate =

Indian digital and financial services company

PayMate India Ltd.
- Formerly: PayMate India Pvt. Ltd.
- Industry: Financial services
- Founded: May 2006
- Founder: Ajay Adiseshan, Managing Director & Chairman
- Headquarters: Mumbai, India, Mumbai
- Key people: Vishvanathan Subramanian (Ravi), CFO & Director
- Products: PayMate
- Services: B2B payments platform & solutions
- Subsidiaries: PayMate Payments Services Provider LLC (PayMate LLC), PayMate India SPC
- Website: paymate.in

PayMate is a business-to-business (B2B) digital and financial services company headquartered in Mumbai.

== History ==
The company was launched in May 2006 as India's first mobile payments provider that allowed consumers to use their mobile phones to pay for online and retail purchases, make utility bill payments, purchase tickets, etc. via their bank account, credit card or a prepaid account. The PayPOS application, that allowed small businesses to accept credit and debit cards and process electronic transactions directly on their mobile phones at the point of sale devices (POS), was also launched, shaping up the company's B2C offerings and disrupting the Indian payment landscape.

A person-to-person (P2P) mobile money transfer facility was also offered in association with Tata Indicom and Corporation Bank launched Green Money Transfer.

In 2013, PayMate began focusing on B2B payments that automated payables and receivables, and was processing in excess of $500M in annualized payment processing run rate.

In due course, this business payment platform evolved, making the company a strategic B2B partner for Visa in 2018. This partnership flourished and led to PayMate's expansion into CEMEA region to offer its business payment platform.

As there was no more requirement of the wallet license, in February 2017, the company gave up its RBI issued prepaid wallet license, discontinuing all its B2C payments activity and focus only on B2B payments opportunities across geographies.

PayMate India Lts. filed its Draft Red Herring Prospectus (DRHP) with capital markets regulator Sebi to float its initial public offering (IPO) in May, 2022.

== Acquisition ==
PayMate acquired lender Zaitech Technologies Pvt. Ltd in 2018.
