= Choriolysin H =

Enzyme

Identifiers
- EC no.: 3.4.24.67
- CAS no.: 177529-16-7

Databases
- IntEnz: IntEnz view
- BRENDA: BRENDA entry
- ExPASy: NiceZyme view
- KEGG: KEGG entry
- MetaCyc: metabolic pathway
- PRIAM: profile
- PDB structures: RCSB PDB PDBe PDBsum
Search
- PMC: articles
- PubMed: articles
- NCBI: proteins

Choriolysin H (EC 3.4.24.67, teleost hatching enzyme (component), high choriolytic enzyme (HCE)) is an enzyme. This enzyme catalyses the following chemical reaction

Hydrolysis of the inner layer of fish egg envelope. Also hydrolysis of casein and small molecule substrates such as succinyl-Leu-Leu-Val-Tyr-7-(4-methyl)coumarylamide

This enzyme is present in teleost fish Oryzias latipes.
