= MULTOS =

Multi-application smart card operating system

MULTOS is a multi-application smart card operating system, that enables a smart card to carry a variety of applications, from chip and pin application for payment to on-card biometric matching for secure ID and ePassport. MULTOS is an open standard whose development is overseen by the MULTOS Consortium – a body composed of companies which have an interest in the development of the OS and includes smart card and silicon manufacturers, payment card schemes, chip data preparation, card management and personalization system providers, and smart card solution providers. There are more than 30 companies involved in the consortium.

One of the key differences of MULTOS compared to other types of smart card OS, is that it implements a patented public key cryptography-based mechanism by which the manufacture, issuance and dynamic updates of MULTOS smartcards in the field is entirely under an issuer's control using digital certificates rather than symmetric key sharing. This control is enabled through the use of a Key Management Authority (KMA), a special kind of certification authority. The KMA provides card issuers with cryptographic information required to bind the card to the issuer, initialize the card for use, and generate permission certificates for the loading and deleting of applications under the control of the issuer.

Application providers can retrieve and verify the public key certificate of an individual issuer's card, and encrypt their proprietary application code and confidential personalisation data using that card's unique public key. This payload is digitally signed using the private key of the application provider. The KMA, on request from the card issuer, signs the application provider's public key and application code has and creates a digital certificate (the Application Load Certificate) that authorises the application to be loaded to an issuer's card or group of cards. Applications are therefore protected for integrity and confidentiality and loaded to a card without any party sharing symmetric keys and therefore needing to trust any other party sharing the card platform – including the card issuer. Both the Application Provider and Card Issuer know that only specific, authorised applications from authorised parties can be loaded to any specific card.

Hundreds of millions of MULTOS smart cards have been issued by banks and governments all around the world, for projects ranging from contactless payment, Internet authentication and loyalty, to national identity with digital signature, ePassport with biometrics, health care and military base and network access control.

== Technical overview ==
A MULTOS implementation provides an operating system upon which resides a virtual machine. The virtual machine provides:

- Application run-time environment.
- Memory management.
- Application loading and deleting.

=== Run-time environment ===
The run-time environment operates within the application space. This consists of code space and data space. The code, developed in the C language and compiled into MULTOS bytecodes is interpreted every time it is executed. The virtual machine performs code validity and memory access checks during execution of the code. The data space is divided into static and dynamic portions. Static memory is persistent and transaction protection ensures the integrity of application's stored data.

The key component of dynamic memory is the last in, first out (LIFO) stack as this makes using the various functions much easier. A MULTOS chip is a stack machine, which makes use of this dynamic memory to pass parameters and perform calculations. In addition, the Input/output buffer resides in another dynamic memory segment.

=== Memory management ===
Each application resides with a rigorously enforced application memory space, which consists of the application code and data segments. This means that an application has full access rights to its own code and data, but can not directly access that of another application. If an application attempts to access an area outside its space, it results in an abnormal end to process

=== Application loading and deleting ===
A MULTOS card permits the loading and deleting of applications at any point in the card's active life cycle. A load can take place once the application and its corresponding certificate are transmitted to the chip. A delete is permitted if a certificate that corresponds to a loaded application is transmitted to the chip.
