= Secure element =

Isolated and secure electronic component

In computer science and cybersecurity, a secure element (SE) is a secure operating system (OS) in a tamper-resistant processor or secure component. It can protect assets (root of trust, sensitive data, cryptographic keys and certificates, and applications) against high-level software and hardware attacks. Applications that process this sensitive data on an SE are isolated and so operate within a controlled environment not affected by software (including possible malware) found elsewhere on the OS.

The hardware and embedded software meet the requirements of the Security IC Platform Protection Profile [PP 0084] including resistance to physical tampering scenarios described within it. More than 96 billion secure elements were produced and shipped between 2010 and 2021.

SEs exist in various form factors, as devices such as smart cards, UICCs, or smart microSD cards, or embedded, or integrated, as parts of larger devices. SEs are an evolution of the chips in earlier smart cards, which have been adapted to suit the needs of numerous use cases, such as smartphones, tablets, set-top boxes, wearables, connected cars, and other internet of things (IoT) devices. The technology is widely used by technology firms such as Oracle, Apple and Samsung.

SEs provide secure isolation, storage and processing for applications (called applets) they host while being isolated from the external world (e.g. rich OS and application processor when embedded in a smartphone) and from other applications running on the SE. Java Card and MULTOS are the most deployed standardized multi-application operating systems currently used to develop applications running on SEs.

Since 1999, GlobalPlatform has been the body responsible for standardizing secure element technologies to support a dynamic model of application management in a multi-actor model. GlobalPlatform also runs Functional and Security Certification programmes for secure elements, and hosts a list of Functional Certified and Security Certified products. GlobalPlatform technology is also embedded in other standards such as ETSI SCP (now SET) since release 7. A Common Criteria Secure Element Protection Profile has been released targeting EAL4+ level with ALC_DVS.2 and AVA_VAN.5 extensions to standardize the security features of a secure element across markets.
