= SIM connector =

Device for connecting SIM cards to mobile devices

A Subscriber Identity Module (SIM) card connector includes a connector body, the connector body defines a receptacle channel that extends inwardly from the fr Joont and the receptacle channel further defines a first hole and a second hole. Pluralities of terminals mount in the middle of the connector body; a switch terminal mounts in the connector body. The switch terminal has a fixing portion received in the first hole and a contacting portion received in the second hole, the contacting portion forms an arced surface, the top of the arced surface is inserted into the second hole and protrudes above the top surface of the housing base in the receiving cavity.

The SIM card connector comprises a body having an accommodating space for disposing a SIM card and multiple connected-through receptacles for receiving conducting terminals. Through the conducting terminals, an electrical signaling contact with the SIM card can be made. The connector further includes a guide arm having a first salient block and a second salient block, the first salient block and the second salient block are disposed on the respective sides of the guide arm and a cover is connected to the body for covering the accommodating space. Furthermore, the cover may connect with the guide arm through a pivot; the cover further comprises a groove. When the second salient block is moved, the first salient block shifts inside the groove and pushes the SIM card out from the accommodating space.

Through the rapid development in wireless transmission technologies, all kinds of portable electronic products are produced. One of the most common and versatile electronic products is the mobile communication device. In a mobile telephone communication system, a mobile phone number generally corresponds to a SIM card. As soon as a mobile phone user combines the SIM card with the mobile phone, the system is immediately able to identify the user, providing the kind of transmission services and data gathering services required for billing purposes.

== See also ==
- Subscriber Identity Module
- International Mobile Equipment Identity
- SIM lock
- SIM cloning
- Dual SIM
- UICC
- Universal Subscriber Identity Module
- IP Multimedia Services Identity Module
- R-UIM
- W-SIM
- Smart card
- MEID
- Valimo Mobile Authentication Client (VMAC)
- Mobile signature
