= EUIMID =

Unique identifier for R-UIM or CSIM in CDMA2000

EUIMID (expanded UIMID) is a unique identifier for an R-UIM (Removable User Identity Module) or CSIM (CDMA SIM application) card in CDMA2000 cellular systems that replaces the older UIMID identifier. There are two forms of EUIMID, known as Short Form (SF_EUIMID) and Long Form (LF_EUIMID). Both produce a 32-bit pseudo-UIMID (pUIMID) with 0x80 in the upper 8 bits and the least significant 24 bits of the SHA-1 hash of the entire SF_EUIMID or the entire ICCID EF (for LF_EUIMID) in the lower 24 bits.

The EUIMID (and UIMID) are hardware identifiers that do not change throughout the life of the card they identify. Their most important characteristic is that they are globally unique, no two R-UIM or CSIM cards should ever be given the same number. Secondly, they can identify the issuer of the code (likely a mobile phone operator in the case of LF_EUIMID, and an R-UIM or CSIM card manufacturer in the case of SF_EUIMID). The pseudo-UIMID is not unique, but can satisfy most uses of UIMID. Where this is not possible, or not desirable, another unique identifier (such as EUIMID) should be used instead or the requirement for uniqueness should be removed.

== Short Form EUIMID (SF_EUIMID) ==
The Short Form EUIMID is based on the 56-bit MEID and is allocated from the same numbering space by the current Global Hexadecimal Administrator (GHA), the TIA. This form requires new files within the R-UIM defined in 3GPP2 specification C.S0023-C v1.0 (or higher). This was published by the TIA as TIA-820-C.

The SF_EUIMID has the unique ability to override the phone’s own MEID in signaling. This is controlled by a flag inside the R-UIM stored in bit 2 of the UsgInd (Usage Indicator) elementary file (EF). This may make it easier to provision a R-UIM that is manufactured without other unique identifiers (such as MIN or IMSI). The tradeoff is that the phone hardware cannot be easily identified. This tradeoff was removed in 2008 by the ability to specify MEID or EUIMID in OTASP signaling and in 2009 by the addition of these options to the CDMA air interface StatusRequest message. The term MEID_ME is used to distinguish the hardware identity of the phone from the MEID protocol element that may be the EUIMID.

== Long Form EUIMID (LF_EUIMID) ==
The Long Form EUIMID is the ICCID that has been present in many generations of smart cards, including the SIM cards for GSM. This is composed of up to 18 BCD digits -- up to 72 bits. The storage allocated for the ICCID is, however, 80 bits, so it is recommended that the Luhn check digit be included plus a padding digit (0xf). Importantly, it is recommended in Version 2.0 of C.S0023-C that the pseudo-UIMID is generated from all 80 stored bits.

The LF_EUIMID first became externally accessible in 2008 with OTASP specification C.S0066-0 v2.0. In 2009, the CDMA air interface was also upgraded to the so-called 'Release E' which allows the transmission of all available identifiers in the StatusRequest message. If an R-UIM or CSIM with Expanded UIMID is inserted in a phone the identifier that is usually transmitted as the ESN protocol element over the radio interface is the 32-bit pseudo-UIMID.
