= (U)SIM interface =

The (U)SIM interface is the connecting point of the mobile phone and the UICC with its SIM or USIM application.

== Standardisation of the (U)SIM interface ==
The UICC with the SIM or USIM application plays an important role in mobile telephony as it is the secure element identifying a subscriber in the network and allowing MNOs to bill the respective account. Hence it is crucial to have standardised features e.g. placing phone calls or sending SMS working throughout the global network with all available handsets and (U)SIM cards resp. UICCs. Developing globally applicable standards for communication technologies is the task of standardisation bodies such as ETSI (European Telecommunications Standards Institute, 3GPP (Third Generation Partnership Project) and 3GPP2 (Third Generation Partnership Project 2). In case of the (U)SIM interface, the most important specifications are:

- ETSI TS 102 221 - UICC-Terminal interface; Physical and logical characteristics
- 3GPP TS 31.101 - UICC-terminal interface; Physical and logical characteristics
- 3GPP TS 31.102 - Characteristics of the Universal Subscriber Identity Module (USIM) application

== Standardisation of test scenarios ==
To ensure that actual implementations of such standardised features are interoperable, the standardisation bodies also create so called test specifications. These document detail exact procedures on how to test that an implementation under test acts according to conformance requirements. Important test specifications for the (U)SIM interface are:

- ETSI TS 102 230 - Physical, electrical and logical test specification
- 3GPP TS 31.121 - Universal Subscriber Identity Module (USIM) application test specification

== Type approval for mobile terminals ==
Before mobile network operators select new handset types to be offered to their customers, they want to be sure the new handset will support all features and work in combination with new and existing UICCs. Hence, they request the manufacturers to perform those test cases defined by the standardisation bodies. Therefore, certification organisations such as the GCF (Global Certification Forum), CCF (CDMA Certification Forum) and PTCRB (PCS Type Certification Review Board) have been founded. These organisations are associations of the leading network operators, device manufacturers and other stakeholders such as test system suppliers and test houses. They select relevant test cases and define an independent certification programme for handset type approval.
