= ISIM =

ISIM or iSIM may refer to:

- International Society for Invertebrate Morphology
- Institute for the Study of International Migration
- IP Multimedia Services Identity Module
- Integrated Science Instrument Module
- iSIM (subscriber identity module), a type of SIM directly integrated into a device's chipset

== See also ==
:
