= Tecdesk =

Designer and manufacturer of deskphones

- Company type: Private
- Industry: Telecommunications
- Founded: 2008; 18 years ago
- Headquarters: London, United Kingdom
- Products: SIM operated deskphones
- Owner: Santok Group
- Number of employees: 200 (2014)
- Website: www.tecdesk.com

Tecdesk is a British designer and manufacturer of SIM operated deskphones. Founded in 2008 with headquarters in London, Tecdesk is part of the Santok Group that includes STK (mobile accessories), Tecmobile (mobile handsets) and thumbsUP! (gifts and gadgets). As of 2014 it has 200 employees. Tecdesk operates in the UK, European, U.S and Mexican markets.

The company supplies SIM operated deskphones for the Vodafone OneNet and BT One Phone single-hosted business services in the UK. Tecdesk products conform to the Global Certification Forum standard. This endorsement ensures its phones operate on all global mobile networks.

== History ==
The company introduced the first Android-powered SIM operated deskphone, the Tecdesk 5500i in February 2013. The phone offered HD voice call quality, Wi-Fi hotspot functionality allowing eight devices to connect to a private WLAN, Wi-Fi back up connection should the 3G / GSM network get interrupted, support for Android apps, a built-in camera for video conference calling, phonebook capacity for 6000 entries and a colour capacitive touchscreen.
