= FDN =

FDN may refer to:

== Organizations ==
- Dolphin Air, a defunct Ermirati airline
- Flying Doctors Nigeria, an air ambulance service
- French Data Network, a French non-profit Internet service provider
- Fruta del Norte mine, an Ecuadorian gold mine

== Politics ==
- National Democratic Front (Mexico) (Spanish: Frente Democrático Nacional), a defunct political coalition
- National Democratic Front (Peru) (Spanish: Frente Democrático Nacional), a defunct political party
- New Democratic Forces (French: Forces démocratiques nouvelles), a defunct political party in the Republic of the Congo
- Nicaraguan Democratic Force (Spanish: Fuerza Democrática Nicaragüense), a Nicaraguan Contra group
- Nigerien Democratic Front (French: Front démocratique nigérien), a defunct political party of Niger

== Other uses ==
- Fairbanks Daily News-Miner, a newspaper in Fairbanks, Alaska, US
- Faridabad New Town railway station, in Haryana, India
- Fixed Dialing Number, in telephony
