= Vergatario =

Mobile phone

- Brand: ZTE
- Manufacturer: Vetelca ZTE Telkom Flexi (Indonesia)
- Type: Feature phone
- Availability by region: Venezuela: Movilnet Indonesia: Telkom Flexi
- Form factor: Bar
- CPU: Qualcomm QSC6030, ARM926EJ-S
- Memory: 16 MB
- Storage: 32 MB (3.94MB Useable)
- Removable storage: microSD
- SIM: RUIM
- Rear camera: Yes
- Display: 1.8 in (46 mm) diagonal TFT LCD; 128×160 px 4:5 aspect-ratio wide-screen 65K colors
- Sound: CMX 4.1
- Model: ZTE C-C366

The Vergatario is a model of CDMA mobile phone designed by the Venezuelan state owned corporation Vtelca, with assistance from the Chinese manufacturer ZTE. The "Vergatario" name was announced by Venezuelan President Hugo Chávez. Vergatario is not one of rebranded ZTE phones because it is exclusively designed in Venezuela.

== Design ==
The Vergatario is a CDMA phone that includes a 0.3mp VGA 640x480 camera, and a built-in MP3, MP4 media player among its features. Initially, it was highly subsidized by the Venezuelan government, priced at 30BsF (roughly US$6.99), and may be the world's most inexpensive mobile phone. The latest version is more expensive, at 2450 BsF, roughly 389 dollars at 2013 rates.

"Vergatario" is a Spanish word, a vulgar adjective used in Venezuela meaning optimal. Venezuelans had mixed reactions to the name "Vergatario" after the late President Chávez's Mother's Day broadcast. Some said it was "gross" and "vulgar", while others considered it harmless. Chávez named the phone himself. He introduced the Vergatario to Venezuelans on the 10 May 2009 (Mother's Day in Venezuela) broadcast of his television talk show Aló Presidente, during which he used a Vergatario to phone his mother.

The Venezuelan state owned corporation Vetelca produces the Vergatario in Venezuela using some parts from the Chinese company ZTE. Production began in 2009. 5,000 Vergatarios went to market on 9 May in anticipation of Mother's Day sales. 600,000 phones will be produced by the end of 2009, and production will increase during the following two years with 2,000,000 phones planned by the end of 2011. Chávez expressed his desire that "everyone get the opportunity to get their hands on a Vergatario".

Movilnet, Venezuela's state-owned wireless network, is the carrier for the Vergatario.

"This telephone will be the biggest seller not only in Venezuela but the world. Whoever doesn't have a Vergatario is nothing."

— President Hugo Chávez
