= USAT =

USAT may refer to:

- USA Today, national daily newspaper
- USIM Application Toolkit, a standard which enables the USIM to initiate actions which can be used for various value-added services delivered to 3G mobile devices (USAT is the equivalent of STK for 3G cellular networks)
- United States Army Transport, a designation given to United States Army troop transports; the abbreviation is placed before the name of the ship
- USA Triathlon, the national governing body for the multi-sport disciplines of triathlon, duathlon, aquathlon and winter triathlon in the United States
- UNIQUE-SAT, a special case of the Boolean Satisfiability problem (Computer Science)
