= CDMA subscriber identity module =

A CDMA subscriber identity module (CSIM) is an application to support CDMA2000 phones that runs on a UICC, with a file structure derived from the R-UIM card. By porting the application to the UICC (Universal Integrated Circuit Card), a card with CSIM, SIM, and USIM can operate with all major cellular technologies worldwide. The CSIM application allows users to change phones by simply removing the smart card from one mobile phone and inserting it into another mobile phone or broadband telephony device supporting the CDMA2000 radio interface.

== CSIM application file system ==
The CSIM application contains a file system with a number of parameters needed to operate on cdmaOne/CDMA2000 ("CDMA") networks. Each parameter, or a group of related parameters, is specified with a unique identifier with an implicit or explicit length, and is considered a separate Elementary File (EF). The following examples are taken from the 3GPP2 specification.

- Encryption keys, provisioned by the operator
- Phone number
- Call counts
- Short Message Service parameters
- Received Short Messages (255 bytes maximum per message)
- IMSI (international mobile subscriber identifier)
- TMSI (temporary mobile subscriber identifier, for position security)
- UIMID (hardware identifier). It will be a pseudo (hashed) value if EUIMID is in use.
- EUIMID, either short form (based on MEID) or long form (based on ICCID)
- ICCID. Present even if it is not used as EUIMID.
- MEID (hardware identifier)
- Analog (AMPS) operational parameters
- CDMA2000 home identifiers, such as SID and NID
- CDMA2000 zone-based registration parameters, telling the handset to register when it changes to a new operator-defined zone (SID/NID)
- CDMA2000 distance-based registration parameters, telling the handset to register when it travels a certain distance (each CDMA2000 transmitter emits its GPS location)
- Random parameters (slot cycle index) to use during CSMA access probes
- List of services available. If a service is not indicated as available in the CSIM, the mobile equipment shall not select this service. Examples include "Call Control", "SMS", "BCMCS Broadcast", "IP Location", etc. If a service is not in this table, the handset will not provide the service.
- Multimode System Selection (MMSS) parameters
