= UICC =

UICC may refer to:

- Universal integrated circuit card, also known as a SIM card
- Union for International Cancer Control, non-governmental organization for tackling cancer
- University of Illinois at Chicago Circle, see University of Illinois at Chicago
