= Mobile testing =

Mobile testing may refer to:

- Mobile-device testing
- Mobile application testing
