= SIM operated deskphone =

A SIM operated deskphone is a home or office-based deskphone that operates using a mobile SIM card. Connecting to a 3G/GSM virtual Private Automated Branch Exchange (PABX) network set up by a mobile operator, a SIM operated deskphone combines the features and flexibility of a mobile phone with the functionality of a traditional deskphone.

Unlike fixed line system, SIM operated deskphone feature built in batteries so can operate without wires if required and be easily moved and installed from office to office, location to location.

Hardware

Leading design and manufacturers of SIM operated deskphones include Tecdesk, Huawei and Jablocom. SIM operated deskphone models range from standard deskphone functionality such as built-in display, caller ID, phonebook, mute, redial, loudspeaker, conference call facility, memory keys and SMS support, through to HD voice call quality, 3G connection to PC and laptop and Bluetooth wireless connection to headsets. Some SIM operated deskphones are powered by an Android operating system.

Tecdesk released the first Android powered SIM operated deskphone, the Smart 5500, in February 2013 and features include compatibility with Android apps, Virtual presence support, Wi-Fi hotspot functionality, Wi-Fi back up connection should the 3G / GSM network get interrupted, phonebook capacity for 6000 entries and a colour capacitive touchscreen.

Services

UK telecommunication companies, BT and Vodafone have adopted SIM operated deskphones as part of their single-hosted business service communications, One Phone and One Net.
