= International Society for Invertebrate Morphology =

International Society for Invertebrate Morphology (ISIM) was founded during the 1st International Congress on Invertebrate Morphology, in Copenhagen, August 2008. The objectives of the society are to promote international collaboration and provide educational opportunities and training on invertebrate morphology, and to organize and promote the international congresses of invertebrate morphology, international meetings and other forms of scientific exchange.

== Meetings ==
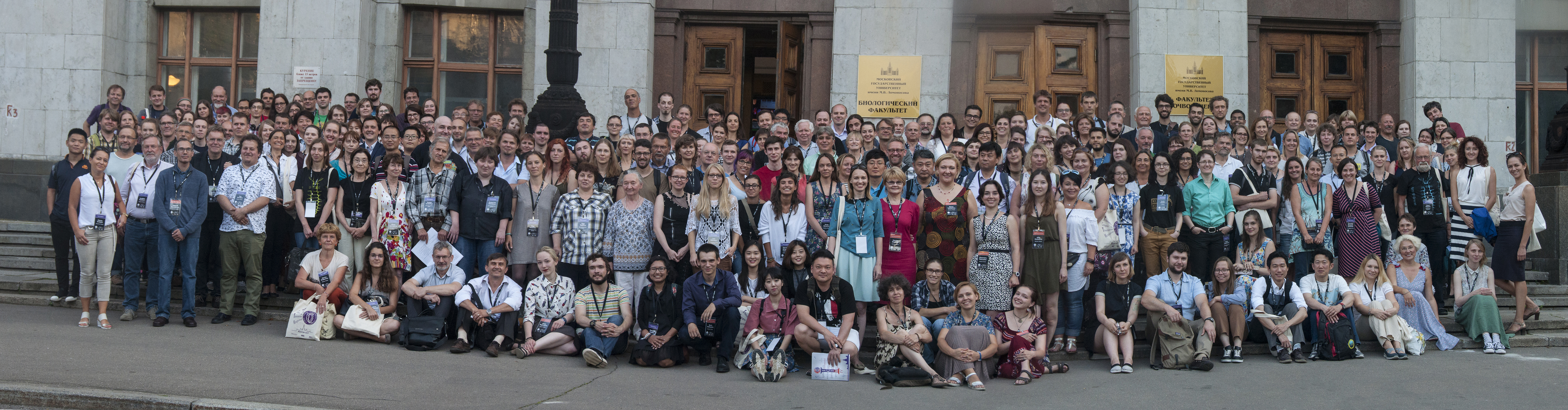
The participants of ICIM-4 in Moscow, August 2017

- ICIM 1 (2008) University of Copenhagen, Denmark
- ICIM 2 (2011) Harvard University, Cambridge Massachusetts, USA
- ICIM 3 (2014) Humboldt-Universität zu Berlin, Germany
- ICIM 4 (2017) Lomonosov Moscow State University, Russia
- ICIM 5 (2022), Vienna, Austria
- ICIM 6 (2025), Chile
