= Removable User Identity Module =

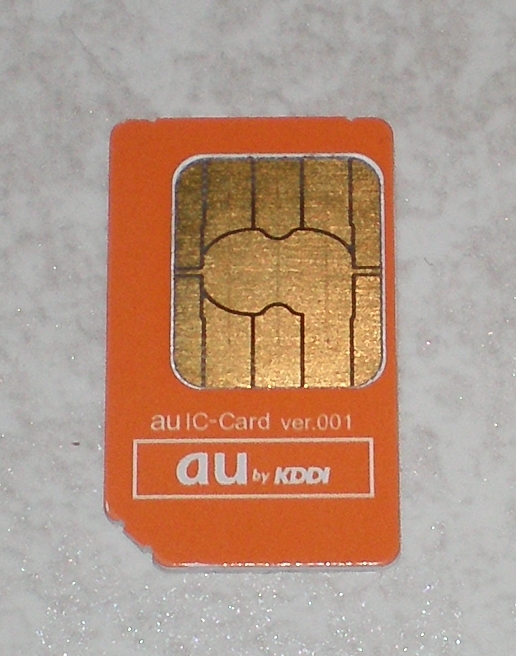
KDDI's au IC-Card

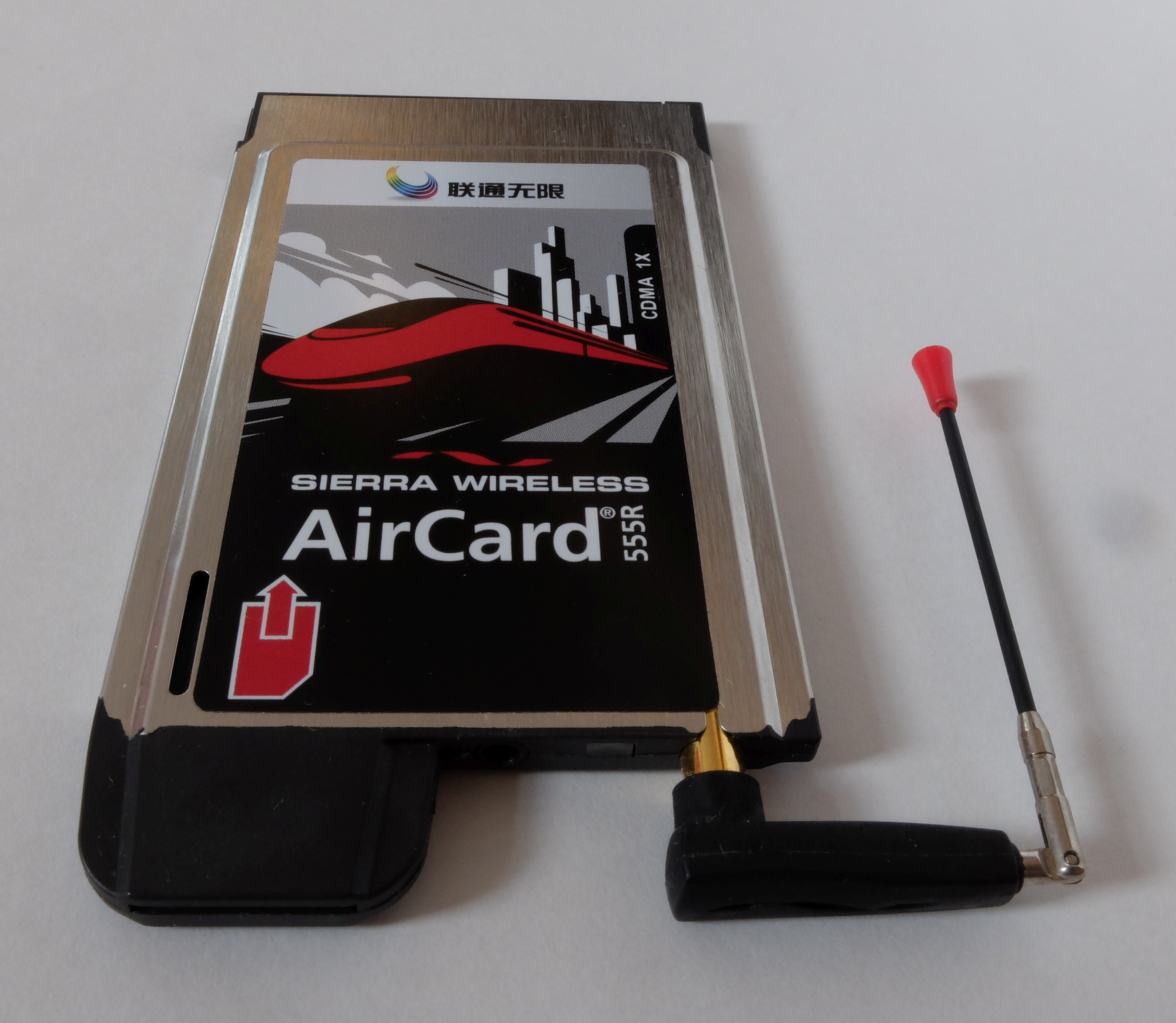
Sierra Wireless AirCard 555R PC Card wireless modem for the China Unicom network with R-UIM interface (extension at the front)

Removable User Identity Module (R-UIM, usually pronounced as "R-yuim") is a card developed for cdmaOne/CDMA2000 ("CDMA") handsets that extends the GSM SIM card to CDMA phones and networks. To work in CDMA networks, the R-UIM contains an early version of the CSIM application. The card also contains SIM (GSM) application, so it can work on both networks. It is physically compatible with GSM SIMs and can fit into existing GSM phones as it is an extension of the GSM 11.11 standard.

This interface brings one of the main advantages of GSM to CDMA network phones. By having a removable identity card, CDMA users can change phones while keeping their phone numbers by simply swapping the cards. This simplifies many situations such as phone upgrades, phone replacements due to damage, or using the same phone on a different provider's CDMA network.

The R-UIM card has been superseded by CSIM on UICC. This technique allows all three applications (SIM, CSIM, and USIM) to coexist on a single smartcard, allowing the card to be used in virtually any phone worldwide that supports smart cards.

The CSIM application, a port of R-UIM functionality to the UICC, is defined in standard.

This form of card is widely used in China under the CDMA service of China Telecom (which was acquired from China Unicom in 2008). However, it is also used elsewhere such as India, Indonesia, Japan, Taiwan, Thailand, and the US.

== See also ==
- CDMA subscriber identity module (CSIM)
- Subscriber identity module (SIM)
- Universal subscriber identity module (USIM)
- W-SIM
- MEID
