= Flying Doctors Nigeria =

Air ambulance service in Nigeria

Flying Doctors Nigeria is an air ambulance service established by Dr Ola Brown.

== Description ==
It has its main office in Lagos and another in Port Harcourt with 20 aircraft and 47 staff, 44 of whom are doctors. As well as moving injured and ill patients to the hospital, the organisation has set up medical infrastructure for the government and worked with private companies to improve their on-site medical services.

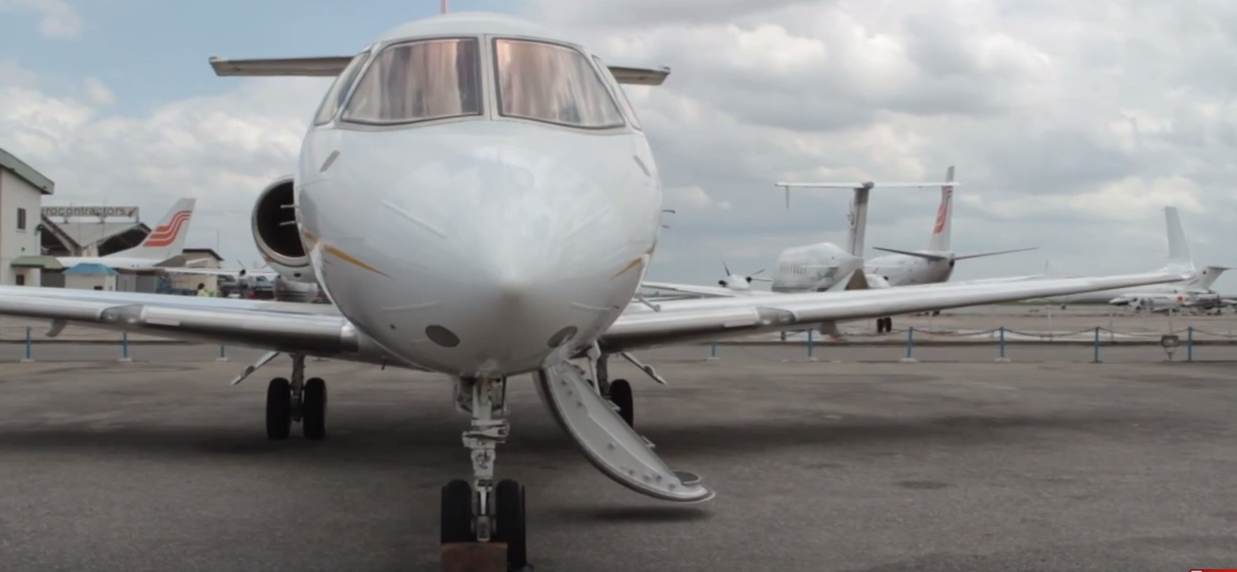
Flying doctor plane

It contracts with the government and private companies. Helicopters are provided for corporate clients running large events, and wealthy families and individuals can set up a membership plan for private emergency healthcare.

The company signed an agreement with a UK-based call centre to operate telephone services to provide stable communications.
