= Testdroid =

Software test automation tool

Testdroid is a set of mobile software development and testing products by Bitbar Technologies Limited.

== Company ==
Bitbar was founded in 2009, with offices in Cambridge, United Kingdom, Wrocław, Poland, and Oulu, Finland. Marko Kaasila is a founder and chief executive officer. Other founders included Sakari Rautiainen and Jouko Kaasila. Initial seed funding came from angel investors and Finnvera Venture Capital in December 2012. By 2013, Bitbar was reported to have offices in San Francisco, Helsinki and in Wrocław. An investment of US$3 million was announced in April 2013, from Creathor Ventures, DFJ Esprit, Finnvera Venture Capital, Finland's TEKES and Qualcomm. Investors were quoted as being attracted because customers already included Google, Facebook, LinkedIn, Flipboard, Pinterest, and eBay.

In May 2014, a research by the company found out several aspects that fragment Android ecosystem for developers and users.

In September 2014, company enabled free access to Intel Atom based Android devices for mobile application and game testers.

== Products ==
Testdroid comprises three different products: Testdroid Cloud, Testdroid Recorder and Testdroid Enterprise. Testdroid provides an application programming interface through open source software available on GitHub. Testdroid can use testing frameworks, such as Robotium, Appium and uiautomator for native and Selenium for web applications, targeted for mobile application and game developers.

Testdroid Cloud contains real Android and iOS powered devices, some of which are available for users. Testdroid Cloud lets users run tests simultaneously on cloud-based service.

Testdroid Recorder is a tool for developers and testers for recording user-actions and producing JUnit based test cases on mobile application and games. Testdroid Recorder is available at the Eclipse marketplace.

Testdroid Enterprise is a server software for managing automated testing on multiple real Android and iOS powered devices, supporting Gradle build system and Jenkins Continuous Integration.

Testdroid appeared at Google I/O in 2012 and 2013.
