= CDMA Certification Forum =

CDMA Certification Forum (known as CCF) was the original official authority governing CDMA Device certification. The CCF was an international partnership between network operator and device vendors to maintain and evolve a core global device certification process that helps improve quality through consistent interoperability, conformance and performance testing across the globe. On 31 December 2014, CCF voted to hand all its certification responsibilities to the Global Certification Forum (GCF).

== History ==
- July 2004: The CDMA Certification Forum was established as a nonprofit 501(c) organization, with the purpose of defining and implementing a core global handset certification process for cellular phones and terminals using CDMA technology.
- October 2006: Washington, DC – CTIA adopts the CCF test plan for CDMA device certification.
- February 2008: Costa Mesa, CA – The CDMA Development Group (CDG) recognizes the CCF as the sole device certification authority and transfers its recommended test guidelines (CDG 1,2,3 and others) to be merged into the CCF test process.
- September 2009: Las Vegas, NV – CTIA CDMA certification is integrated into the CCF certification process as the CTIA Certification Market Endorsement.
- June 2011: Sprint market endorsement is approved for use as part of the CCF Certification Program.
- December 2014: Ceased operational activities.

== Organization ==
The CDMA Certification Forum (CCF) and its members were dedicated to improving the quality and time-to-market of all CDMA devices by using a common test process that ensures that they all conformed to the same quality and performance standards established by the industry participants and standards bodies.

The CCF also addressed the testing and certification of new/emerging technologies such as M2M, applications testing and more. CCF Members were organized in working groups that developed processes that helped vendors and operators to successfully and rapidly get their devices through certification.

The organization consisted of:

- The Board of Directors includes CDMA Vendors and Operators elected by the statutory members on an annual basis.
- The Steering Committee was responsible for day-to-day tactical management of the CCF.
- The Technical Working Group was established with the primary charter of defining, validating, implementing, and evolving device certification test plans.
- The Certification Working Group was established with the primary charter of defining, implementing, and evolving a certification process for CDMA devices, an authorization process for test labs, and a platform validation process for commercial test platforms.

Additional working groups and sub-working groups were established as needed to achieve the objectives set for by the Steering Committee in pursuit of the member agreed upon work items.

The CDMA Certification Forum counted over 40 member companies including CDMA vendors, manufacturers, test labs and testing equipment manufacturers.

== CCF certification process ==
The CCF certification process facilitated the way devices are tested and prepared for commercialization. It reduced the testing time while ensuring high-quality standards and reducing testing costs. Some of the benefits of the CCF certification process included:

- One core test process: using the same test process for all CDMA devices ensures that they all conform to the same quality and performance standards.
- Reduced redundant testing and cost: Because the test results generated meet most operator’s basic needs, vendors can use these results for multiple operators.
- Reduced test time: The efficient streamlined process greatly reduces certification time, and hence shortens time-to-market.

== CDMA Certification Forum activities ==
The activities performed by the CCF included:

- Evolve and maintain existing test plans
- Develop test plans specific to new/emerging technologies
- Reduce test cases in order to decrease certification time and cost to market while maintaining an effective certification program.
- Inform emerging markets about the need for quality products and the possibilities for certification
- Organize members’ face-to-face meeting intended to facilitate discussions among professionals of the industry and investigate the industry upcoming needs in terms of device testing and certification

== See also ==
- Global Certification Forum
