= IP Multimedia Services Identity Module =

Application residing on SIM card

An IP Multimedia Services Identity Module (ISIM) is an application residing on the UICC, an IC card specified in TS 31.101. This module can be used in UMTS 3G and IMS-based VoLTE networks. It stores parameters used to identify and authenticate the user to the IMS. The ISIM application can coexist with both the SIM and the USIM on the same UICC, allowing the same smart card to be used across GSM networks and earlier releases of the UMTS..

Among the data present on ISIM are an IP Multimedia Private Identity (IMPI), the home operator domain name, one or more IP Multimedia Public Identity (IMPU) and a long-term secret used to authenticate and calculate cipher keys. The first IMPU stored in the ISIM is used in emergency registration requests.
