= Electronic serial number =

Serial number depending on the device module

Electronic serial numbers (ESNs) were created by the U.S. Federal Communications Commission (FCC) to uniquely identify mobile devices, from the days of AMPS in the United States starting in the early 1980s. The administrative role was taken over by the Telecommunications Industry Association in 1997 and is still maintained by them. ESNs are currently mainly used with CDMA phones (and were previously used by AMPS and TDMA phones), compared to International Mobile Equipment Identity (IMEI) numbers used by all GSM phones.

The first eight bits of the ESN were originally the manufacturer code, leaving 24 bits for the manufacturer to assign up to 16,777,215 codes to mobiles. To allow more than 256 manufacturers to be identified, the manufacturer code was extended to 14 bits, leaving 18 bits for the manufacturer to assign up to 262,144 codes. Manufacturer code 0x80 is reserved from assignment and is used instead as an eight-bit prefix for pseudo-ESNs (pESN). The remaining 24 bits are the least significant bits of the SHA-1 hash of a mobile equipment identifier (MEID). Pseudo-ESNs are not guaranteed to be unique (the MEID is the unique identifier if the phone has a pseudo-ESN).

ESNs are often represented as either 11-digit decimal numbers or 8-digit hexadecimal numbers. For the decimal format the first three digits are the decimal representation of the first eight bits (between 00 and 255 inclusive) and the next eight digits are derived from the remaining 24 bits and will be between 0000000 and 16777215 inclusive. The decimal format of pseudo ESNs will therefore begin with 128. The decimal format separately displays eight bit manufacturer codes in the first three digits, but 14 bit codes are not displayed as separate digits. The hexadecimal format displays an ESN as eight digits and also does not separately display 14 bit manufacturer codes which occupy 3.5 hexadecimal digits.

As ESNs have essentially run out, a new serial number format, MEID, was created by 3GPP2 and was first implemented by Verizon in 2006. MEIDs are 56 bits long, the same length as the IMEI and, in fact, MEID was created to be a superset of IMEI. The main difference between MEID and IMEI is that the MEID allows hexadecimal digits while IMEI allows only decimal digits – "IMEI shall consist of decimal digits (0 through 9) only".

The last of the previously unused ESN codes were allocated in November 2008. Applications for assignments were accepted until June 30, 2010 using reclaimed ESN codes, those previously assigned to AMPS or TDMA phones and therefore not present on CDMA2000 systems. Reclaimed codes have also been used for UIMID assignments. Codes are assigned according to industry guidelines.

Although ESN assignments may still occur in the future based on applications received before June 30, 2010, there have not been any assignments made since December 31, 2010.
