= SIM Application Toolkit =

Mobile telecommunications standard

SIM Application Toolkit (STK) is a standard of the GSM system which enables the subscriber identity module (SIM card) to initiate actions which can be used for various value-added services. Similar standards exist for other network and card systems, with the USIM Application Toolkit (USAT) for USIMs used by newer-generation networks being an example. A more general name for this class of Java Card-based applications running on UICC cards is the Card Application Toolkit (CAT).

The SIM Application Toolkit consists of a set of commands programmed into the SIM which define how the SIM should interact directly with the outside world and initiates commands independently of the handset and the network. This enables the SIM to build up an interactive exchange between a network application and the end user and access, or control access to, the network. The SIM also gives commands to the handset such as displaying menus and/or asking for user input.

STK has been deployed by many mobile operators around the world for many applications, often where a menu-based approach is required, such as Mobile Banking and content browsing. Designed as a single application environment, the STK can be started during the initial power up of the SIM card and is especially suited to low level applications with simple user interfaces.

In GSM networks, the SIM Application Toolkit is defined by the GSM 11.14 standard released in 2001. From release 4 onwards, GSM 11.14 was replaced by 3GPP TS 31.111 which also includes the specifications of the USIM Application Toolkit for 3/4G networks.

== Advantages ==
- Some manufacturers claim that STK enables higher levels of security through identity verification and encryption, which are necessary for secure electronic commerce.
- STK has been deployed on the largest number of mobile devices.

== Limitations ==
Updating Android software is done over GSM where the SIM Toolkit may install automatically with new software regardless of automatic install applications.

Change in applications and menus stored on the SIM is difficult after the customer takes delivery of the SIM and sometimes may be recognized as surveillance software.

To deliver updates, either the SIM must be returned and exchanged for a new one (which can be costly and inconvenient) or the application updates must be delivered over-the-air (OTA) using specialized, optional SIM features. As of October 2010, mobile network operators can, for example, deliver updated STK application menus by sending a secure SMS to handsets that include a Toolbox (S@T) compliant wireless internet browser (WIB). When using a SIM card compliant to the BIP (Bearer Independent protocol) in a BIP-compliant handset, the updates can be delivered very quickly as well (depending upon the network connectivity available to and supported by the handset, i.e. GPRS/3G speed). It might also be possible to change the menu of STK applications based on the Wireless Internet Gateway (WIG) specification. The update limitations hinder the number and frequency of STK application deployments.

STK has essentially no support for multimedia, only basic pictures.

The STK technology has limited independent development support available.

If a mobile phone does not support SIM Application Toolkit, users may not be able to use the service or network correctly. Issues with several mobile network operators have been noticed on smartphones that don't support STK, like Nokia N900.

== In newer networks ==
USIM Application Toolkit (USAT) is the equivalent of STK for 3G networks. USAT takes advantage of the multiapplication environment of 3G devices by not activating until a specific application has been selected, unlike STK which is activated at startup. Some functions are card related rather than application related.

== See also ==
- Unstructured Supplementary Service Data (USSD)
- M-Pesa
