= Robotium =

Robotium is an open-source test framework for writing automatic gray box testing cases for Android applications. With the support of Robotium, test case developers can write function, system and acceptance test scenarios, spanning multiple Android activities. Robotium can be used both for testing applications where the source code is available and applications where only the APK file is available and the implementation details are not known.

The framework is released under Apache License 2.0. Its founder and main developer is Renas Reda. Version 5.0.1 was released on January 5, 2014.

Robotium is similar to Selenium, but for Android. It has support for Android features such as activities, toasts, menus and context menus.

== See also ==
- Android (operating system)
- Selenium (software)
- List of Android devices
- List of Android OS-related topics
