= PTCRB =

Certification forum

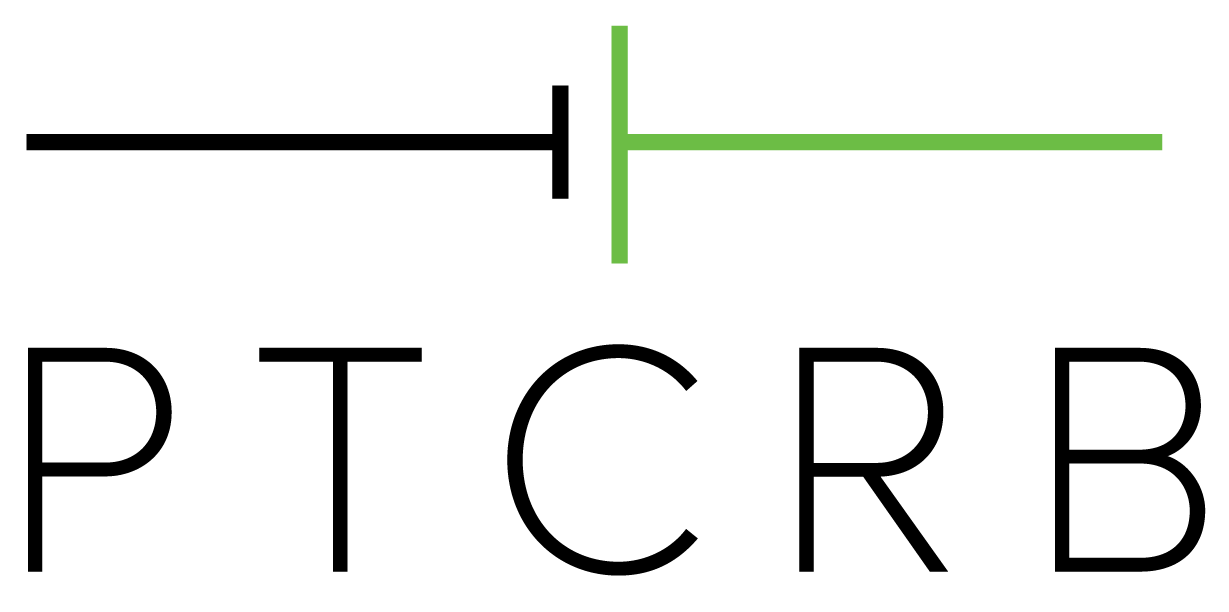
- Formation: 1997
- Purpose: Certification of Wireless Devices
- Members: By Application
- WG Vice Chair: Darren Thompson
- WG Secretary: Graham Harvey
- Website: www.ptcrb.com

The PTCRB was established in 1997 as the certification forum by select North American cellular operators. Now a pseudo-acronym, it no longer stands for its original meaning of the PCS Type Certification Review Board (then named after the GSM1900 MHz band in North America).

The purpose of the PTCRB is to provide the framework within which device certification can take place for members of the PTCRB. This includes, but is not limited to, determination of the test specifications and methods necessary to support the certification process for 5G NR and 4G LTE wireless devices. This group will also be responsible to generate input regarding testing of devices to standards development organizations.

== Certified device types ==
PTCRB operates a certification program for Smartphones, feature phones, tablets, Internet of Things (IoT) devices, notebook computers and modules.

== Certification standards ==
PTCRB certification is based on standards developed by 3rd Generation Partnership Project (3GPP), Open Mobile Alliance (OMA) and other standards-developing organizations (SDOs) recognized by the PTCRB. In some cases, PTCRB certification may accommodate North American standards and additional requirements from the U.S. Federal Communications Commission (FCC), Innovation, Science and Economic Development Canada (ISED) or any other government agency that may have jurisdiction and/or competence in the matter. The Plenary meetings on a quarterly 'PTCRB Super Week' publish their updated North America Permanent Reference document NAPRD03 and PTCRB Program Management Document (PPMD). The PTCRB Editorial Chair is David Trevayne-Smith of Eurofins E&E.

By obtaining PTCRB Certification on a mobile device, it ensures compliance with cellular network standards within the PTCRB Operators' networks. Consequently, PTCRB Operators may block devices from their network, if they are not PTCRB certified.

The CTIA – The Wireless Association has been assigned as the administrator for the PTCRB Certification process and is also responsible for the administration of PTCRB issued IMEIs.

The PTCRB Validation Group (PVG) is a group of test laboratory organizations working in the field of PTCRB associated technologies. The PVG group meets on a regular basis to discuss technical issues and the resolution of problems in a harmonized way. PVG works on open PTCRB Operators Requests for Tests (RfTs) and the validation of Test Platforms and Test Cases for the relevant PTCRB operating frequencies. Full and Observer membership categories reflect the status and scopes of organizations working within the group. The Chair of the PVG is held by Muharrem Gedikoglu of Cetecom and Graham Harvey of Sporton as Vice Chair.

The PTCRB Marketing Working Group Co-Chairs are Johee Chang of Sporton and Amber Neves of Rohde & Schwarz. The Working Group meets regularly to produce marketing materials to assist manufacturers understanding of the process for certification and supporting Test Laboratories along with supporting the CTIA in attendance and support materials for exhibitions.

Some Mobile Network Operators may require further certification before a device is allowed to be placed on a network.

== See also ==
- CTIA – The Wireless Association
- CTIA - IoT Network Certified
- Federal Communications Commission
- Global Certification Forum
- IMEI
