= W-SIM =

Combined SIM card and cellular phone developed by Willcom

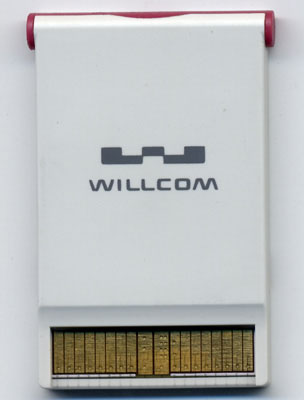
W-SIM （RX420AL）

W-SIM (Willcom-SIM) is a SIM card developed by Willcom which, in addition to standard SIM functions, also has the core components of a cellular telephone (PHS), such as the radio receiver/transmitter, built inside. It is currently used in some terminals (listed below), which do not have radio modules.

The W-SIM core module is an extended version of a SIM card, containing not only user data but also all the transmission technology needed for a mobile device to work.

A terminal device developer can build a customized terminal without the design and development of a radio module, and users can change to a different radio module W-SIM without changing the terminal itself.

Similar to traditional handsets made by WILLCOM, W-SIM terminals can be used in Japan, including global roaming with Taiwan and Thailand. For Mainland China, China Netcom had W-SIMs available, though its PHS network is due to be phased out this year. In addition, a GSM version called the CM-G100 had been developed for use in other countries.

== WILLCOM branded terminals ==
- WS001IN / "TT"
  Hand-set terminal by Net Index.
- WS002IN / "DD"
  Data communication terminal by Net Index.
- WS003SH / W-ZERO3
  Hand-set terminal(smartphone) by Sharp.
- WS004SH / W-ZERO3
  Hand-set terminal(smartphone) by Sharp. Higher-spec version of WS003SH.
- WS005IN / nico.
  Hand-set terminal by Net Index.
- WS007SH / W-ZERO3 [es]
  Hand-set terminal(smartphone) by Sharp. Stylish and slender version of W-ZERO3.
- WS008HA / WS008HA
  ExpressCard data communication terminal by Hagiwara Sys-Com.
- WS009KE / 9(nine)
  Hand-set terminal by KES.

== Terminals branded by other than WILLCOM ==
- Kids Ke-tai papipo!
  Hand-set terminal by Bandai. The internal code is WS006.
