= Global Certification Forum =

Mobile device company partnership

The Global Certification Forum, known as GCF, is a London-based partnership between mobile network operators, mobile device manufacturers and the test industry. GCF was founded in 1999, and its membership has been responsible for creating an independent certification programme to help ensure global interoperability between mobile devices and networks.

The GCF certification process is based on technical requirements as specified within dedicated test specifications provided by the 3GPP, 3GPP2, OMA, IMTC, the GSM Association and others. The current GCF membership includes mobile network operators, more than 40 leading terminal manufacturers and over 65 test equipment manufacturers, test laboratories and other organizations from mainly a test environment.

== Recognized Test Organizations ==
Recognised Test Organisations (RTO) are GCF Members that have demonstrated they possess the experience, qualifications and systems to assess mobile phones and wireless devices against GCF's Certification Criteria.

The Conformance and Field Trial RTOs are organisations to ensure quality compliance for devices per technical standards (e.g. 3GPP) and in industry guidelines for live networks (e.g. GSMA TS.11), respectively. A GCF-certified device is far more likely to perform its best as it would be configured to fit the "DNA" of the network connected and have resolved any issue before its product launch. Therefore, GCF certification enhances the commercial success of a model as well as its brand owner in the competitive mobile market.

From 1 January 2013, it became a requirement that all device testing associated with GCF Certification must be undertaken by an RTO. The scheme recognises Test Organisations in three distinct disciplines: Conformance Testing, Field Trials and Interoperability Testing. To become an RTO, an organisation must submit a declaration confirming that it understands GCF procedures and has the ability to conduct testing in accordance with GCF rules and the relevant RTO requirements.

From 1 January 2015, GCF took over all certification activities previously handled by the CDMA Certification Forum (CCF). The current CEO is Lars Nielsen.

== See also ==
- Federal Communications Commission
- PTCRB, which provides the framework for GSM Mobile Equipment (ME) Type Certification in North America.
