= KDDI (disambiguation) =

KDDI is a Japanese telecommunications operator.

KDDI may also refer to:

- KDDI Mobile, a former mobile phone service operated in the United States
- KDDI India Private Limited, an Indian subsidiary of KDDI
- KDDI Designing Studio, a consumer showroom in Harajuku
