= Kyocera Urbano V02 =

2015 smartphone model

URBANO V02
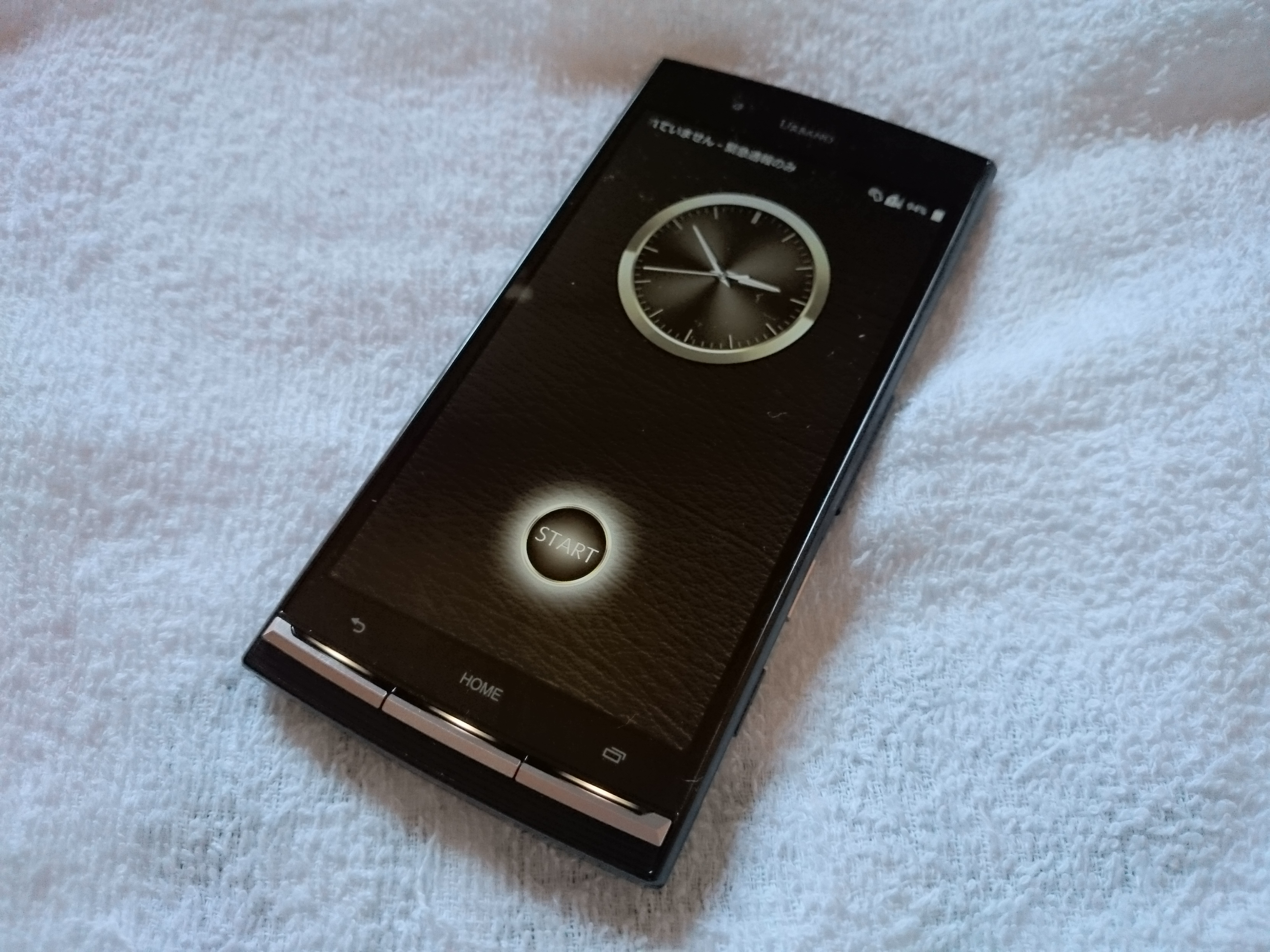
- Mocha Black front (keys lit)
- Brand: au
- Manufacturer: Kyocera
- Type: Smartphone
- Series: URBANO
- First released: July 18, 2015; 11 years ago
- Predecessor: URBANO V01
- Compatible networks: 3.9G: FDD-LTE (au VoLTE) (700 MHz / N800 MHz / 2 GHz); 3G: W-CDMA (850 MHz / 2 GHz); 2G: GSM (1.9 GHz / 1.8 GHz / 900 MHz); Data: LTE-Advanced (au 4G LTE CA), WiMAX 2.1, Wi-Fi (802.11a/b/g/n/ac)
- Form factor: Slate
- Colors: Mocha Black; Deep Green; Twinkle Pink
- Dimensions: 146 mm (5.7 in) H 72 mm (2.8 in) W 8.6 mm (0.34 in) D
- Weight: 138 g (4.9 oz)
- Operating system: Android 5.1 "Lollipop"
- System-on-chip: Qualcomm Snapdragon 400 MSM8928
- CPU: 1.4 GHz quad-core
- Memory: 2 GB RAM
- Storage: 16 GB ROM
- Removable storage: microSDHC (up to 32 GB), microSDXC (up to 128 GB)
- Battery: 2,200 mAh (non-removable)
- Charging: Approx. 140 minutes (using desktop holder)
- Rear camera: 13.0 MP CMOS, multi-point autofocus, Full HD video recording
- Front camera: 5.0 MP CMOS, face detection AF, HD video recording
- Display: 5.0 in (130 mm) IPS TFT LCD, 720p HD (1280 × 720 pixels), ~16.77M colors
- Model: KYV34
- Made in: Japan

URBANO V02 is a 3.9G (au 4G LTE/au VoLTE) and 4G (au 4G LTE CA/WiMAX 2+) compatible smartphone developed and released on July 18, 2015 for the Japanese market by Kyocera for KDDI and Okinawa Cellular Telephone under the au brand. Its model number designation is KYV34.

It features a 5.0-inch TFT display with a resolution of 1280 x 720 pixels, protected by high-strength Dragontrail X cover glass. The storage can be expanded using a microSDXC card up to a maximum capacity of 128 GB.

The primary rear camera has an effective resolution of 13 megapixels integrated by "AINOS Engine" image processing system and the front-facing camera has a resolution of approximately 5 megapixels. The device is powered by a 2200 mAh capacity battery.

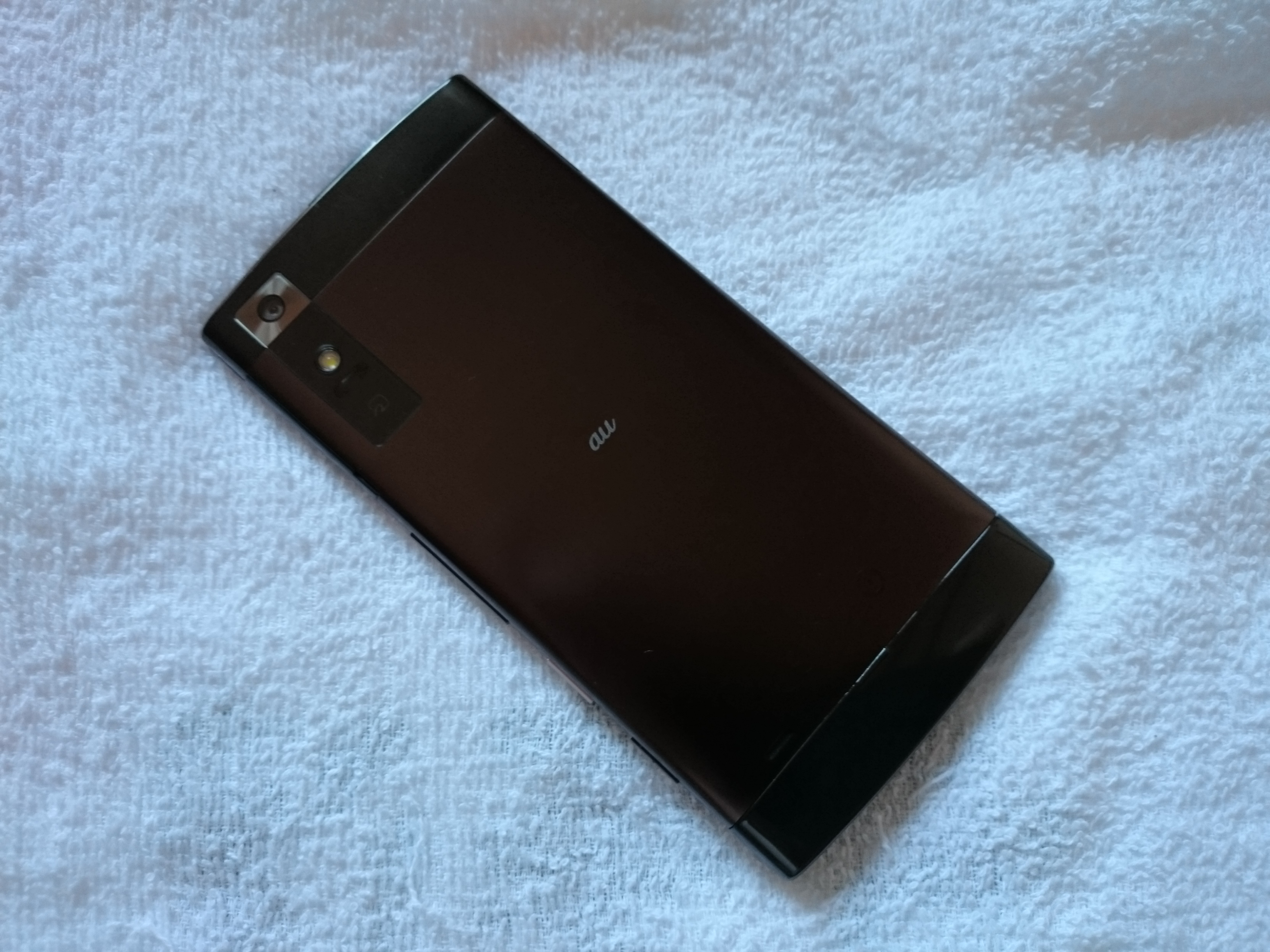
Rear view

It supports 4G LTE (with maximum download speeds of 150 Mbps), WiMAX 2+ (with maximum download speeds of 110 Mbps), VoLTE, Wi-Fi tethering, NFC, infrared communication, Osaifu-Keitai, Emergency Bulletin Mail, and Safety Information System services.
