= Fujitsu Arrows Z ISW13F =

Slate-format smartphone by Fujitsu

ARROWS Z ISW13F
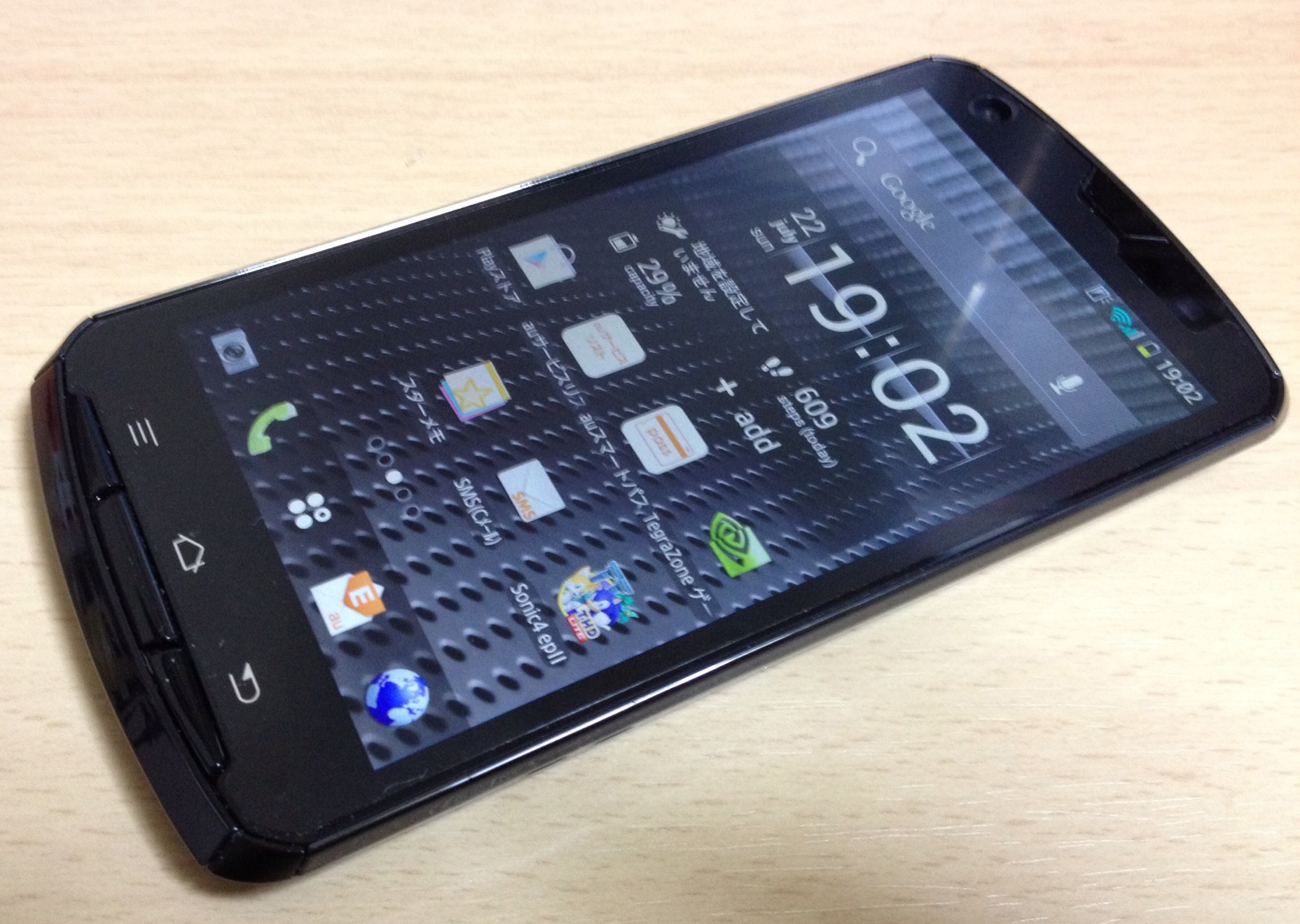
- Front and back views of the ARROWS Z ISW13F
- Brand: au
- Manufacturer: Fujitsu Mobile Communications
- Series: IS series
- First released: July 20, 2012
- Discontinued: March 31, 2022; 4 years ago
- Compatible networks: 3G: CDMA2000 1xMC (800 MHz/2 GHz); 2G: GSM
- Form factor: Slate
- Colors: Glossy Red; Cool Black
- Dimensions: 135 mm (5.3 in) H 67 mm (2.6 in) W 10.6 mm (0.42 in) D
- Weight: 143 g (5.0 oz)
- Operating system: Android 4.0
- System-on-chip: NVIDIA Tegra 3 AP33
- CPU: 1.5 GHz quad-core
- Memory: 1 GB RAM
- Storage: 16 GB
- Removable storage: microSD (up to 2 GB), microSDHC (up to 32 GB)
- Battery: 1800 mAh
- Rear camera: 13.1 MP back-illuminated CMOS, autofocus, image stabilization, Full HD video recording
- Front camera: 1.3 MP CMOS
- Display: 4.6 in (120 mm) HD TFT LCD, 1280x720 pixels (16.77 million colors)
- Water resistance: IPX5/IPX8
- Model: FJI13

The ARROWS Z ISW13F (model number FJI13) is a slate-format smartphone manufactured for the Japanese market by Fujitsu Mobile Communications (now FCNT) for the IS series on the au brand, operated by KDDI and Okinawa Cellular Telephone. It supports CDMA 1X WIN (later au 3G) and +WiMAX.

== History ==
- May 15, 2012 – Officially announced by KDDI and Fujitsu Mobile Communications.
- June 14, 2012 – Passed certification by the Federal Communications Commission (FCC).
- July 20, 2012 – Released early in the Kanto, Hokuriku, and Shikoku regions.
- July 21, 2012 – Released in the Hokkaido, Tohoku, Chubu, Kansai, Chugoku, and Kyushu regions.
- July 25, 2012 – Released in the Okinawa region.
- March 31, 2022 – With the total shutdown and termination of the carrier's 3G service, the device became completely unusable except when connected to Wi-Fi.

== Specifications ==
Rear panel view

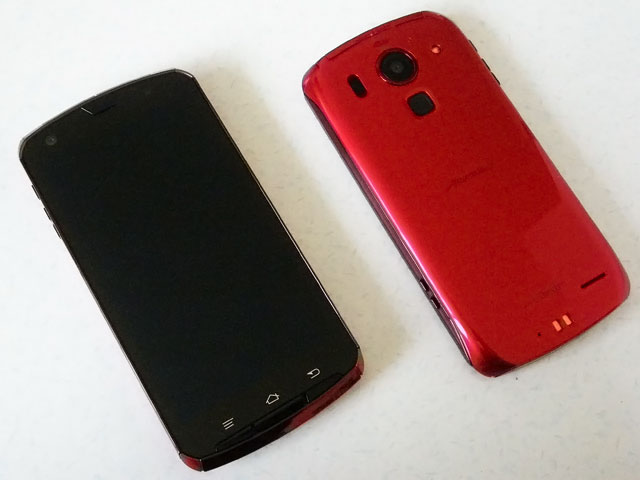
The device in Glossy Red coloway

The ARROWS Z ISW13F is the successor to the ISW11F and represents the first au device released following Toshiba's departure from the joint venture. It is the first Japanese domestic smartphone equipped with an NVIDIA Tegra 3 quad-core processor running at 1.5 GHz.

The system-on-chip features a "5th battery-saver core"—a 400 MHz companion core designed to operate with lower power consumption during light tasks such as standby, settings navigation, voice calls, and text input, allowing it to achieve lower overall power consumption than single-core or dual-core processors. The processor integrates a 12-core NVIDIA GeForce GPU to handle 3D graphics for high-resolution gaming.

The hardware includes 1 GB of RAM and 16 GB of internal storage, expandable via microSD (up to 2 GB) or microSDHC (up to 32 GB) cards. The 4.6-inch HD TFT LCD display has a resolution of 1280x720 pixels supporting 16.77 million colors.

The rear camera uses a 13.1-megapixel back-illuminated Sony "Exmor R for mobile" CMOS sensor paired with Fujitsu Semiconductor's "Milbeaut Mobile" image processing engine, supporting autofocus, image stabilization, and Full HD (1920x1080) video recording. The front camera uses a 1.3-megapixel CMOS sensor.

The device is powered by a removable 1800 mAh battery (model FJI13UAA) and includes protective features common to the ARROWS series that automatically apply functional restrictions in the event of excessive heat generation. It meets IPX5 and IPX8 ratings for water and dust resistance. Additional features include Osaifu-Keitai (FeliCa e-wallet), IrSimple infrared communication, 1seg TV tuning, Beats Audio, Wi-Fi (IEEE 802.11a/b/g/n), and Bluetooth 4.0.

For display output, the MicroUSB port utilizes MHL instead of the MicroHDMI port used on its predecessor, requiring an MHL adapter cable for HDMI output. Because all subsequent au smartphones starting with the iPhone 5 in September 2012 transitioned to LTE (au 4G LTE), this model was the final +WiMAX-compatible smartphone offered by au, as well as the final joint launch in the IS series alongside the IS17SH.

The device launched with Android 4.0 Ice Cream Sandwich. It includes pre-installed input software in the form of ATOK for ISW13F with handwriting recognition support.

== Known issues ==
- A bug present at launch caused the device to slow down, exhibit flashing home screen icons, and reboot approximately 5 minutes after powering on; this was resolved via a software update on August 9, 2012.
- Occasional failure to unlock using the fingerprint sensor was corrected in the August 9, 2012 update.
- Failure to establish Wi-Fi connection when entering sleep mode at the start of a connection attempt was fixed in the August 9, 2012 update.
- An issue where the screen failed to turn off automatically was addressed in a software update on August 30, 2012.
- Intermittent loss of data communication during handoff from WiMAX to 3G networks was resolved in the August 30, 2012 update.
- Degraded Wi-Fi tethering communication speeds were fixed in the August 30, 2012 update.
- Unintended reboots occurring while the screen was turned off were fixed in a software update on October 29, 2013.
