= BASIO KYV32 =

2015 smartphone model

- Brand: au
- Manufacturer: Kyocera
- Type: Smartphone
- Series: Kantan Keitai
- First released: February 13, 2015 (Red color variant: January 29, 2016)
- Predecessor: Kantan Keitai K012 (KY012)
- Successor: Kantan Keitai KYF32, BASIO2 SHV36
- Compatible networks: 3.9G: FDD-LTE (au VoLTE) (N800 MHz/2 GHz); 3G: W-CDMA (850 MHz/2 GHz); 2G: GSM (1.9 GHz/1.8 GHz/900 MHz)
- Form factor: Bar (Waterproof, dustproof, and shockproof)
- Colors: Gold; Pink; Blue; Red
- Dimensions: 142 mm (5.6 in) H 70 mm (2.8 in) W 10.4 mm (0.41 in) D
- Weight: 152 g (5.4 oz)
- Operating system: Android 4.4.4
- CPU: 2.3 GHz quad-core Qualcomm Snapdragon 801 (MSM8974AB)
- Memory: 2 GB RAM
- Storage: 16 GB ROM
- Removable storage: microSDHC (up to 32 GB), microSDXC (up to 128 GB) (officially supported by KDDI); *Use of microSD cards 2 GB or lower, or Class 2 or lower transfer rate cards is not recommended.
- Battery: 3,000 mAh (non-removable)
- Charging: Approx. 120 minutes
- Rear camera: Approx. 13 megapixels, CMOS image sensor with face detection autofocus
- Front camera: Approx. 970,000 pixels, CMOS image sensor (Exmor R for mobile)
- Display: 5.0-inch TFT LCD, FHD (1920 × 1080 pixels), approx. 16.77 million colors
- Water resistance: Yes
- Model: KYV32
- Made in: Japan
- Other: 1. LTE supports carrier aggregation 2. Charging desktop stand (cradle) included as an accessory 3. SAR value: 0.770 W/kg (head), 0.674 W/kg (body)
- Website: https://www.kyocera.co.jp/prdct/telecom/consumer/lineup/kyv32/

The BASIO KYV32 is an entry-level smartphone developed and manufactured by Kyocera for the Japanese domestic market. It was released for KDDI and Okinawa Cellular Telephone Company under the au brand, featuring support for 3.9G (au 4G LTE / au VoLTE) and 4G (au 4G LTE CA / WiMAX 2+) mobile communication systems. It belongs to the Kantan Keitai series of senior-oriented devices.

== Spefications ==
This senior-oriented smartphone features a 5.0-inch Full HD display with a resolution of 1920×1080 pixels. To accommodate elderly users, the home screen is optimized for high visibility with careful adjustments to text size and color contrast.

The hardware design incorporates physical buttons dedicated exclusively to basic phone and email functions. Additionally, the user interface includes a prominent shortcut icon that directly connects users to the au Customer Center, providing accessible technical support for first-time smartphone owners.

=== Connectivity ===
For voice communication, the handset utilizes the "Smart Sonic Receiver"—a proprietary Kyocera technology specifically tuned for high-quality "au VoLTE" calls, integrated with "Slow Calling" function that stretches the audio during natural pauses to reduce the apparent speed of the speaker's voice and an "Audio Adjustment" feature allows users to customize the audio profile mid-call to ensure optimal clarity.

=== Smart Sonic Receiver ===
The BASIO smartphone integrates proprietary "Smart Sonic Receiver" technology, which addresses a common user concern regarding the ambiguous earpiece placement on modern smartphones compared to traditional feature phones. By vibrating the entire display assembly to transmit audio, the technology allows users to hear clear calls regardless of where they place their ear against the screen. Furthermore, the inclusion of au VoLTE expands the device's supported frequency bands, enhancing overall voice call quality.
