= Aquos K SHF32 =

Japan-exclusive Android flip phone

AQUOS K SHF32
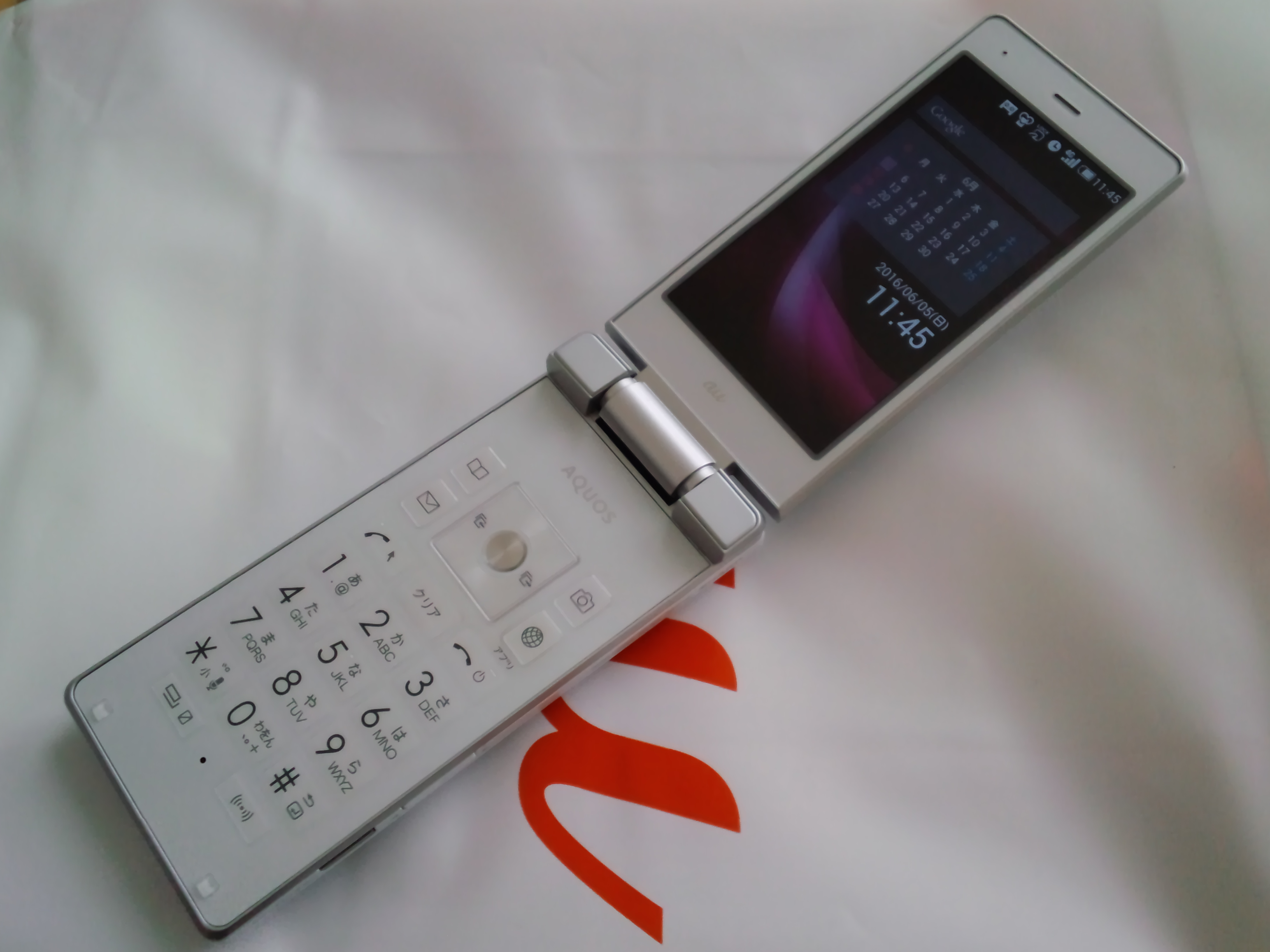
- SHF32 Clear White
- Brand: au
- Manufacturer: Sharp Corporation
- Type: Feature phone (Garaho)
- First released: July 17, 2015; 11 years ago
- Predecessor: AQUOS K SHF31
- Compatible networks: 3.9G FDD-LTE (au VoLTE) (800 MHz / 2 GHz); 3G: W-CDMA (850 MHz / 2 GHz); 2G: GSM (1.9 GHz / 1.8 GHz / 900 MHz)
- Form factor: Clamshell
- Colors: Amber; Clear White; Bordeaux
- Dimensions: 113 mm (4.4 in) H 51 mm (2.0 in) W 16.9 mm (0.67 in) D
- Weight: 128 g (4.5 oz)
- Operating system: Android 4.4
- System-on-chip: Qualcomm Snapdragon 400 MSM8926
- CPU: 1.2 GHz quad-core
- Memory: 1 GB RAM
- Storage: 8 GB ROM
- Removable storage: microSDHC (up to 32 GB)
- SIM: au Nano IC Card 04 (VoLTE)
- Battery: 1,410 mAh (removable)
- Rear camera: 13.1 MP CMOS
- Front camera: None
- Display: 3.4 in (86 mm) qHD (960×540 pixels) TFT LCD, 16.77M colors Sub-display: 0.9 in (23 mm) OLED (monochrome)
- Water resistance: Waterproof
- Model: SHF32
- Made in: China

The AQUOS K SHF32 is a 3.9G mobile phone (au 4G LTE/au VoLTE) feature phone (commonly known as a "Garaho") developed by Sharp Corporation for the Japanese domestic market, distributed under the au brand by KDDI and Okinawa Cellular Telephone.

The AQUOS K SHF32 is a minor update to the previous SHF31 model, featuring new support for voice calls over LTE (au VoLTE). Due to the addition of VoLTE support, voice calls over the 3G (CDMA2000 1xRTT) network and data communications via 1xEV-DO are no longer supported on this device in Japan. Existing users upgrading to this model are required to replace their SIM card with an au Nano IC Card 04 (VoLTE). While prototype units received technical compliance certification for 5 GHz Wi-Fi and WiMAX 2+ prior to launch, these features were disabled and are unsupported in the official commercial release.

== History ==
On May 14, 2015, KDDI and Sharp officially announced the device. On July 17, 2015, the phone was released simultaneously nationwide across Japan.

== Specifications ==
=== Hardware ===
Folded, rear side

The phone is powered by a quad-core Qualcomm Snapdragon 400 (MSM8926) processor clocked at 1.2 GHz, paired with 1 GB of RAM and 8 GB of internal ROM storage. Expandable storage is available through microSDHC cards up to 32 GB. It features a main 3.4-inch qHD TFT LCD display capable of showing 16.77 million colors, as well as a 0.9-inch monochrome OLED sub-display on the outer shell.

For imagery, it includes a 13.1-megapixel rear CMOS main camera with an aperture of f/2.2, but lacks a front-facing camera. Connectivity options include 3.9G FDD-LTE, IEEE 802.11b/g/n Wi-Fi (2.4 GHz), Bluetooth 4.0, infrared port, and tethering support for up to 10 devices. Additional hardware capabilities include 1Seg TV reception, FeliCa (Osaifu-Keitai), a 6-axis motion sensor, GPS, and waterproof construction. It is powered by a removable 1,410 mAh battery (compatible with the SHF31 battery pack) providing approximately 660 minutes of continuous talk time and 430 hours of LTE standby time.

=== Software ===
The device runs on an operating system based on Android 4.4. It comes preloaded with standard PC web browsing capabilities, input software (iWnn), and various Japanese operator utilities including au ID Settings, au Navi Walk, au Wi-Fi Connection Tool, GLOBAL PASSPORT, au Disaster Countermeasures, Secure Access for 4G LTE feature phones, au Backup, and MobiSystems OfficeSuite. Traditional mobile-formatted web content (EZweb) and Google Play services are not supported.

== See also ==
- Sharp Corporation
- AQUOS K SHF31 – Predecessor model. An Android-based feature phone that did not support au VoLTE or SIM unlocking.
