= Isai V30+ LGV35 =

2017 smartphone model

isai V30+ LGV35
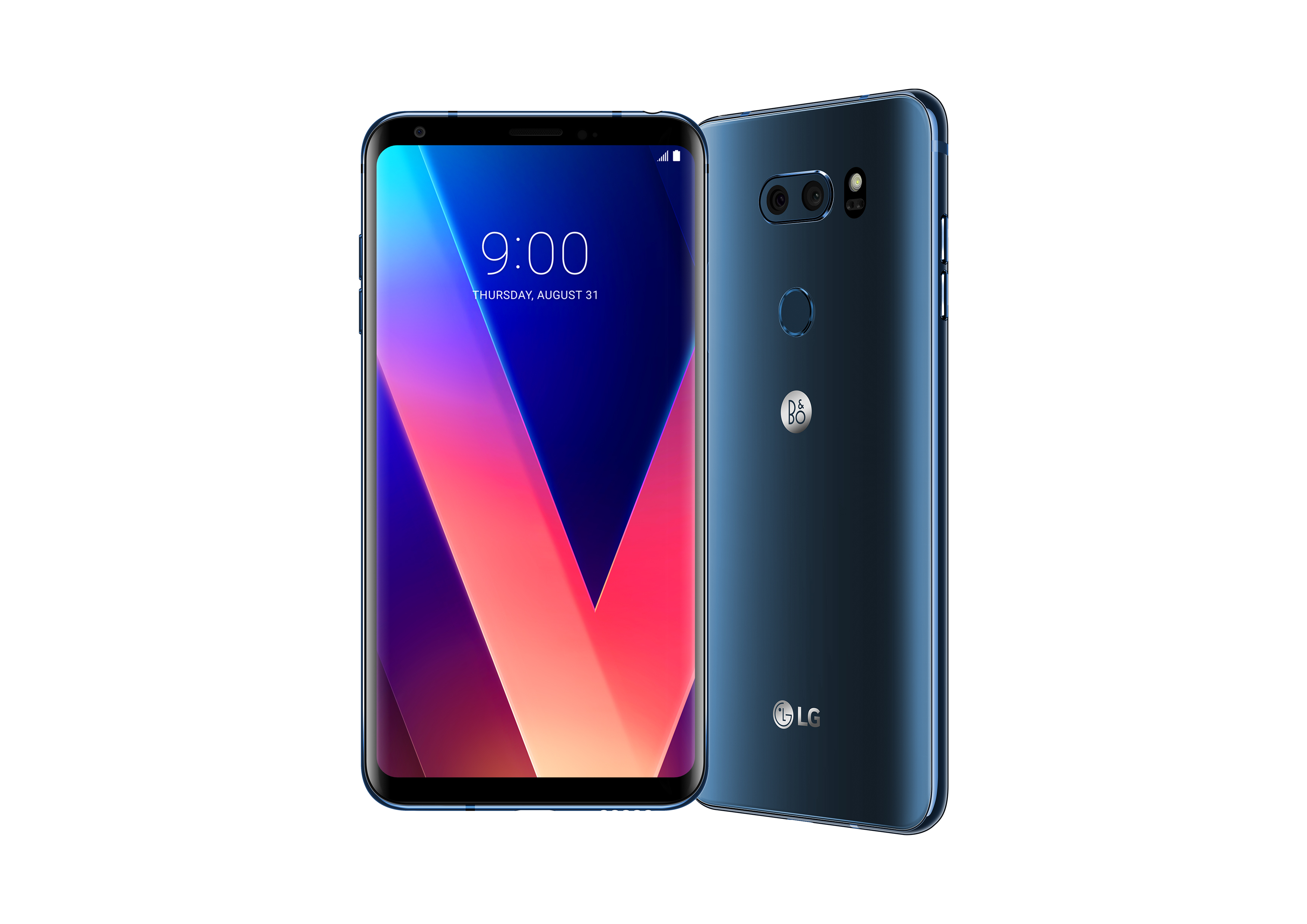
- The V30 global model. (For the au variant, the LG logo on the back is replaced with the B&O PLAY logo, an au logo is placed to the left of the camera, and an isai logo is added to the center.)
- Brand: au
- Manufacturer: LG Electronics
- First released: December 22, 2017
- Availability by region: Japan only
- Compatible networks: 3.9G: FDD-LTE (au VoLTE) (700 MHz / N800 MHz / 2 GHz); 3G: W-CDMA (850 MHz / 2 GHz); 2G: GSM (1.9 GHz / 1.8 GHz / 900 MHz)
- Form factor: Phablet
- Colors: Cloud Silver; Aurora Black; Moroccan Blue
- Dimensions: 152×75×7.4 mm (5.98×2.95×0.29 in)
- Weight: 158 g (6 oz)
- Operating system: Android 8.0 → 9.0
- CPU: Qualcomm Snapdragon 835 (MSM8998); 2.45 GHz + 1.9 GHz (Octa-core)
- Memory: 4 GB RAM
- Storage: 128 GB
- Removable storage: microSD (up to 2 GB) microSDHC (up to 32 GB) microSDXC (up to 256 GB)
- Battery: 3,300 mAh
- Charging: Approx. 110 minutes Approx. 120 minutes
- Rear camera: Approx. 16.5 MP / Approx. 13.1 MP back-illuminated CMOS (Dual Camera, image stabilization for video, face recognition, Laser AF, dual flash, Cine Video)
- Front camera: Approx. 5.1 MP CMOS
- Display: 6.0-inch OLED, WQHD+ (1440 × 2880 pixels), approx. 16.77 million colors
- Sound: 1Seg / Fullseg
- Connectivity: 3.9G/4G: FDD-LTE / LTE-Advanced (au 4G LTE / au 4G LTE CA) (700 MHz / N800 MHz / 2 GHz), WiMAX 2.1 (WiMAX 2+); 3.5G: UMTS (W-CDMA); Other: Wireless LAN (IEEE 802.11a/b/g/n/ac 5 GHz / 2.4 GHz); Bluetooth 5.0
- Data inputs: iWnn
- Other: USB Type-C, 3.5 mm headset jack, tethering, FeliCa / NFC touchpad

The isai V30+ LGV35 is a smartphone manufactured by South Korea's LG Electronics for the Japanese market. It is compatible with the 3.9G (au 4G LTE / au VoLTE) and 4G (au 4G LTE CA / WiMAX 2+) mobile communication systems operated by KDDI and Okinawa Cellular Telephone Company under the au brand.

On October 21, 2017, Japanese telecommunications operators KDDI and Okinawa Cellular Telephone Company jointly hosted a press conference in Tokyo titled "au HOME Presentation with au 2017 Winter Model." During the event, the companies officially unveiled their "2017 Winter Model" product lineup, which included the premium flagship smartphone, the isai V30+. The high-end device was scheduled for release in the winter season of that year.

== Overview & specifications ==
The successor to the LGV34, this handset is a localized version of the global LG V30 model tailored for Japan. Although it carries the "isai" branding, it also falls under the LG V series lineage. Compared to its predecessor, the screen size has increased, and it includes support for Google's Daydream virtual reality platform. While previous models utilized IPS LCDs, the J-SH03 utilizes an OLED panel, marking a return to the display technology for the series since the LGL23. Video recording performance has been significantly upgraded with the inclusion of the "Cine Video" suite, designed to produce cinematic effects.

It also features a "Point Zoom" functionality that enables smoother focal adjustments by smoothly centering and zooming onto whichever area of the display the user touches. On the audio front, the tuning remains supervised by Bang & Olufsen, with newly added support for playback of the MQA audio format. Among its other utilities, it is the first device in the isai lineup to offer shock resistance verified to the MIL-STD 810G standard.

While not explicitly highlighted in initial promotions, the device also includes built-in support for Qi wireless charging and is capable of reading Japanese Individual Number Cards (My Number Cards).

It features a 6.0-inch "FullVision" organic light-emitting diode (OLED) screen. The display boasted a QHD+ resolution of 1440 × 2880 pixels, yielding a sharp pixel density of approximately 538 pixels per inch (ppi).

In addition to its standard display capabilities, the device features native compatibility with Daydream, Google's virtual reality platform. This integration enables users to immerse themselves in a wide array of interactive media, including panoramic sports broadcasts, immersive gaming experiences, cinematic releases, and other specialized VR content.

== See also ==
- LG V30
