= Fujitsu ARROWS ef =

2012 Japanese smartphone

ARROWS ef FJL21
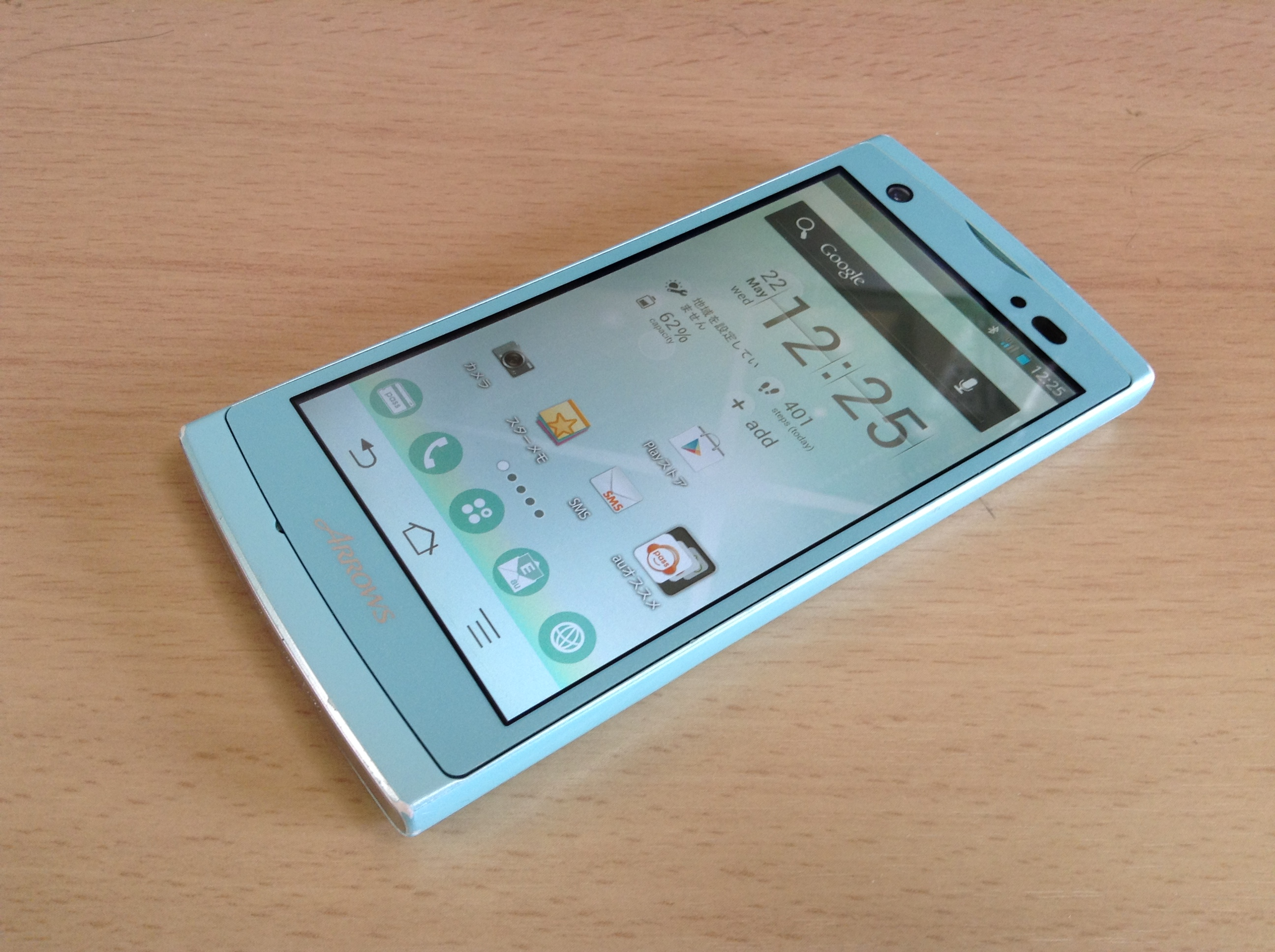
- Brand: au
- Manufacturer: Fujitsu Mobile Communications
- Series: Arrows
- First released: November 2, 2012
- Compatible networks: 3G: CDMA2000 1xMC (au 3G) (New 800 MHz / 2 GHz), W-CDMA (850 MHz / 2 GHz); 2G: GSM (1.9 GHz / 1.8 GHz / 900 MHz)
- Form factor: Bar
- Colors: Soft Blue; Solid Black; Pink Gold
- Dimensions: 127 mm (5.0 in) H 62 mm (2.4 in) W 10.7 mm (0.42 in) D
- Weight: 139 g (4.9 oz)
- Operating system: Android 4.0.4, upgradable to 4.1.2
- CPU: 1.5 GHz dual-core Qualcomm Snapdragon S4 (MSM8960)
- Memory: 1 GB RAM
- Storage: 8 GB ROM
- Removable storage: microSD (up to 2 GB), microSDHC (up to 32 GB), microSDXC (up to 64 GB) (officially supported by KDDI)
- Battery: 1,800 mAh
- Rear camera: Approx. 8.1 megapixels CMOS, autofocus, Full HD video recording
- Front camera: Approx. 1.2 megapixels CMOS
- Display: 4.3-inch TFT LCD, HD (720 × 1280 pixels), approx. 16.77 million colors
- Water resistance: Waterproof and dustproof
- Model: FJL21
- Made in: Japan
- References: 1. SAR value: 0.439 W/kg; 2. Equipped with an FM transmitter

The ARROWS ef FJL21 is a smartphone developed for the Japanese domestic market by Fujitsu Mobile Communications (under the Fujitsu brand, currently FCNT). It was released for KDDI and Okinawa Cellular Telephone Company under the au brand, featuring support for CDMA 1X WIN (au 3G) and 3.9G (au 4G LTE) mobile communication systems. It was released on November 2, 2012.

It was updated to the version V35R45B and addresses critical bugs, most notably resolving an issue where incoming voice calls would occasionally fail to connect and leave no entry in the call history. It also corrects a display bug that caused wallpapers to appear abnormally enlarged.

== Specifications ==
The ARROWS ef is a compact flagship smartphone released for the Japanese carrier au as part of the high-end ARROWS series. Despite its smaller 4.3-inch display—a departure from the series' traditionally larger form factors—the device maintains high-end specifications. To appeal to a broader demographic seeking smaller devices, the manufacturer utilized narrow-bezel technology to minimize the phone's physical footprint without reducing the screen size.

The smartphone incorporates several proprietary hardware and software features designed to improve usability. These include the "Human Centric Engine," which utilizes sensors to keep the display active while the user is actively viewing it, and a rear-mounted fingerprint sensor that doubles as a physical power switch for the display. Additionally, the device features a fast-focusing camera, the "NX! Eco" power-saving utility, and a scratch- and fingerprint-resistant exterior coating known as "Ultra Tough Guard Plus."
