= Sharp Aquos Serie SHL25 =

2014 smartphone model

AQUOS SERIE SHL25
- Brand: au
- Manufacturer: Sharp
- First released: June 13, 2014
- Compatible networks: 3G: CDMA2000 1xMC (CDMA 1X) (New 800 MHz/2 GHz), W-CDMA (850 MHz/2 GHz); 2G: GSM (1.9 GHz/1.8 GHz/900 MHz)
- Colors: Pink; White; Navy
- Dimensions: 134 mm (5.3 in) H 71 mm (2.8 in) W 9.9 mm (0.39 in) D
- Weight: 141 g (5.0 oz)
- Operating system: Android 4.4, upgradable to 5.0
- CPU: 2.3 GHz quad-core Qualcomm Snapdragon 801 (MSM8974AB)
- Memory: 2 GB RAM
- Storage: 32 GB ROM
- Removable storage: microSD (up to 2 GB), microSDHC (up to 32 GB), microSDXC (up to 128 GB) (as officially published by KDDI)
- Battery: 3,150 mAh (non-removable)
- Rear camera: 13.1 megapixels CMOS with 2160p video recording
- Front camera: 2.1 megapixels CMOS
- Display: 5.2-inch PureLED IGZO FHD (1920 × 1080 pixels), 423 ppi, approx. 16.77 million colors
- Made in: China
- References: 1. LTE supports carrier aggregation

The AQUOS SERIE SHL25 is a smartphone manufactured by Sharp for the Japanese domestic market. It was released for the au brand, operated by KDDI and Okinawa Cellular Telephone Company, and supports 3.5G (CDMA 1X WIN), 3.9G (au 4G LTE), and 4G (au 4G LTE CA / WiMAX 2+) mobile communication systems.

It was released on June 13, 2014. Serving as the successor to the SHL23, the display size has been upgraded from the predecessor's 4.8 inches to 5.2 inches. Despite being equipped with a 5.2-inch IGZO LCD equipped with 'PureLED' which provides sustaiable color reproduction and reduces power consumption, the implementation of Sharp's "EDGEST" ultra-narrow bezel design keeps the device width capped at 71 mm, while the overall height has been reduced to 134 mm from the SHL23's 140 mm.

Beginning with this model, Sharp's mobile branding has been unified from the previous "AQUOS PHONE" moniker to "AQUOS", matching the company's line of consumer audiovisual equipment.

The device maintains core signature features—including the EDGEST design, Grip Magic, and Feel UX—while introducing a variety of refinements.
