= URBANO L03 =

2014 smartphone model

URBANO L03 (KYY23)
- Brand: au
- Manufacturer: Kyocera
- Type: Smartphone
- Series: URBANO series
- First released: June 28, 2014
- Predecessor: URBANO L02
- Successor: URBANO V01
- Compatible networks: 3G: CDMA2000 1xMC (au 3G) (New 800 MHz/2 GHz), W-CDMA (850 MHz/2 GHz); 2G: GSM (1.9 GHz/1.8 GHz/900 MHz)
- Form factor: Slate
- Colors: Ivy Green; Purple Black; Pink Gold
- Dimensions: 140 mm (5.5 in) H 70 mm (2.8 in) W 10.4 mm (0.41 in) D
- Weight: 154 g (5.4 oz)
- Operating system: Android 4.4.2
- System-on-chip: Qualcomm Snapdragon 801
- CPU: 2.3 GHz quad-core MSM8974AB
- GPU: Adreno 330
- Memory: 2 GB RAM
- Storage: 16 GB ROM
- Removable storage: microSD (up to 2 GB), microSDHC (up to 32 GB), microSDXC (up to 64 GB) (officially supported by KDDI)
- Battery: 3,000 mAh (non-removable)
- Charging: Under consideration
- Rear camera: Approx. 13 megapixels, CMOS image sensor, face-detection autofocus
- Front camera: Approx. 970,000 pixels, CMOS image sensor (Exmor R for mobile)
- Display: 5.0-inch TFT LCD, FHD (1920 × 1080 pixels), approx. 16.77 million colors
- Water resistance: Waterproofing and dustproofing
- Model: KYY23
- Made in: Japan

URBANO L03 is a smartphone developed by Kyocera for the Japanese domestic market. It was released for KDDI and Okinawa Cellular Telephone Company under the au brand, featuring support for 3.5G (au 3G, formerly CDMA 1X WIN), 3.9G (au 4G LTE), and 4G (au 4G LTE CA / WiMAX 2+) mobile communication systems. Its manufacturing model number is KYY23.

== Colors ==
It was available at Ivy Green, Purple Black, and Pink Gold.

== Overview & specifications ==
This handset is the successor to the URBANO L02 (KYY22), inheriting a similar design philosophy. Along with the TORQUE G01 (KYY24) manufactured by Kyocera and announced alongside it, the URBANO L03 employs an LCD panel built from "Dragontrail X", a newly developed tempered glass material by Asahi Glass (currently AGC). This upgrade provides a slight improvement in structural robustness and impact resistance compared to earlier iterations.

Additionally, it marks the first device in the URBANO series to be equipped with a quad-core processor, alongside introducing support for LTE carrier aggregation (LTE-Advanced) and WiMAX 2.1 (WiMAX 2+).

It was powered by a 2.3GHz Snapdragon 801 chipset. Because the device architecture transitioned to a non-removable battery configuration, the Qi wireless charging support—which was previously handled by swapping in a specialized battery pack—is only natively available in a dedicated variant of the Purple Black color profile. Starting with this generation, marketing documents began utilizing the "Okindaku 充電" (Put-and-Charge) branding, which is a registered trademark originally owned by NTT Docomo.
