= Qua phone PX =

Android smartphone

au Qua phone PX (LGV33)
- Brand: au
- Manufacturer: LG Electronics
- Type: Smartphone
- Series: Qua
- First released: July 1, 2016
- Predecessor: Qua phone
- Compatible networks: 3.9G: FDD-LTE (au VoLTE) (700 MHz / N800 MHz / 2 GHz); 3G: W-CDMA (850 MHz / 2 GHz); 2G: GSM (1.9 GHz / 1.8 GHz / 900 MHz)
- Form factor: Bar
- Colors: White; Navy; Pink
- Dimensions: 148 mm (5.8 in) H 73 mm (2.9 in) W 7.5 mm (0.30 in) D
- Weight: 127 g (4.5 oz) (approx.)
- Operating system: Android 6.0
- System-on-chip: Qualcomm Snapdragon 430 (MSM8937)
- CPU: 1.4 GHz + 1.1 GHz octa-core
- Memory: 2 GB RAM
- Storage: 16 GB
- Removable storage: microSD (up to 2 GB), microSDHC (up to 32 GB), microSDXC (up to 200 GB) (as published by KDDI)
- Battery: 3,000 mAh; Battery life: approx. 105 hours
- Charging: Approx. 90 minutes
- Rear camera: Approx. 16.1 megapixels, backside-illuminated CMOS image sensor, image stabilization, face recognition
- Front camera: Approx. 8.0 megapixels, CMOS image sensor, HD video recording
- Display: 5.2-inch IPS, FHD (1920 × 1080 pixels), approx. 16.77 million colors
- Water resistance: Waterproof, dustproof
- Model: LGV33

The Qua phone PX is a smartphone designed for the Japanese domestic market by the South Korean company LG Electronics.

It is compatible with the 3.9G (au 4G LTE / au VoLTE) and 4G (au 4G LTE CA / WiMAX 2+) mobile communication systems operated by KDDI and Okinawa Cellular Telephone Company under the au brand. Its manufacturing model number is LGV33.

This handset is the second entry in the Qua phone series, with LG Electronics acting as the manufacturer for this specific model.

== Specifications ==
=== Design ===
The device features a rear design with the terminal name, matching the concurrently announced "Qua tab PX" to emphasize their intended use as a paired set. This integration allows for seamless connectivity, enabling users to receive call and SMS notifications from the Qua phone PX on the tablet, as well as smoothly transfer active websites and images between devices.

=== Cameras ===
The main camera was upgraded to approximately 16.1 megapixels from the previous model's 13.1 megapixels, introducing an automatic shooting mode for backlight correction alongside a manual mode for fine-tuning ISO sensitivity and focus. Additionally, the front-facing camera saw a significant upgrade from 2 megapixels to approximately 8 megapixels, facilitating higher-quality selfies.

=== Display ===
It features a 5.2-inch Full HD (1920 × 1080 pixels) IPS liquid crystal display. Structurally, the chassis maintains a slim profile with a standard thickness of 7.5 mm, which reaches 7.9 mm at its thickest point, and weighs a lightweight 127 grams. Despite these compact dimensions, it integrates a 3,000 mAh battery, marking a substantial capacity upgrade from the 2,200 mAh battery found in its predecessor, the original Qua phone.

=== Hardware ===
Internal processing is driven by an octa-core Qualcomm Snapdragon 430 (MSM8937) processor, configured with four cores running at 1.4 GHz and another four running at 1.1 GHz. The memory architecture consists of 2 GB of RAM paired with 16 GB of internal storage. Additionally, the handset offers robust environmental durability, certified with IPX5/IPX7 water resistance and IP6X dust protection. It runs on Android 6.0 and was updated to Android 7.0.
