= LG isai Beat =

Smartphone manufactured by LG

isai Beat LGV34
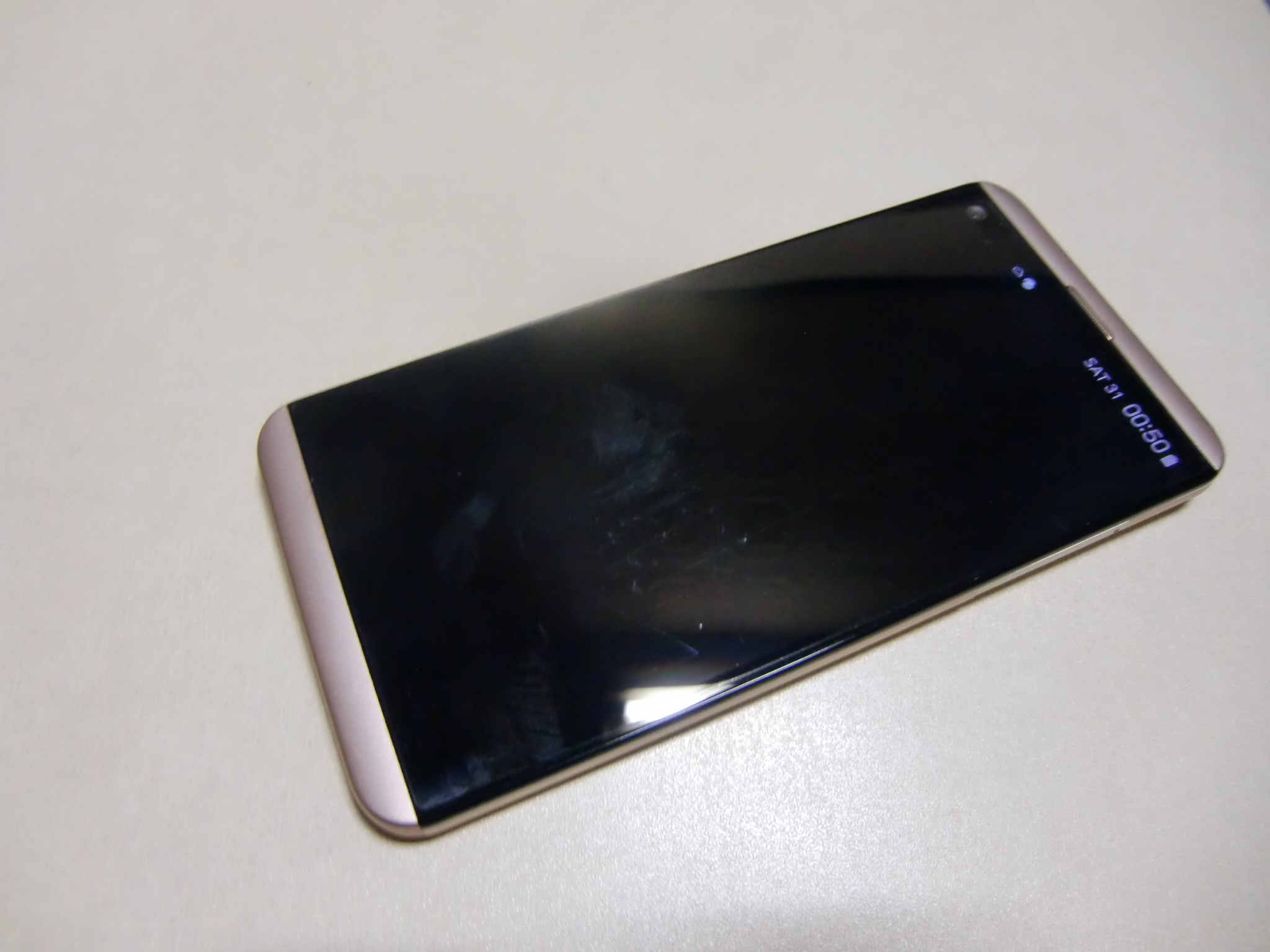
- Front panel view of LGV34
- Brand: au
- Manufacturer: LG Electronics
- First released: November 18, 2016; 9 years ago
- Compatible networks: 3.9G: FDD-LTE (au VoLTE) (700 MHz/N800 MHz/2 GHz); 3G: W-CDMA (850 MHz/2 GHz); 2G: GSM (1.9 GHz/1.8 GHz/900 MHz)
- Colors: Titan; Gold
- Dimensions: 149 mm (5.9 in) H 72 mm (2.8 in) W 8.0 mm (0.31 in) D
- Weight: 146 g (5.1 oz)
- Operating system: Android 7.0
- CPU: Qualcomm Snapdragon 820 (MSM8996 2.2 GHz + 1.6 GHz quad-core)
- Memory: 4 GB RAM
- Storage: 32 GB
- Removable storage: microSDHC (up to 32 GB), microSDXC (up to 256 GB) (officially supported by KDDI)
- Battery: 3,000 mAh
- Charging: Approx. 90 minutes
- Rear camera: Approx. 16.0 megapixels + approx. 8.0 megapixels (dual camera), backside-illuminated CMOS image sensor, image stabilization (video recording supported), face recognition, laser autofocus, dual flash
- Front camera: Approx. 5.0 megapixels, CMOS image sensor
- Display: Main: 5.2-inch IPS display, WQHD (2560 × 1440 pixels), approx. 16.77 million colors Secondary: IPS display, 160 × 1040 pixels, approx. 16.77 million colors
- Connectivity: 3.9/4G: FDD-LTE / LTE-Advanced (au 4G LTE / au 4G LTE CA) (700 MHz/N800 MHz/2 GHz), WiMAX 2.1 (WiMAX 2+); 3.5G: UMTS (W-CDMA); Other: Wireless LAN (IEEE 802.11a/b/g/n/ac 5 GHz/2.4 GHz)

The isai Beat LGV34 is a smartphone released on November 18, 2016 and developed by the South Korean company LG Electronics for the Japanese domestic market. It was released for KDDI and Okinawa Cellular Telephone Company under the au brand, featuring support for 3.9G (au 4G LTE / au VoLTE) and 4G (au 4G LTE CA / WiMAX 2+) mobile communication systems.

Serving as the successor to the LGV32, this handset is a localized variant of the global LG V20 model for the Japanese market. However, the screen size has been downsized from the V20's 5.7 inches to 5.2 inches, and the battery is non-removable.

== Specifications ==
=== Audio ===
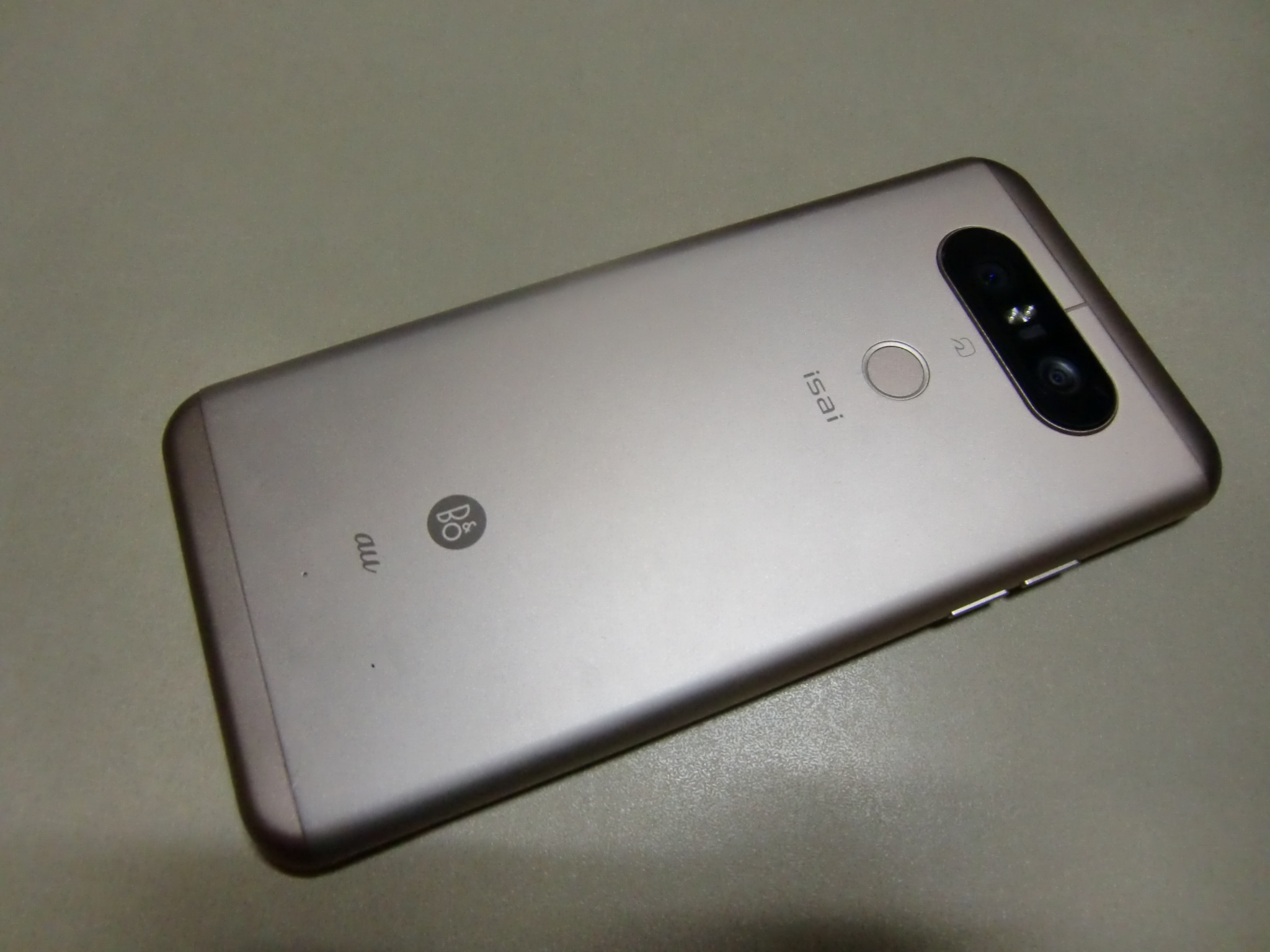
Rear panel view

A major distinguishing feature is its audio tuning, which was developed in collaboration with B&O PLAY to faithfully reproduce original acoustic tones. Additionally, it integrates a 32-bit quad DAC "ES9218" from ESS Technology, enabling exceptionally clear audio playback.

The device incorporates four digital-to-analog converters (DACs) that transform digital audio streams into analog signals. This configuration effectively diminishes background noise by 50% to ensure highly distinct sound reproduction.

Engineered to accommodate an extensive array of high-resolution audio formats, the system provides native compatibility with standard lossless codecs such as FLAC, ALAC, WAV, and AIFF. Furthermore, the hardware is capable of processing Direct Stream Digital (DSD) playback, delivering an even higher tier of acoustic fidelity for audiophile-grade listening.

=== Display, battery and hardware ===
The device features a 5.2-inch IPS liquid crystal display that boasts a WQHD resolution of 2560×1440 pixels. Out of the box, it runs on the Android 7.0 operating system, which comes pre-installed on the hardware.

Engineered to withstand daily wear and tear, the handset possesses robust environmental protection, meeting IPX5/7 standards for water resistance and an IP6X rating for dust resistance. It was powered by a 3,000 mAh non-removable battery.

In terms of performance and storage capacity, the smartphone is equipped with 4 GB of RAM alongside 32 GB of internal storage. Users can further expand this capacity via a dedicated card slot that supports microSDXC cards up to 256 GB.

=== Cameras ===
For its camera system, the device adopts a new 135° wide-angle lens on its rear setup and a 120° wide-angle lens for the front-facing camera, capturing environments wider than the human field of view. Furthermore, it marks the first implementation of a dual-camera layout on the rear side within the isai series.

=== Software ===
The phone also retains a secondary display known as the "Second Screen" at the top of the main display panel. It allows users to check the date, time, or incoming messages while using other applications without needing to turn the entire screen on or off, providing quick access to frequently used applications. As features tailored uniquely to Japan, the device offers waterproofing and digital television reception capabilities, though it lacks an infrared communication port. Out of the box, it runs on the Android 7.0 operating system, which comes pre-installed on the hardware.
