= Sharp SH011 =

2011 mobile phone model

SH011
- Brand: au
- Manufacturer: Sharp
- Type: Feature phone
- First released: January 28, 2011
- Predecessor: SH004
- Compatible networks: CDMA 1X (CDMA2000 1xRTT); CDMA 1X WIN (CDMA2000 1xEV-DO Rev.A)
- Form factor: Clamshell
- Colors: Fuchsia Pink; Lavender Purple; Camellia White
- Dimensions: 111 mm (4.4 in) H 50 mm (2.0 in) W 15.1 mm (0.59 in) D
- Weight: 128 g (4.5 oz)
- Operating system: KCP+
- CPU: Qualcomm MSM7500 600 MHz
- Storage: Approx. 700 MB
- Removable storage: microSD (up to 2 GB) microSDHC (up to 32 GB)
- Rear camera: 9.57 MP CCD, autofocus, image stabilization
- Front camera: None
- Display: Main: 3.2 in (81 mm), New Mobile ASV LCD, Full Wide VGA (480×854 pixels), 260k colors Sub: 1.0 in (25 mm), OLED, 1 color
- Water resistance: Waterproof
- Made in: China

The SH011 is a CDMA 1X WIN (later au 3G) compatible mobile phone developed by Sharp for the Japanese domestic market, marketed under the au brand by KDDI and Okinawa Cellular Telephone.

== Overview ==
- It is the de facto successor to the SH004, with its camera function upgraded from 8.09 megapixels to 9.57 megapixels, with a zoom of 4.8x.
- In terms of design, the body features a multi-layer coating and utilizes a metallic-style frame to create a sense of luxury. Additionally, it features a design similar to the SH-02A, a model manufactured by Sharp for NTT Docomo.
- Notably, it is the final KCP+ / EV-DO Rev.A compatible device for personal use manufactured by Sharp for au, as well as the last model released among existing personal au mobile phones supporting KCP+ / EV-DO Rev.A.
- In order to focus efforts on enhancing the domestic smartphone lineup, Sharp temporarily withdrew from producing feature phones for au until the release of the AQUOS K SHF31, an Android-equipped feature phone (garaho) launched on February 20, 2015.

== History ==
- October 18, 2010 – Official announcement by KDDI and Sharp.
- January 28, 2011 – Sales began in all regions except the Kyushu region.
- January 29, 2011 – Sales began in the Kyushu region.
- October 2011 – Sales ended in all regions except Okinawa.
- April 2012 – Sales ended in the Okinawa region.
- July 22, 2012 – Due to the discontinuation of service on the L800MHz (Old 800 MHz band / CDMA Band-Class 3) frequency, subsequent service relied exclusively on the N800MHz (New 800 MHz band / CDMA Band-Class 0) and 2GHz (CDMA Band-Class 6) bands.
