= Isai VL LGV31 =

isai VL LGV31
- Brand: G series
- Manufacturer: LG Electronics
- Type: Smartphone
- First released: December 12, 2014
- Availability by region: Japan
- Predecessor: isai FL LGL24
- Successor: isai vivid LGV32
- Compatible networks: 3.9G：FDD-LTE （au VoLTE） (700MHz/N800MHz/2GHz); 3G：W-CDMA (850MHz/2GHz); 2G：GSM (1.9GHz/1.8GHz/900MHz)
- Form factor: Slate
- Dimensions: 145 mm (5.7 in) H 76 mm (3.0 in) W 10.5 mm (0.41 in) D
- Weight: 154 g (5.4 oz)
- Operating system: Original: Android 4.4 "KitKat"; Planned: Android 5.0 "Lollipop"
- System-on-chip: Qualcomm Snapdragon 801
- CPU: 2.5 GHz quad-core Krait 400
- GPU: Adreno 330
- Memory: 3 GB
- Storage: 32 GB
- Removable storage: microSD up to 2 GB; microSDHC up to 32 GB; microSDXC up to 128 GB
- Battery: 3000 mAh (not user-replaceable)
- Rear camera: 13 MP
- Front camera: 2.1MP, f2.0
- Display: 5.5 in (140 mm) 2560x1440 (534 ppi) 1440p IPS LCD
- SAR: 0.29 W/kg
- Website: http://www.lg.com/jp/mobile-phone/lg-LGV31

isai VL LGV31 is an Android smartphone developed by LG Electronics for the Japanese market with the carrier au. It launched 12 December 2014 as a successor to the isai FL LGL24.

au announced on 4 June 2015 that the LGV31 was one of ten au models planned to receive an upgrade to Android 5.0.

== Works cited ==
- Koguchi, Takahiro (2015-06-04). "au、Android 5.0 Lollipopにアップデートする10機種を発表". Engadget (in Japanese).
