= Aquos Phone SL IS15SH =

Android mobile phone

AQUOS PHONE SL IS15SH
- Brand: au
- Manufacturer: Sharp
- Type: Smartphone
- Series: IS series
- Family: AQUOS PHONE
- First released: July 6, 2012
- Predecessor: AQUOS PHONE IS14SH
- Compatible networks: 3G: CDMA2000 1xMC (CDMA 1X WIN) (New 800MHz/2GHz), W-CDMA (850MHz/2GHz); 2G: GSM (1.9GHz/1.8GHz/900MHz); Data: CDMA2000 1xEV-DO MC-Rev.A (WIN HIGH SPEED), UMTS (W-CDMA), Wi-Fi (IEEE 802.11a/b/g/n)
- Form factor: Slider
- Colors: Mint Blue; Cassis Pink; Dahlia Black
- Dimensions: 121 mm (4.8 in) H 58 mm (2.3 in) W 14.9 mm (0.59 in) D
- Weight: 152 g (5.4 oz)
- Operating system: Android 4.0.4
- System-on-chip: Qualcomm Snapdragon S2 MSM8655T
- CPU: 1.4 GHz
- Memory: 1 GB RAM
- Storage: 4 GB ROM
- Removable storage: microSD (up to 2 GB), microSDHC (up to 32 GB)
- SIM: microSIM (au IC card)
- Battery: 1,430 mAh
- Rear camera: 8.04 MP CMOS, autofocus, image stabilization
- Display: 3.7 in (94 mm) qHD (960×540 pixels), 260,000 colors, New Mobile ASV LCD touchscreen
- Water resistance: Waterproof, Dustproof
- Model: SHI15 (AF33)
- Made in: China

The AQUOS PHONE SL IS15SH is an Android smartphone developed by Sharp Corporation for the Japanese market, sold by KDDI and Okinawa Cellular Telephone under the au brand as part of the IS series. It supports CDMA 1X WIN networks. Its manufacturing model number is SHI15 and its manufacturer model number is AF33.

== History ==
On May 15, 2012, KDDI and Sharp officially announced the device and was released on July 6, 2012 simultaneously across Japan.

== Specifications ==
=== Hardware ===
The AQUOS PHONE SL IS15SH serves as the successor to the IS14SH and is the first sliding AQUOS PHONE model for au to feature waterproof and dustproof capabilities. The "SL" in the product name stands for "Slide."

It measures 58 mm wide, 121 mm long, and 14.9 mm thick, with a weight of approximately 152 grams. The device is powered by a 1.4 GHz Qualcomm Snapdragon S2 MSM8655T processor, paired with 1 GB of RAM and 4 GB of internal storage. It features a 3.7-inch qHD (960×540 pixels) New Mobile ASV LCD display capable of rendering 260,000 colors.

The main camera uses an 8.04-megapixel CMOS sensor supporting autofocus, image stabilization, and lens apertures up to f/2.8. It lacks a front-facing camera.

Connectivity options include 3G (CDMA2000 1xMC, EV-DO MC-Rev.A, W-CDMA), 2G (GSM), Wi-Fi (IEEE 802.11a/b/g/n), Bluetooth 3.0, infrared (IrSimple/IrSS), FeliCa for Osaifu-Keitai, and 1-Segment TV tuning. Power is supplied by a 1,430 mAh removable battery, providing up to 490 minutes of continuous talk time and 490 hours of standby time.

=== Software ===
The device runs on Android 4.0.4 with the iWnn IME for Android SH Edition for Japanese text and handwriting input. It integrates feature-phone-like usability controls, combining the DEL and BACK keys on the numeric keypad and enabling automatic switching to phone-number mode upon number entry.

Pre-installed applications include the KDDI E-mail app (supporting @ezweb.ne.jp addresses over 3G and Wi-Fi), Gmail with real-time push notification support, Google Talk, Twitter, mixi for SH, Google Maps NAVI, LISMO, Skype au, and au one Friends Note. Unlike its sibling model, the ISW16SH, it does not support Mobile WiMAX or NFC.
