= Sharp W61SH =

2008 mobile phone model

W61SH
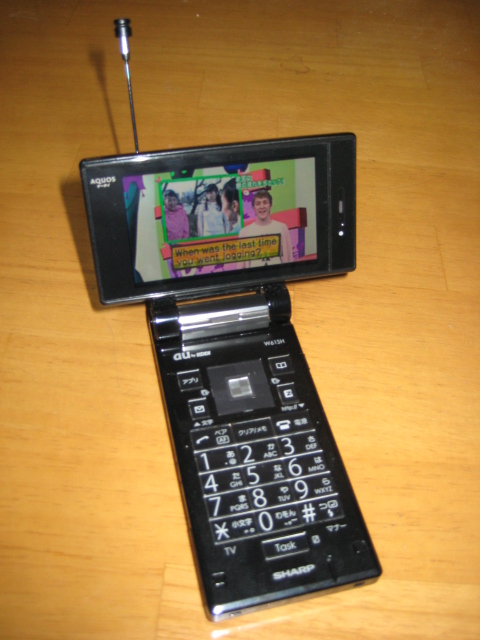
- W61SH (Cool Black)
- Brand: au
- Manufacturer: Sharp
- First released: January 9, 2008
- Colors: Vivid Pink; Pure White; Cool Black; Fresh Green; Marine Blue
- Dimensions: 104 mm (4.1 in) H 48 mm (1.9 in) W 19.9 mm (0.78 in) (thinnest part: 16.9 mm) D
- Weight: 131 g (4.6 oz)
- Operating system: REX OS + KCP
- CPU: Qualcomm MSM6550 @ 225 MHz
- Storage: Approx. 100 MB internal data folder
- Removable storage: microSD (up to 2 GB)
- Charging: 110 minutes
- Rear camera: 2.03 megapixels CMOS, AF
- Front camera: None
- Display: 2.8-inch New Mobile ASV LCD, Wide QVGA (240 × 400 pixels), approx. 260,000 colors Sub-display: LED

The W61SH is a mobile phone developed by Sharp for the Japanese domestic market, released for the au brand operated by KDDI and Okinawa Cellular Telephone Company.

Released on January 9, 2008, the W61SH is the second AQUOS Phone offered by au.

== Specifications ==
=== Display ===
Its major differences from the previously announced SH905iTV and SoftBank 920SH from other carriers are that it does not feature a Full Wide VGA resolution display, and its screen size is significantly smaller at 2.8 inches compared to 3.2 inches, making it the smallest AQUOS Phone to date, excluding the Vodafone 905SH. The sub-display utilizes an LED indicator similar to the neon (W42T), setting it apart from previous AQUOS Phone designs.

The W61SH features a straight, blocky aesthetic resembling AQUOS Phones offered by other carriers unlike the asymmetrical design of the W51SH. It also incorporates two main display enhancement technologies: the "SV Engine+", which enhances color and outline, and a "Reflect Barrier Panel" that makes the display viewable in sunlight areas. While some view it as a spiritual successor to the W51SH, its design concept, screen size, and initial color palette align more closely with the "W52SH" released in au's Summer 2007 lineup.

=== Service compatibility ===
Designed for the au network, the handset supports the EZ Book "Wide Comic" service, allowing users to read e-books in a full-screen landscape orientation. It is also compatible with a wide range of au services, such as LISMO, Osaifu-Keitai (mobile wallet), Touch Message, security lock services, Earthquake Early Warnings, EZ Keitai Arrange, EZ Channel Plus, EZ News Flash, EZ Navi Walk (featuring 3D navigation and voice input), as well as decoration and wrapping mail.

However, because the phone does not run on the KCP+ platform, it lacks support for EV-DO Rev.A, Multi-Play Window, au one Gadget, VIVID UI, and Bluetooth.
