= URBANO V01 =

2014 smartphone model

URBANO V01 (KYV31)
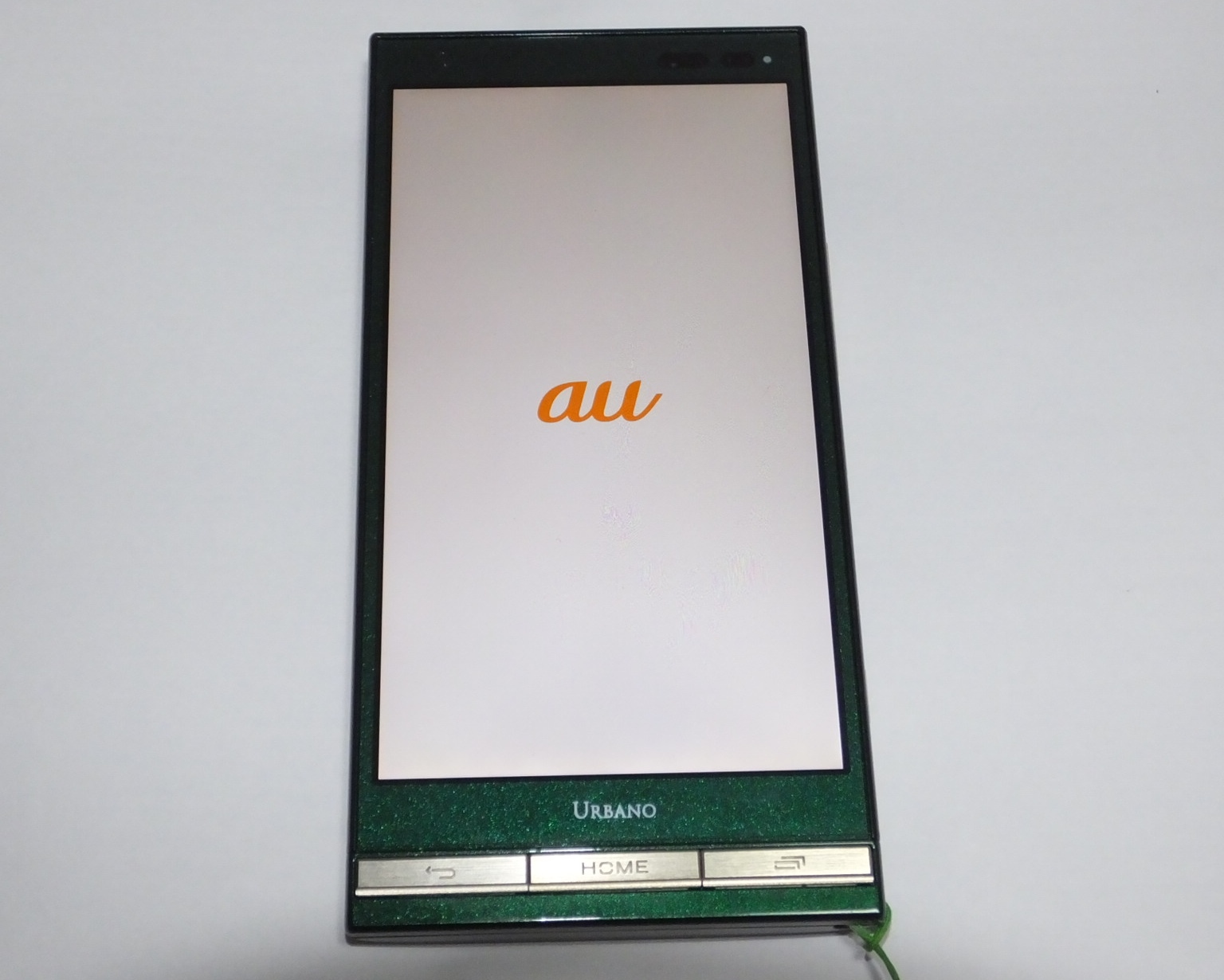
- au URBANO V01 (KYV31)
- Brand: au
- Manufacturer: Kyocera
- Series: URBANO series
- First released: December 12, 2014
- Compatible networks: 3.9G: FDD-LTE (au VoLTE) (700 MHz / N800 MHz / 2 GHz); 3G: W-CDMA (850 MHz / 2 GHz); 2G: GSM (1.9 GHz / 1.8 GHz / 900 MHz)
- Form factor: Bar
- Colors: Royal Blue (navy); Platinum White (white); Forest Green (green)
- Dimensions: 141×70×9.9 mm (5.55×2.76×0.39 in)
- Weight: Approx. 155 g
- Operating system: Android 4.4
- CPU: 2.3 GHz quad-core Qualcomm Snapdragon 801 (MSM8974AB)
- Memory: 2 GB RAM
- Storage: 16 GB ROM
- Removable storage: microSDHC (up to 32 GB), microSDXC (up to 128 GB) (officially supported by KDDI) ※ Use of microSD cards 2 GB or lower, or microSDHC/microSDXC cards with a Class 2 or lower (2 MB/s) transfer rate is not recommended.
- SIM: au Nano IC Card 04 (VoLTE)
- Battery: 3,000 mAh (non-removable)
- Charging: Approx. 120 minutes
- Rear camera: Approx. 13 megapixels, CMOS, face detection autofocus
- Front camera: Approx. 970,000 pixels, CMOS (Exmor R for mobile)
- Display: 5.0-inch TFT LCD, FHD (1920 × 1080 pixels), approx. 16.77 million colors
- Connectivity: 3.9/4G: FDD-LTE / LTE-Advanced (au 4G LTE / au 4G LTE CA) (700 MHz / N800 MHz / 2 GHz), WiMAX 2.1 (WiMAX 2+); 3.5G: UMTS (W-CDMA); Other: Wireless LAN (IEEE 802.11a/b/g/n/ac 5 GHz / 2.4 GHz)
- Made in: Japan
- References: 1. LTE supports carrier aggregation

The URBANO V01 is a smartphone manufactured by Kyocera for the Japanese domestic market. It was released for KDDI and Okinawa Cellular Telephone Company under the au brand, featuring support for 3.9G (au 4G LTE / au VoLTE) and 4G (au 4G LTE CA / WiMAX 2+) mobile communication systems. Its manufacturing model number is KYV31.

== Overview ==
Announced in October 2014 and released on December 12, 2014, the smartphone serves as a minor revision model of the URBANO L03 (KYY23), introducing voice calling utilizing Voice over LTE (VoLTE) and compatibility with the 700 MHz band service deployed sequentially starting from fiscal year 2015. Notably, this handset is entirely incompatible with domestic 3G (CDMA2000 1x) voice calls (CDMA2000 1xRTT) and data communication (1xEV-DO Rel.0/Rev.A/MC-Rev.A) within Japan.

== Specifications ==
=== Hardware ===
Kyocera tuned its signature Smart Sonic Receiver technology to provide enhanced, high-quality voice calls. While it shared its core hardware specifications with the earlier summer 2014 URBANO L03 model—including a 5-inch Full HD (1080×1920 pixels) LCD display, a 2.3 GHz quad-core processor, a 13-megapixel CMOS main camera, and Android 4.4—the V01 introduced design refinements. It also featured a tactile physical home key alongside metallic side keys and camera rings.

=== Connectivity features ===
Due to the introduction of VoLTE support, existing users upgrading to this device are required to swap their au IC card from the older "au nano IC Card (4G LTE)" to the newer "au Nano IC Card 04 (VoLTE)". The wireless charging (Qi) option that was available on the base model has been omitted from this version. Furthermore, it is the only device in au's Android smartphone Winter 2014 lineup that lacks support for native High-resolution audio file playback.

Since the device went on sale before the mandatory SIM-unlock regulations took effect in Japan, the SIM lock cannot be removed. Consequently, it cannot be used on MVNO networks like mineo or UQ Mobile, both of which strictly require an unlocked SIM slot for this generation of hardware.
