= Aquos Phone CL IS17SH =

2012 smartphone model

AQUOS PHONE CL IS17SH (SHI17)
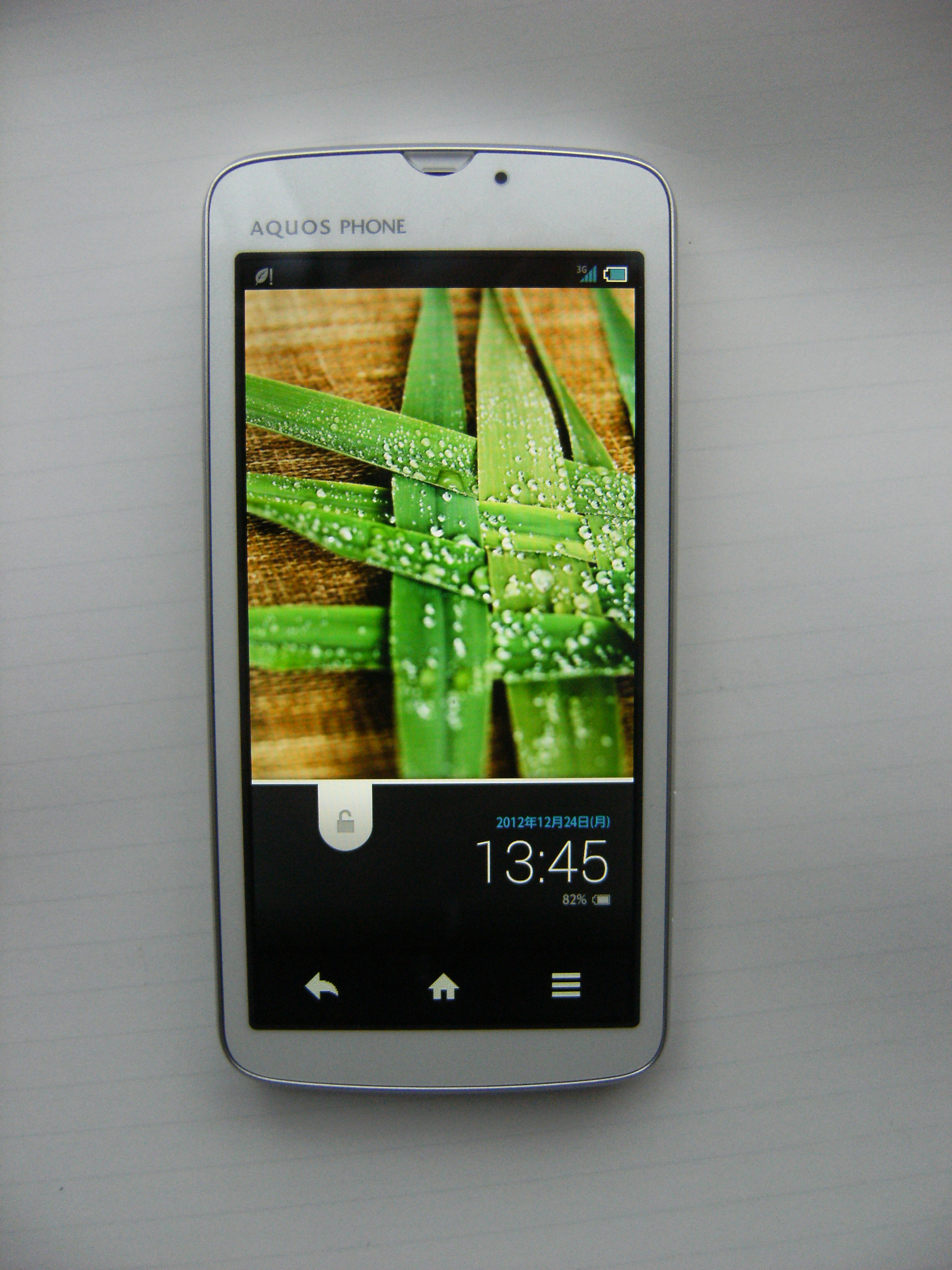
- Brand: au
- Manufacturer: Sharp
- First released: July 20, 2012
- Compatible networks: CDMA 1X (CDMA2000 1xMC)
- Form factor: Bar (waterproof and dustproof)
- Colors: Pure White; Dark Navy; Coral Pink
- Dimensions: 132 mm (5.2 in) H 65 mm (2.6 in) W 8.9 mm (0.35 in) D
- Weight: 132 g (4.7 oz)
- Operating system: Android 4.0
- CPU: 1.4 GHz Qualcomm Snapdragon S2 (MSM8655T)
- Memory: 1 GB RAM
- Storage: 8 GB ROM (approx. 8 GB data folder)
- Removable storage: microSD (up to 2 GB), microSDHC (up to 32 GB) (as published by KDDI)
- Battery: 1,460 mAh (interchangeable with the IS13SH)
- Rear camera: Approx. 8.04 megapixels CMOS, autofocus, HD video recording
- Front camera: None
- Display: 4.2-inch Touchscreen New Mobile ASV LCD, QHD (540 × 960 pixels), 262,144 colors Sub-display: 2.1-inch Memory LCD (below the main screen), 56 × 304 pixels, monochrome
- Connectivity: CDMA 1X WIN (WIN HIGH SPEED / Packet WIN) (CDMA2000 1xEV-DO MC-Rev.A / Rev.A / Rel.0), Wireless LAN (IEEE 802.11b/g/n)
- Water resistance: Supported
- Model: SHI17 (Manufacturer code: AS46)
- Made in: China
- References: 1. SAR value: 0.460 W/kg; 2. Equipped with a standard 3.5 mm stereo headphone jack.

The AQUOS PHONE CL IS17SH is a smartphone developed by Sharp for the Japanese domestic market, distributed by KDDI and Okinawa Cellular Telephone Company under the au brand and released on July 20, 2012. It is part of the IS series and is compatible with CDMA 1X WIN (later branded as au 3G). The manufacturing model number is SHI17 and the manufacturer code is AS46.

The phone serves as a minor revision of the AQUOS PHONE IS13SH.

== Specifications ==
=== Display ===
It shipped with Android OS 4.0 out of the box. The "CL" in the product name stands for "Combination LCD".

==== Combination Display ====
It features a "Combination Display" that merges a 4.2-inch QHD LCD with a low-power, always-on 2.1-inch Memory LCD. When the main screen is active, the Memory LCD portion functions as the "Back / Home / MENU" keys. When the main display is turned off, it stays active to show the current time, incoming alerts, step counts, and the title of tracks playing via LISMO.

=== User interface ===
The device features "Feel UX," a newly designed user interface developed in collaboration with the renowned firm Frog Design, which is characterized by its sophisticated visual graphics. This interface enhances accessibility by allowing users to launch essential applications, such as the camera and email client, directly from the lock screen. Additionally, it integrates Sharp's proprietary energy-saving technology, "Shin-Ekowaza" (New Eco-Technique), which provides users with real-time data and graphical visualizations tracking the precise amount of power conserved.
