= KDDI Mobile =

KDDI Mobile was a mobile phone service operated in the United States. The brand was established under KDDI America – local branch of Japanese telecommunication company KDDI – to meet the needs of Japanese people living in the United States. The service originally operated on the Sprint network, and later on AT&T, as an MVNO. Initially targeting Japanese expatriates, they offered the Japanese-enabled KDDI Mobile 6600-J handset, and their plan minutes included calls to Japan.

In January 2019, Locus Telecommunications, the operator of the h2o Wireless and KDDI Mobile MVNOs in the U.S., was acquired from KDDI America by Telrite Holdings, Inc., and the KDDI Mobile MVNO is now defunct.
