= H2O Wireless =

American telecommunications company

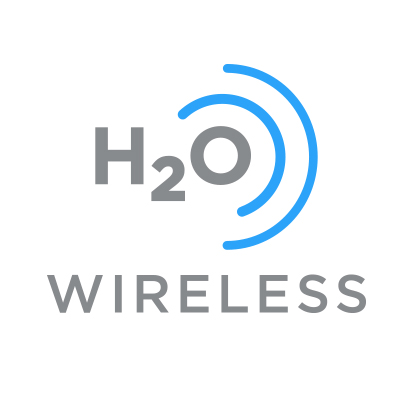
- Type: Brand of Locus Telecommunications, a subsidiary of Telrite Holdings
- Industry: Wireless service
- Founded: 2005; 21 years ago
- Headquarters: Teaneck, New Jersey, New Jersey, U.S.
- Area served: United States
- Key people: Reginald P. McFarland (CEO); Jack Woo (President); Will Curry (CSO); Brian Rathman (CTO)
- Products: GSM, International Call, Wireless Data
- Parent: Telrite Holdings, Inc.
- Website: www.h2owireless.com

H2O Wireless is a United States-based prepaid cell phone service, that utilizes the AT&T network. It is a brand of the mobile virtual network operator (MVNO) Locus Telecommunications, a subsidiary of Telrite Holdings, Inc., since 2019. Locus was formerly a subsidiary of KDDI America corporation, starting in 2010. H2O Wireless is primarily advertised as a non-restrictive phone service for customers to bring or buy unlocked smartphones, although AT&T contract/locked phones may be accepted as well.

== Service plans ==
As of October 2026, H2O Wireless offers unlimited plans, multi-month plans, and pay-as-go plans. Unlimited plans range from $20 per month (including 3GB of high-speed data plus 2GB of hotspot data) to $60 per month (including 60GB of high-speed data plus 20GB of hotspot data). Data-only plans for tablets are also available.

== Authorized dealers ==
Due to only having one office, H2O Wireless sources its services from "authorized dealers" who work as independent contractors under their own company name.
