= KDDI Designing Studio =

KDDI's consumer showroom

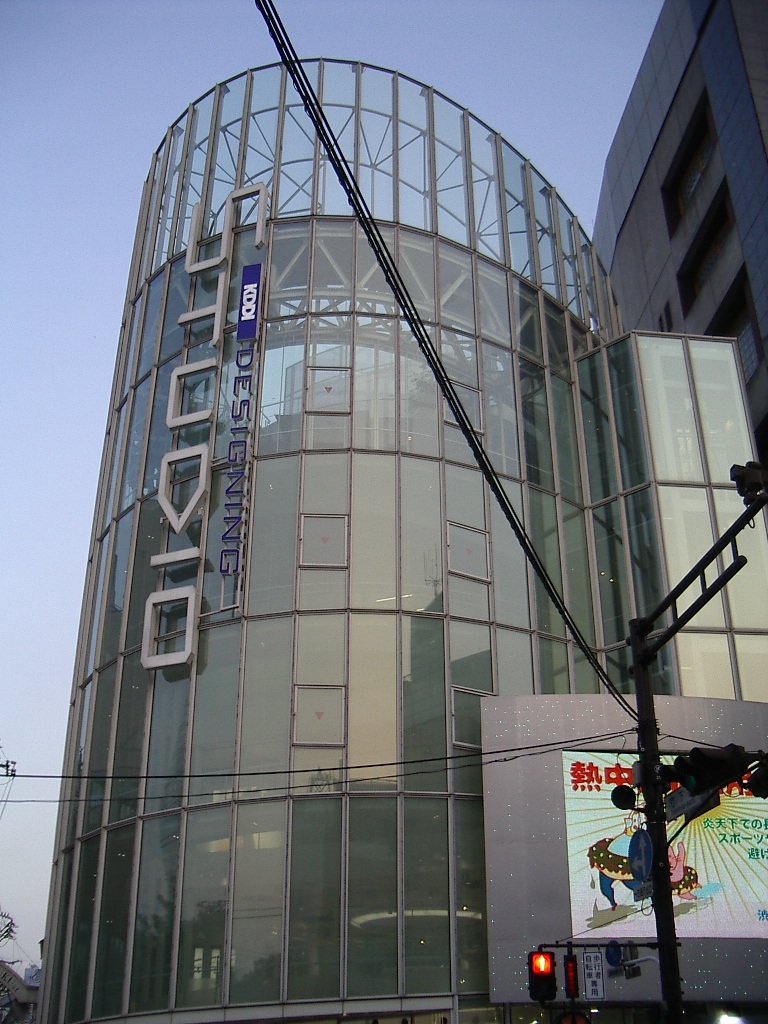
KDDI Designing Studio

KDDI DESIGNING STUDIO, also known as "K Sta" (Kスタ), is KDDI's consumer showroom in Harajuku.

== Overview ==
KDDI Designing Studio was built on March 4, 2005 in Harajuku. The showroom is 8 minutes walk from Harajuku Station Takeshita Street exit. In 2008, KDDI Designing Studio created "au Garden" (auの庭, au no niwa), like the one in their commercial, opened to the public from April 26, 2008 to June 3, 2008.

=== Floors ===
1F: Loving Lounge

A lounge with free internet and a video advertisement of the newest cell phone model. On some days, there are live events featuring popular musical artists.

2F: au Design Park

Many new cell phone models on display which visitors are free to try out.

3F: KDDI Creation Studio

Some developing software by KDDI is available to try out.

4F: LISMO FOREST

A store just for LISMO goods. (Opened on July 10, 2007)

5F: WIRED CAFE 360°

An ordinary internet café.

== Gallery ==
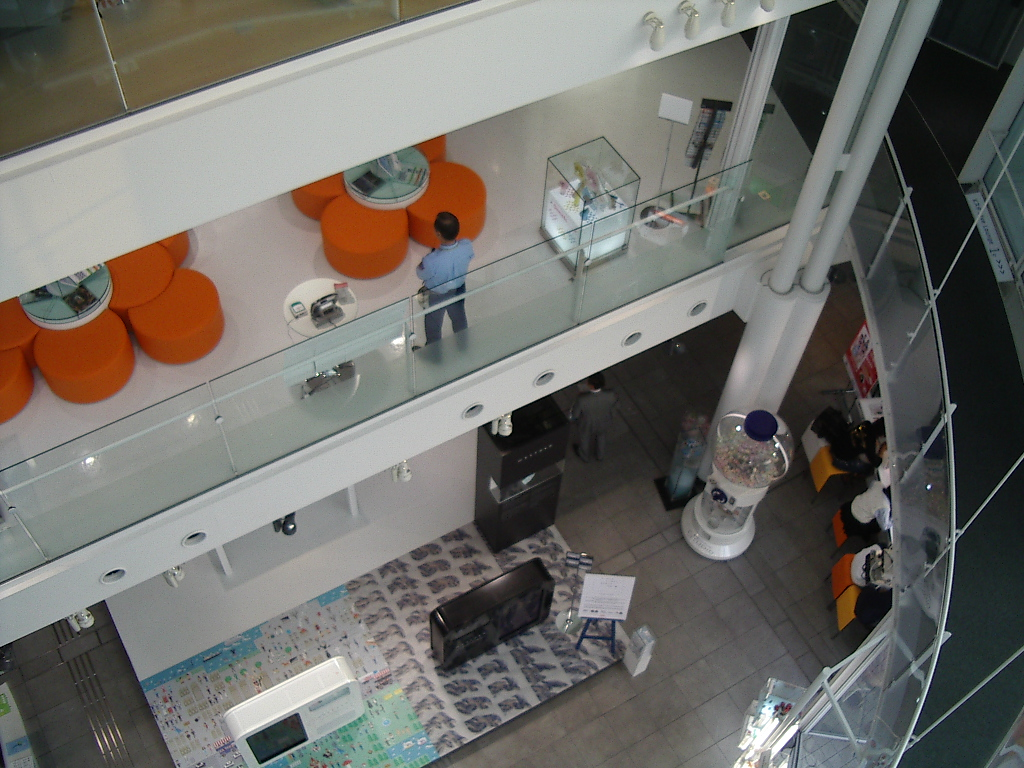

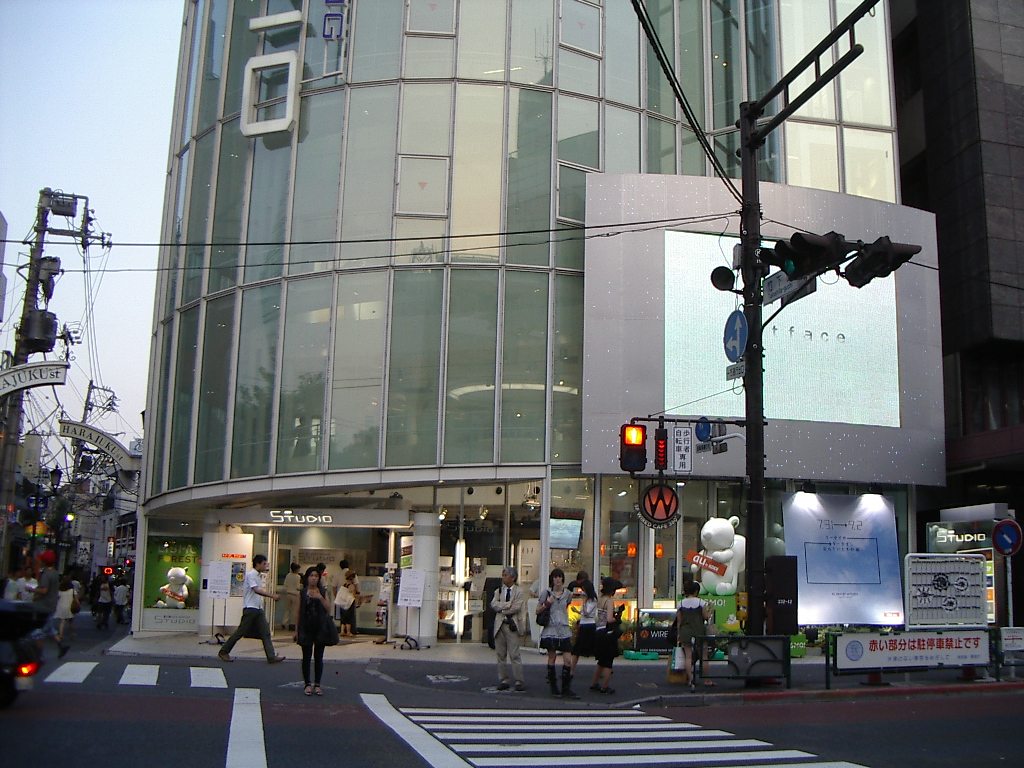
