= Au 3G =

Cell network by au and KDDI, 2002–2022

Au 3G was a cellular network in Japan, operated by the Japanese mobile phone companies au and KDDI. It was a replacement for their cdmaOne services.

== Launch ==
Au 3G originally released on April 1, 2002 as CDMA 1X with speeds up to 144 kbps. At launch there were five phones.

- A3011SA (Sanyo) (GPS)
- A3012CA (Casio) (GPS)
- A3013T (Toshiba) (GPS)
- A1011ST (Tottori Sanyo) (Standard)
- A1012K (Kyocera) (Standard)

== Upgrades ==
On November 28, 2003, au upgraded their 3G towers to CDMA 1X WIN and provided higher speeds up to 2.4 Mbps. At launch there were three devices.

- W11H (Hitachi) (Mobile)
- W11K (Kyocera) (Mobile)
- W01K (Kyocera) (Data Communication Card (PC))

== Discontinuation ==
On November 29, 2021, KDDI and au announced that au 3G would be shutting down. On March 31, 2022, au shut down their 3G service, limiting connections to LTE/5G.
