= KDDI India Private Limited =

- Type: Private, Subsidiary
- Industry: ICT
- Founded: 2007
- Founder: Kazuo Inamori
- Headquarters: Gurgaon, India; Bangalore, Chennai, Delhi, Mumbai, Neemrana, Ahmedabad,
- Area served: Worldwide
- Key people: Tomofumi Sezaki, Managing Director
- Services: System integration, IT infrastructure, Network, IT management, Data center
- Total assets: 7,50,00000 rupees
- Number of employees: 65 approx.
- Parent: KDDI Corporation
- Website: www.kddi.com

KDDI India Private Limited is an information and communications technology company headquartered in Gurugram, Haryana, India. It operates as a subsidiary of Japanese telecommunications company KDDI Corporation.

== History ==
KDDI entered the Indian market in January 2004 through a partnership with Indo-Fuji Information Technology Private Limited In July 2006, KDDI established a representative office in Delhi under KDDI Singapore. The company operates branch offices across India, including locations in Ahmedabad, Bengaluru, Chennai, Gurugram, Mumbai, Neemrana, and New Delhi. The company began operating its corporate office in New Delhi on 19 September 2007.
