= Au 4G LTE =

Cell network by au and KDDI

Au 4G LTE is a cell network by au and KDDI and is a replacement to Au 3G.

== Launch ==
On September 21, 2012 Au released its 4G LTE service with a speed of 25 Mbps for upload and a speed of 75 Mbps for download. . There were originally 11 early devices.

- Apple iPhone 5 (Mobile) (Launch Device)
- Sony Xperia VL (SOL21) (Mobile)
- Samsung GALAXY S III Progre (SCL21) (Mobile)
- SHARP AQUOS PHONE SERIE (SHL21) (Mobile)
- Fujitsu ARROWS ef (FJL21) (Mobile)
- LG Optimus G (LGL21) (Mobile)
- HTC J butterfly (HTL21) (Mobile)
- Kyocera DIGNO S (KYL21) (Mobile)
- Casio G'zOne TYPE-L (CAL21) (Mobile)
- Pantech VEGA (PTL21) (Mobile)
- Sharp AQUOS PAD (SHT21) (Tablet)

== Upgrades ==
In early 2013, au upgraded its 4G LTE service by expanding LTE coverage using 800 MHz and 1.5 GHz frequencies alongside 2.1 GHz and introduced higher download speeds up to 112.5 Mbps.

In October 2013, au introduced a maximum download speeds of 150 Mbps in selected areas and coverage was expanded.

In 2014 they expanded to over 20,000 LTE base stations and they introduced au VoLTE, which made calling more clearer.

In 2015, they upgraded the service to the final speed of 225 Mbps for download and made it so that compatible devices can use multiple LTE bands.
