= KDDI =

Japanese telecommunications operator

KDDI Corporation

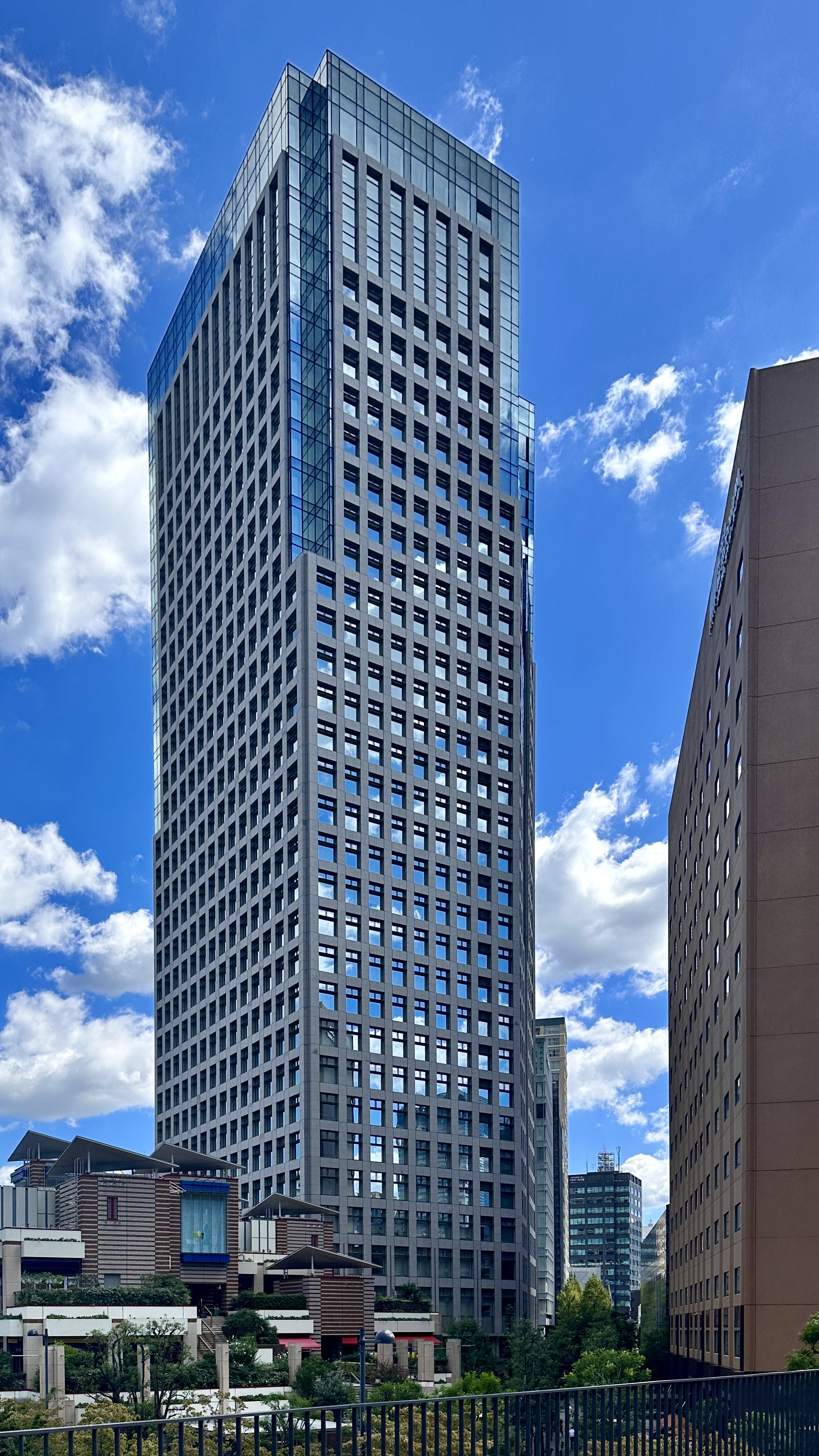
- Headquarters in Iidabashi, Chiyoda, Tokyo
- Native name: KDDI株式会社
- Romanized name: Keidīdīai kabushiki gaisha
- Formerly: DDI Corporation (1984–2000)
- Type: Public
- Traded as: TYO: 9433; TOPIX Core 30 Component
- Industry: Telecommunications
- Predecessor: KDD Corporation; IDO Corporation
- Founded: June 1, 1984; 42 years ago (as DDI)
- Founder: Kazuo Inamori
- Headquarters: Iidabashi, Chiyoda, Tokyo, Japan
- Key people: Takashi Tanaka (CEO); Makoto Takahashi (president & CEO)
- Products: Fixed line; mobile telephony; Internet services; digital television
- Revenue: ▲JP¥ 5.24 trillion (2020)
- Net income: ▲JP¥ 639.77 billion (2020)
- Number of employees: 44,952 (2020)
- Subsidiaries: List: Okinawa Cellular Telephone Company (53.9%); J:COM (50%); UQ Communications (32.3%); BIGLOBE (100%); Aeon Holdings (100%); Chubu Telecommunications (80.5%); Wire and Wireless (95.2%); Telasa (50%); au Financial Holdings (100%); Supership Holdings; au Energy Holdings; KDDI Matomete Office; KDDI Digital Divergence Holdings; KDDI Engineering; KDDI Research (91.7%); KDDI Cableships & Subsea Engineering; Japan Telecommunication Engineering Service; KDDI America; KDDI China; KDDI Asia Pacific; Telehouse Holdings; Kyocera Communication System (23.4%); Mobaoku (33.4%); Kakaku.com (17.4%); Lac (32.4%)
- Website: www.kddi.com/english/

KDDI Corporation (Japanese: KDDI株式会社, Hepburn: Keidīdīai kabushiki gaisha) is a Japanese telecommunications operator. It was established in 2000 through the merger of DDI Corporation (第二電電, Daini Denden), a long-distance communications company; KDD Corporation (ケイディディ), Japan's former state-monopoly international telecommunications provider; and IDO Corporation (日本移動通信, Nippon Idō Tsūshin), a mobile network operator.

In 2001, KDDI fully integrated its mobile operations by absorbing the regional companies of the DDI-Cellular Group, unifying them under Au brand. It currently stands as the second-largest mobile telecommunications provider in Japan in terms of the number of contracts, following NTT Docomo.

KDDI provides mobile cellular services primarily using Au brand, alongside its sub-brands UQ Mobile and Povo. ISP network services are provided under Au One Net brand, while Au Hikari is the name under which its Fiber to the Home (FTTH) services are marketed. Historically, the company also offered ADSL broadband (ADSL One) and IP telephony over copper (Metal Plus), but these legacy services have since been discontinued.

== History ==
On April 1, 2002, au by KDDI launched 3G networks using CDMA2000 1x technology.

On November 28, 2003, au by KDDI launched EV-DO Rev 0 service in the "CDMA 1X WIN" brand, and revolutionized Japan's mobile telecommunication industry by introducing fixed rate data subscription plans at a data rate of 2.4 Mbit/s.

In December 2006, au by KDDI became the first carrier to provide an EV-DO Rev A service at a data rate of 3.1Mbit/s (downlink), 1.8 Mbit/s (uplink).

au by KDDI has been successful with its EZ wireless data services, EZweb, EZweb@mail, EZappli, EZchakuuta, ezmovie, and EZnaviwalk (GPS), using the advanced WAP technology. It supports both Java ME and BREW application environments.

In November 2004 au by KDDI introduced the music include ringtone download service Chaku Uta Full (music ringtone full), for download of full length songs to mobile phones. Within six months from introduction, on June 15, 2005, customers had downloaded 10 million full length Chaku Uta Full songs.

As of end of June 2005, au by KDDI has 20,122,700 customers, among which 18,723,200 (93%) are 3G CDMA2000 subscribers. It is Japan's second-largest cellular operator with an increasing 20.0% market share.

On January 26, 2006, the first pointing local search application, Mapion Local Search - Powered by GeoVector, was launched on the KDDI network on their GPS and compass equipped handsets. In January 2007, KDDI announced its ten new 3G models for spring 2007, and a concept of its new designer phone Media Skin by Tokujin Yoshioka which would later be displayed at the Museum of Modern Art in New York with the Infobar, Talby and Neon models. Toshiba, Casio, Sanyo, Kyocera, Hitachi, Sony Ericsson, Sharp, and Panasonic have manufactured the other models. In March 2007, Media Skin started selling.

KDDI announced that it would collaborate with the Taiwanese manufacturer HTC Corp. to sell the mobile phone HTC J in Japan starting May 2012. The HTC J mobile phone featured the Android 4.0 operating system.

On October 21, 2011, KDDI buys Content Delivery Network CDNetworks For $167 Million.

KDDI together with Sumitomo Group signed an agreement with Myanmar State owned Myanmar Post and Telecommunication (MPT) in July 2014 to jointly operate a mobile phone service in Myanmar for next 10 years.

Consumer showroom is set in Harajuku called, "KDDI Designing Studio".

TU-KA (TU-KA by KDDI), a subsidiary company of KDDI, was a 2G PDC cellular operator in three metropolitan areas (Tokyo, Nagoya, and Osaka), which did not apply a 3G license. TU-KA was best known for having singer Ayumi Hamasaki to appear in their commercials. TU-KA was closed on March 31, 2008.

DDI Pocket, a PHS operator, was previously owned by KDDI but was spun off as Willcom which is now incorporated into Y!Mobile.

In August 2014, KDDI announced it was joining forces with five other global companies, including Google to build a 60 Tbit/s undersea data transmission cable linking the United States West Coast and Japan. The cable started operation in June 2016.

KDDI and Ericsson began working together in December 2015 in order to research and develop 5G technology.

== Lawsuits ==
In 2003, several class action complaints were filed against DDI for misrepresenting and/or failing to disclose material facts about the company's financial results. The parties agreed on a $4.4 million settlement in 2006.

== See also ==
- au
- KDDI Mobile
- G-Book, a telematics service provided by Toyota in Japan only
- KDDI India Private Limited
- List of telephone operating companies
