= Dual-mode (disambiguation) =

Dual-mode mostly refers to vehicle related technologies in terms of used infrastructure:

- Dual-mode vehicles

or in terms of power source:

- Dual-mode bus
- Global Hybrid Cooperation for the General Motors/DaimlerChrysler/BMW hybrid vehicle technology often called "Dual-Mode"
- Electro-diesel locomotives, sometimes called "dual-mode" or "dual-mode power" locomotives

It can also refer to:

- Dual-mode mobiles
