= Advanced Mobile Phone System =

Analog mobile phone system standard

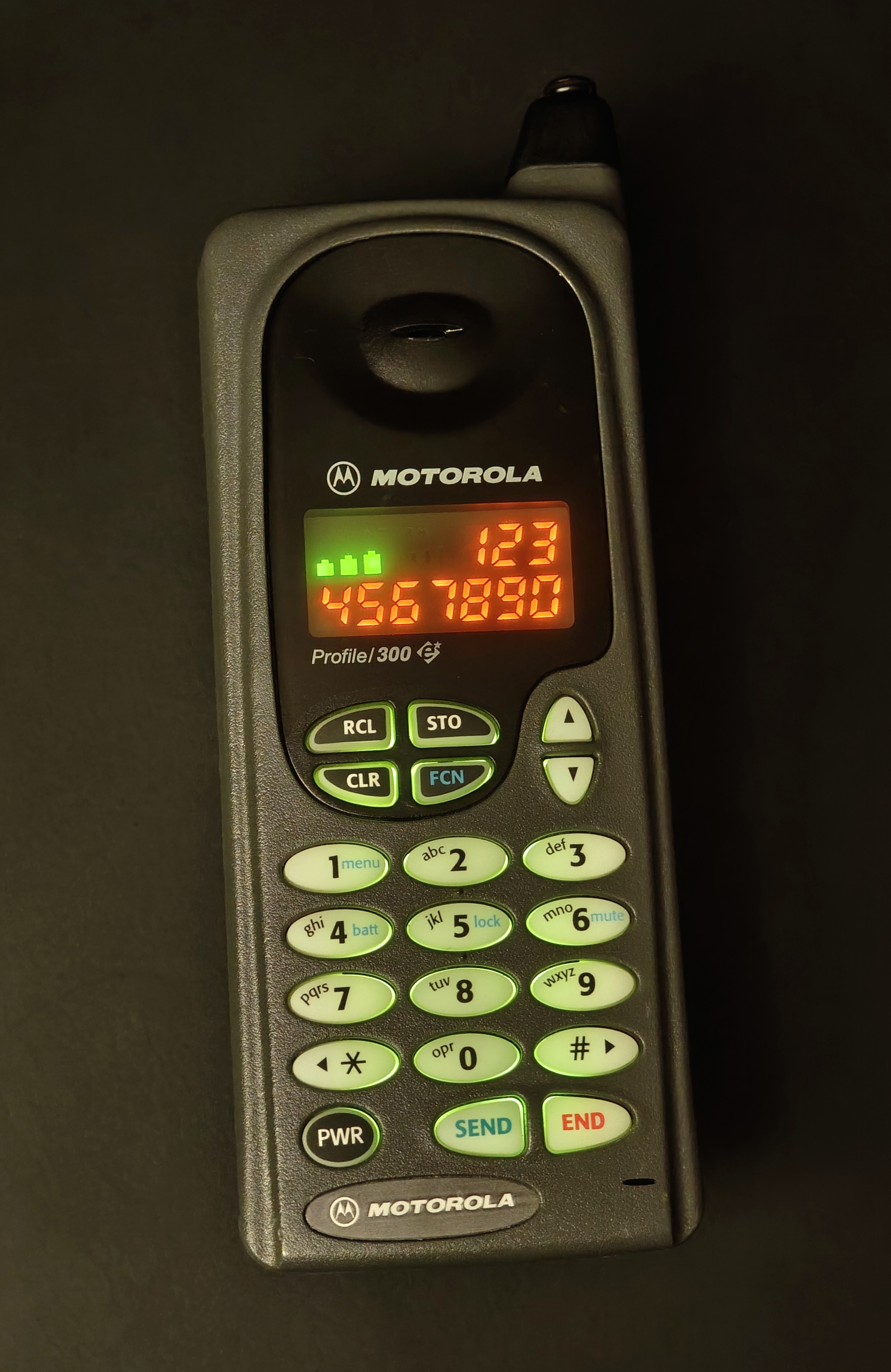
Motorola Profile 300e, an analog AMPS mobile phone, c. 1997

Advanced Mobile Phone System (AMPS) was an analog mobile phone system standard originally developed by Bell Labs and later modified in a cooperative effort between Bell Labs and Motorola. It was officially introduced in the Americas on October 13, 1983, and was deployed in many other countries, including Israel in 1986, Australia in 1987, Singapore in 1988, and Pakistan in 1990.

AMPS ran on the 800-850 MHz UHF radio spectrum band. Audio was transmitted using wide 30 kHz channels, although in later years a narrowband variant, also called NAMPS, was made with reduced 10 kHz channels. Every device was identified using an electronic serial number (ESN).

It was the primary analog mobile phone system in North America (and other locales) through the 1980s and into the 2000s. As of February 18, 2008, carriers in the United States were no longer required to support AMPS, and companies such as AT&T and Verizon Communications have discontinued this service permanently. AMPS was discontinued in Australia in September 2000, in India in October 2004 in Israel in January 2010, and in Brazil in 2010.

== Standards ==
AMPS was originally standardized by American National Standards Institute (ANSI) as EIA/TIA/IS-3. EIA/TIA/IS-3 was superseded by EIA/TIA-553 and TIA interim standard with digital technologies. The cost of wireless service became so low that phone cloning, an illegal method to bypass call charges, has virtually disappeared.

== History ==
External videos
- Advanced Mobile Phone System (AMPS) (YouTube: AT&T Archives) 1978 Bell Labs film explaining the technology behind AMPS.

The first cellular network efforts began at Bell Labs and with research conducted at Motorola. In 1960, John F. Mitchell

became Motorola's chief engineer for its mobile-communication products, and oversaw the development and marketing of the first pager to use transistors.

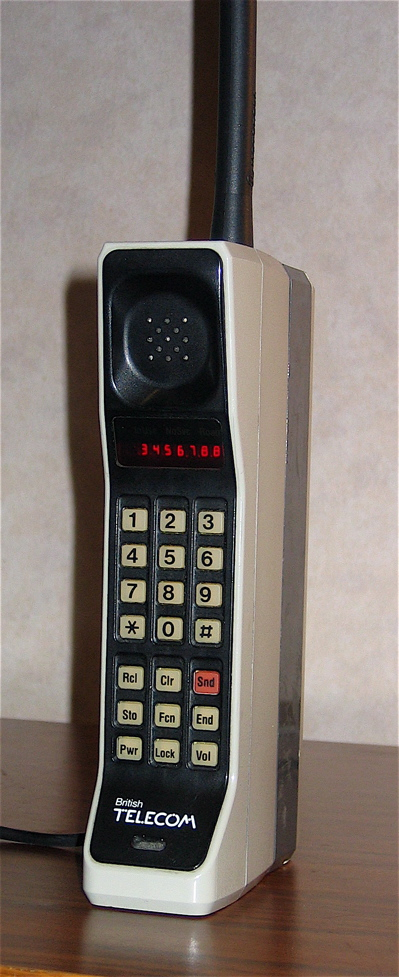
The Motorola DynaTAC 8000X TACS mobile phone from c. 1984

Motorola had long produced mobile telephones for automobiles, but these large and heavy models consumed too much power to allow their use without the automobile's engine running. Mitchell's team, which included Dr. Martin Cooper, developed portable cellular telephony. Cooper and Mitchell were among the Motorola employees granted a patent for this work in 1973. The first call on the prototype reportedly connected to a wrong number.

While Motorola was developing a cellular phone, from 1968 to 1983 Bell Labs worked out a system called Advanced Mobile Phone System (AMPS), which became the first cellular network standard in the United States. The Bell system deployed American Society for Testing and Materials (ASTM) in Chicago, Illinois, first as an equipment test serving approximately 100 units in 1978, and subsequently as a service test planned for 2,000 billed units. Motorola and others designed and built the cellular phones for this and other cellular systems. Louis M. Weinberg, a marketing director at AT&T, was named the first president of the AMPS corporation. He served in this position during the startup of the AMPS subsidiary of AT&T.

Martin Cooper, a former general manager for the systems division at Motorola, led a team that produced the first cellular handset in 1973 and made the first phone call from it. In 1983 Motorola introduced the DynaTAC 8000x, the first commercially available cellular phone small enough to be easily carried. He later introduced the so-called Bag Phone.

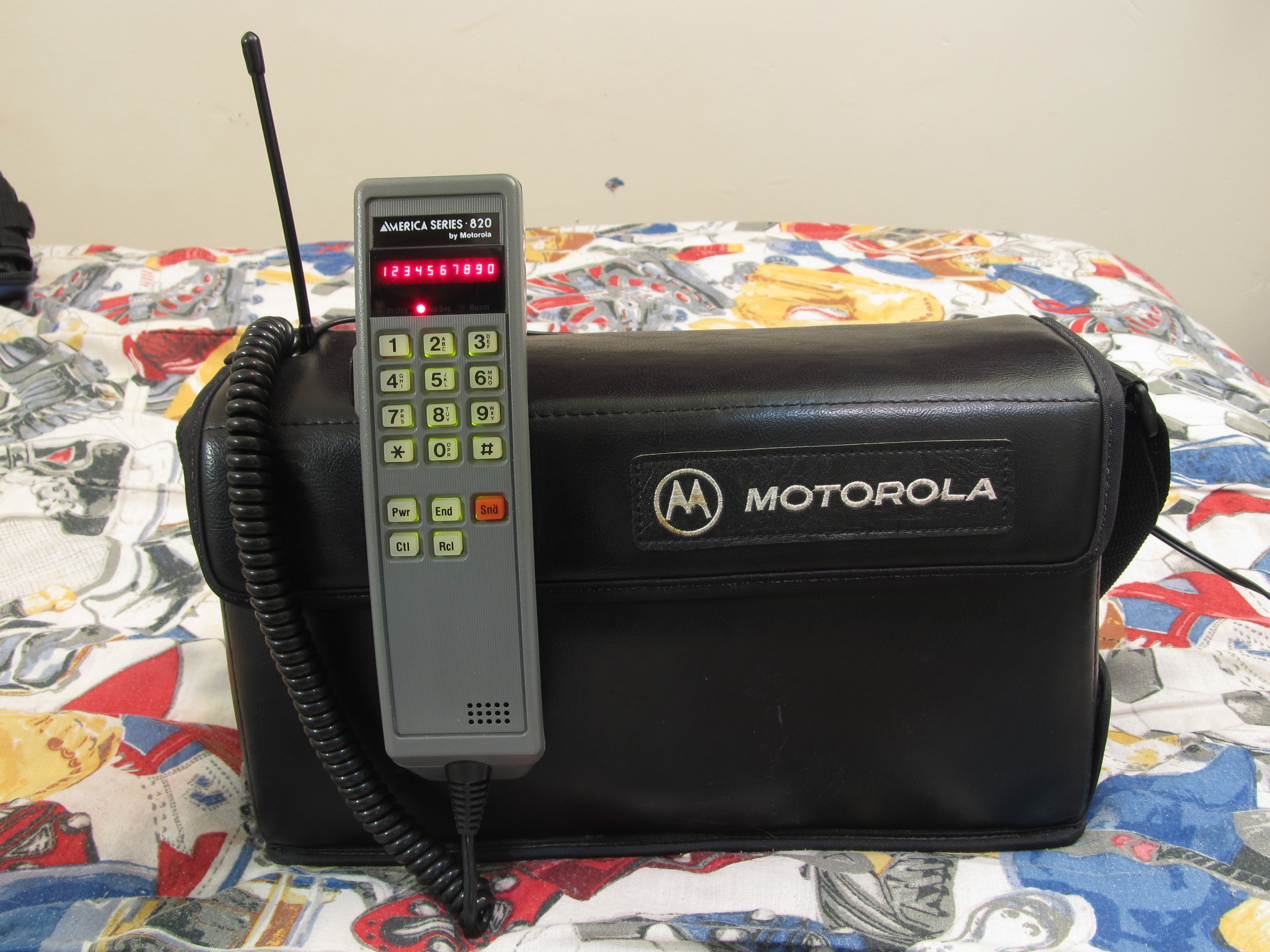
A Motorola bag phone from c. 1991 designed for the AMPS network

In 1992, the first smartphone, called IBM Simon, used AMPS. Frank Canova led its design at IBM and it was demonstrated that year at the COMDEX computer-industry trade-show. A refined version of the product was marketed to consumers in 1994 by BellSouth under the name Simon Personal Communicator. The Simon was the first device that can be properly referred to as a "smartphone", even though that term was not yet coined.

== Technology ==
AMPS is a first-generation cellular technology that uses separate frequencies, or "channels", for each conversation. It therefore required considerable bandwidth for a large number of users. In general terms, AMPS was very similar to the older "0G" Improved Mobile Telephone Service it replaced, but used considerably more computing power to select frequencies, hand off conversations to land lines, and handle billing and call setup.

What really separated AMPS from older systems is the "back end" call setup functionality. In AMPS, the cell centers could flexibly assign channels to handsets based on signal strength, allowing the same frequency to be re-used, without interference, if locations were separated enough. The channels were grouped so a specific set was different from the one used on the cell nearby. This allowed a larger number of phones to be supported over a geographical area. AMPS pioneers coined the term "cellular" because of its use of small hexagonal "cells" within a system.

AMPS suffered from many weaknesses compared to today's digital technologies. As an analog standard, it was susceptible to static and noise, and there was no protection from 'eavesdropping' using a scanner or an older TV set that could tune into channels 70–83.

== Cloning ==
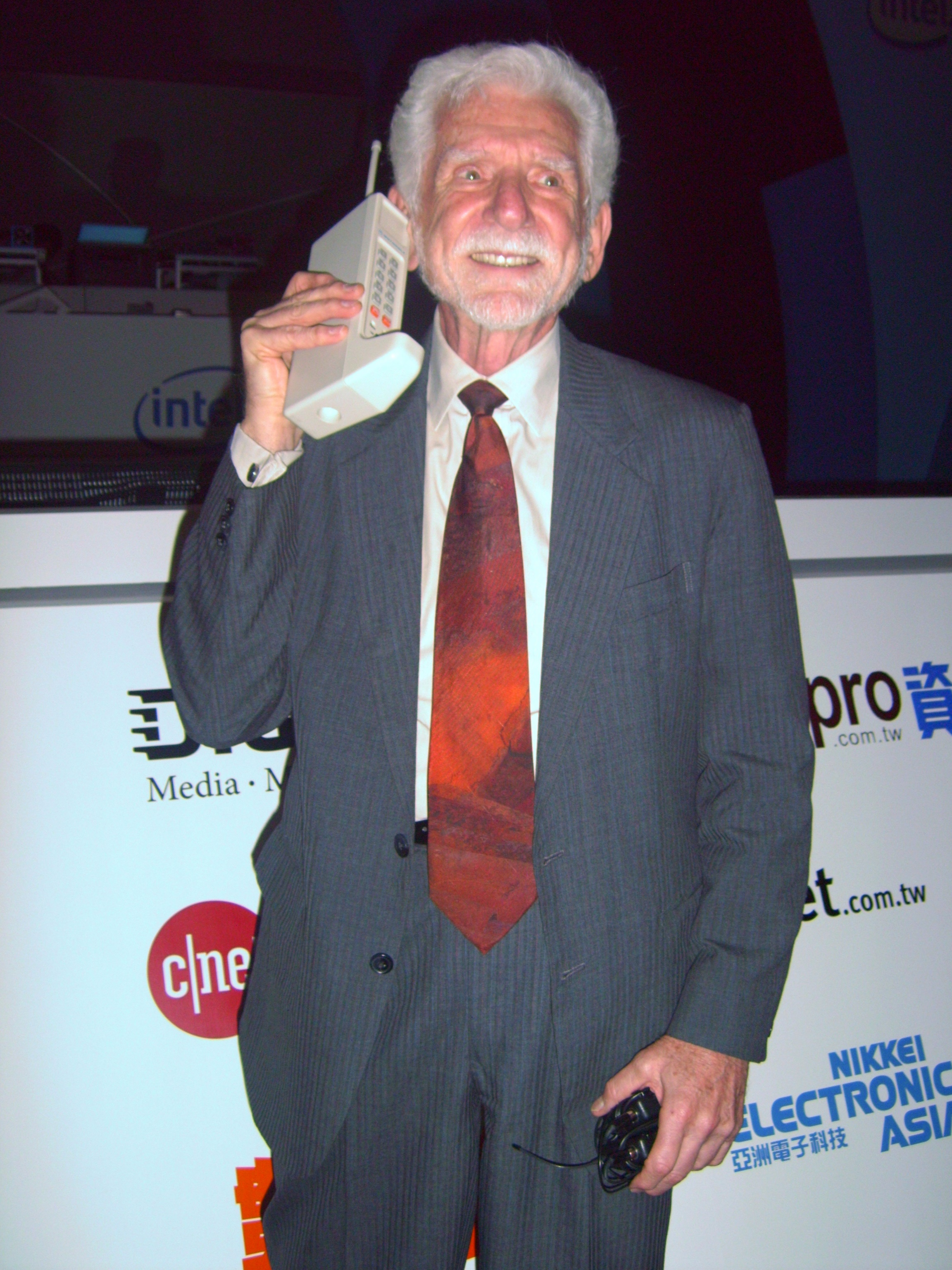
Martin Cooper of Motorola in 2007, reenacting the first private handheld mobile-phone call on a larger prototype model in 1973

In the 1990s, an epidemic of "cloning" cost the cellular carriers millions of dollars. An eavesdropper with specialized equipment could intercept a handset's ESN (Electronic Serial Number) and MDN or CTN (Mobile Directory Number or Cellular Telephone Number). The Electronic Serial Number, a 12-digit number sent by the handset to the cellular system for billing purposes, uniquely identified that phone on the network. The system then allowed or disallowed calls and/or features based on its customer file. A person intercepting an ESN/MDN pair could clone the combination onto a different phone and use it in other areas to make calls without paying.

Cellular phone cloning became possible with off-the-shelf technology in the 1990s. Would-be cloners required three key items:

1. A radio receiver, such as the Icom PCR-1000, that could tune into the Reverse Channel (the frequency on which AMPS phones transmit data to the tower)
2. A PC with a sound card and a software program called Banpaia
3. A phone that could easily be used for cloning, such as the Oki 900

The radio, when tuned to the proper frequency, would receive the signal transmitted by the cell phone to be cloned, containing the phone's ESN/MDN pair. This signal would feed into the sound-card audio-input of the PC, and Banpaia would decode the ESN/MDN pair from this signal and display it on the screen. The hacker could then copy that data into the Oki 900 phone and reboot it, after which the phone network could not distinguish the Oki from the original phone whose signal had been received. This gave the cloner, through the Oki phone, the ability to use the mobile-phone service of the legitimate subscriber whose phone was cloned – just as if that phone had been physically stolen, except that the subscriber retained his or her phone, unaware that the phone had been cloned—at least until that subscriber received his or her next bill.

The problem became so large that some carriers required the use of a PIN before making calls. Eventually, the cellular companies initiated a system called RF Fingerprinting, whereby it could determine subtle differences in the signal of one phone from another and shut down some cloned phones. Some legitimate customers had problems with this though if they made certain changes to their own phone, such as replacing the battery and/or antenna.

The Oki 900 could listen in to AMPS phone calls right out of the box with no hardware modifications.

== Frequency bands ==
AMPS cellular service operated in the 850 MHz Cellular band. For each market area, the United States Federal Communications Commission (FCC) allowed two licensees (networks) known as "A" and "B" carriers. Each carrier within a market used a specified "block" of frequencies consisting of 21 control channels and 395 voice channels. Originally, the B (wireline) side license was usually owned by the local phone company, and the A (non-wireline) license was given to wireless telephone providers.

At the inception of cellular in 1983, the FCC had granted each carrier within a market 333 channel pairs (666 channels total). By the late 1980s, the cellular industry's subscriber base had grown into the millions across America and it became necessary to add channels for additional capacity. In 1989, the FCC granted carriers an expansion from the previous 666 channels to the final 832 (416 pairs per carrier). The additional frequencies were from the band held in reserve for future (inevitable) expansion. These frequencies were immediately adjacent to the existing cellular band. These bands had previously been allocated to UHF TV channels 70–83.

Each duplex channel was composed of 2 frequencies. 416 of these were in the 824–849 MHz range for transmissions from mobile stations to the base stations, paired with 416 frequencies in the 869–894 MHz range for transmissions from base stations to the mobile stations. Each cell site used a different subset of these channels than its neighbors to avoid interference. This significantly reduced the number of channels available at each site in real-world systems. Each AMPS channel had a one way bandwidth of 30 kHz, for a total of 60 kHz for each duplex channel.

Laws were passed in the US which prohibited the FCC type acceptance and sale of any receiver which could tune the frequency ranges occupied by analog AMPS cellular services to prevent fraud and breach in privacy. Though the service is no longer offered, these laws remain in force (although they may no longer be enforced).

=== Narrowband AMPS ===
Motorola proposed an AMPS enhancement known as narrowband AMPS (NAMPS or N-AMPS). It was rolled out in 1991 along with Motorola NAMPS compatible handsets. The purpose of narrowband AMPS was to relieve the choked capacity of AMPS in major metropolitan areas. It was achieved by splitting the 30 kHz channel into three separate 10 kHz ones that immediately increased network capacity without requiring new cell towers.

== Digital AMPS ==
Later, many AMPS networks were partially converted to D-AMPS, often referred to as TDMA (TDMA is a generic term that applies to many 2G cellular systems). D-AMPS, commercially deployed since 1993, was a digital, 2G standard used mainly by AT&T Mobility and U.S. Cellular in the United States, Rogers Wireless in Canada, Telcel in Mexico, Telecom Italia Mobile (TIM) in Brazil, VimpelCom in Russia, Movilnet in Venezuela, and Cellcom in Israel. In most areas, D-AMPS is no longer offered and have been replaced by more advanced digital wireless networks.

== Successor technologies ==
AMPS and D-AMPS have now been phased out in favor of either CDMA2000 or GSM, which allow for higher capacity data transfers for services such as WAP, Multimedia Messaging System (MMS), and wireless Internet access. There are some phones capable of supporting AMPS, D-AMPS and GSM all in one phone (using the GAIT standard).

Unlike in the United States, the Canadian Radio-television and Telecommunications Commission (CRTC) and Industry Canada have not set any requirement for maintaining AMPS service in Canada. Rogers Wireless has dismantled their AMPS (along with IS-136) network; the networks were shut down May 31, 2007. Bell Mobility and Telus Mobility, who operated AMPS networks in Canada, announced that they would observe the same timetable as outlined by the FCC in the United States, and as a result would not begin to dismantle their AMPS networks until after February 2008.

OnStar relied heavily on North American AMPS service for its subscribers because, when the system was developed, AMPS offered the most comprehensive wireless coverage in the US. In 2006, ADT asked the FCC to extend the AMPS deadline due to many of their alarm systems still using analog technology to communicate with the control centers. Cellular companies who own an A or B license (such as Verizon and Alltel) were required to provide analog service until February 18, 2008. After that point, however, most cellular companies were eager to shut down AMPS and use the remaining channels for digital services. OnStar transitioned to digital service with the help of data transport technology developed by Airbiquity, but warned customers who could not be upgraded to digital service that their service would permanently expire on January 1, 2008.

== Commercial deployments of AMPS by country ==
Country	Main Cellular Operator	Launch date	End of service	Notes
United States		1983	2008	Verizon Wireless—Formerly operated an AMPS network. On February 18, 2008, Verizon discontinued all AMPS service. Initially migrated to CDMA2000, but now operates on LTE and 5G.; U.S. Cellular—Formerly operated an AMPS & D-AMPS network. On February 10, 2009, U.S. Cellular discontinued all AMPS & D-AMPS service. Initially migrated to CDMA2000, but now operates on LTE and 5G.; Alltel—In 2005 disclosed that only 15% of their total customer base are still using the existing analog network. The company has posted a three-phase turn down schedule, which was completed in September 2008. With the acquisition of Western Wireless, Alltel now took the claim of the "largest network in America." The claim was true, oddly enough because of wide analog coverage in rural areas. All Alltel AMPS and D-AMPS service was discontinued in September 2008; Coastel Offshore Cellular—Operated an AMPS network in the Gulf of Mexico that stretched from south of Corpus Christi, TX to south of Gulf Shores, AL. In 2006 Coastel was the only carrier in the US whose entire customer base was still 100% analog based. In 2007 Coastel was merged with Petrocom and SOLA Communications to form Broadpoint Inc. and the network was converted to GSM.; AT&T Mobility – In areas where AT&T Mobility previously had D-AMPS operating on 1900 MHz frequencies, no analog AMPS network existed, and the D-AMPS network on the 1900 MHz frequency was shut down on July 15, 2007. Service on the remaining 850 MHz AMPS markets was discontinued along with 850 MHz D-AMPS service on February 18, 2008, except in areas where service was provided by Dobson Communications. The Dobson AMPS and TDMA networks were shut down on March 1, 2008.
Canada		1984		Bell Mobility and Telus Mobility operated AMPS networks in Canada, though they have since been overlaid with digital services. Both Bell Mobility and Telus Mobility had announced that they would observe the same shutdown guidelines as in the United States, and decommissioned their AMPS networks in 2008.; Rogers Wireless—operated an AMPS network in Canada, though it has since been overlaid with digital services. Rogers discontinued its AMPS network on May 31, 2007.; SaskTel – operated an AMPS network in Saskatchewan, Canada. It was the third-largest AMPS network, by subscribers, in the world at the time of its turndown. It was officially shutdown site by site starting at 00:00 on January 2, 2010, after twenty-one years of service. SaskTel continues to run UMTS networks.
South Korea		1984		
Indonesia		1984		
Costa Rica		1989		
Australia		1986	2000	Telstra (formerly Telecom Australia) – operated an AMPS network in Australia from February 1987 until the end of 2000. As part of the introduction of mobile phone competition in Australia, the Australian government mandated GSM as the new standard for mobile networks, and required that Telstra close the AMPS network by 2000. However, GSM base stations could only serve a limited area. While this was OK for Europe, it meant that GSM could not cover large, sparsely populated rural areas of Australia cost effectively. Telstra deployed a CDMA network, which did not suffer this limitation, and while the AMPS network was closed down at the end of 1999 in the major cities, the closure deadline was extended until the end of 2000 in rural areas to ease the transition to CDMA. The CDMA network has since been replaced by an 850 MHz UMTS network, Next G.
U.S. Virgin Islands		1986		
Israel		1986		Pelephone – began offering nationwide AMPS service in Israel in 1986. In the mid-1990s it converted to CDMA (IS-95 and later EV-DO) and in the mid-2000s converted to UMTS.
Bolivia		1991-1992		
Cayman Islands		1987		
Bermuda		1987		
Dominican Republic		1987		
Singapore		1987		Singtel (previously known as Telecommunications Equipment) – operated an AMPS network, marketed as a Cellular Mobile Radio System (CMRS), in Singapore from 1988 until 1994. In 1989, Singapore's Mass Rapid Transit (MRT) became the first rapid transit system in the world to have full mobile phone coverage inside underground stations and tunnels using AMPS technology. Singtel decommissioned its AMPS network in 1994 after GSM was implemented.
New Zealand		1987	2007	Telecom New Zealand (now Spark New Zealand) – operated an AMPS/TDMA network in New Zealand from 1987 until 2007 throughout the whole country and the network was renowned for its superb coverage, In 2000 Telecom announced that they would discontinue the AMPS network within 5 years (2005) to give customers an opportunity to transition to the CDMA2000 and later 1XRTT technologies that replaced it. They later extended that deadline until 6 pm March 31, 2007. At approximately 7:15 on March 31, 2007, the AMPS/TDMA network ceased to function.
Thailand		1987		
Bahrain		1987		
Hong Kong		1987		
Bahamas		1988		
Venezuela		1988		
Zaire		1988		
Barbados		1988		
Trinidad and Tobago		1991	2006	
Chile		1989		
Curaçao		1989		
Argentina		1989		
Antigua and Barbuda		1989		
St. Kitts and Nevis		1989		
Mexico		1989		
Netherlands Antilles		1989		
Brunei		1989		
Taiwan		1989		
Uruguay		1989		
Bangladesh		1989		
Peru		1989		
Pakistan	Paktel	1990	2004	Paktel was granted an AMPS licence in early 1990 to operate a cellular telephone network throughout Pakistan. It was the first company granted a free license to carry out cellular phone services in Pakistan. It carried out AMPS services until 2004, after which it switched to GSM.
American Samoa		1990		
Brazil		1990	2010	
Philippines		1991	~2000	
Jamaica		1991		
Malaysia	Mobikom	Jan 1994		Named Mobifon.
Kazakhstan		1994		
Uzbekistan	Uzdunrobita	1994		

== See also ==
- History of mobile phones
