= GAIT (wireless) =

Wireless standard

GAIT (an acronym for the GSM-ANSI-136 Interoperability Team) is a wireless standard developed in 1999 that allows cross-operation of mobile telephone technologies. Phones compliant with the GAIT standard can operate on either contemporary GSM networks, or the legacy IS-136 TDMA and AMPS networks found extensively throughout North America.

Since GAIT phones are interoperable over several types of networks, users could operate their phones in a much larger area of North America compared to phones that used only the GSM standard. The modern equivalent of a GAIT phone would be a GSM phone that also supports the CDMA IS-95 modes used in North America. Such phones are sometimes called "world phones," although this phrase is also used to describe a GSM phone that supports all four frequency bands used throughout the world.

== Implementation ==
A GAIT-compliant mobile phone typically accepts a SIM card, similar to a standard GSM phone; however, depending on the wireless provider, the SIM card enables access not only to that wireless provider's GSM network, but also enables use of the telephone on any TDMA or AMPS networks run by the wireless provider. In addition to the usual IMEI found on standard GSM mobile phones, a GAIT-compliant mobile phone also includes an AMPS-style ESN unique to the mobile phone.

In the United States, Cingular Wireless (now AT&T Mobility) offered the Nokia 6340 and Sony Ericsson T62u to customers who wished to have a GAIT mobile phone (although these phones are no longer marketed through AT&T). An update to the Nokia 6340, the Nokia 6340i, added GSM 850 support and was also carried by Cingular. The Nokia 6340 was also offered by Canadian provider Fido Solutions. The version sold by Fido was unique in that it was used solely for analog roaming, with the IS-136 "TDMA" portion of the phone disabled. Fido discontinued the phone upon their acquisition by Rogers Wireless, which allowed access to Rogers' extensive GSM network that already overlaid the existing analog networks in Canada. Rogers Wireless, meanwhile, never offered a GAIT solution to customers, as their entire IS-136 TDMA and AMPS networks were overlaid with GSM by the time the service was launched.

== See also ==
- Dual-mode mobile
