= Motorola bag phone =

Colloquial name for a line of Motorola cellphones

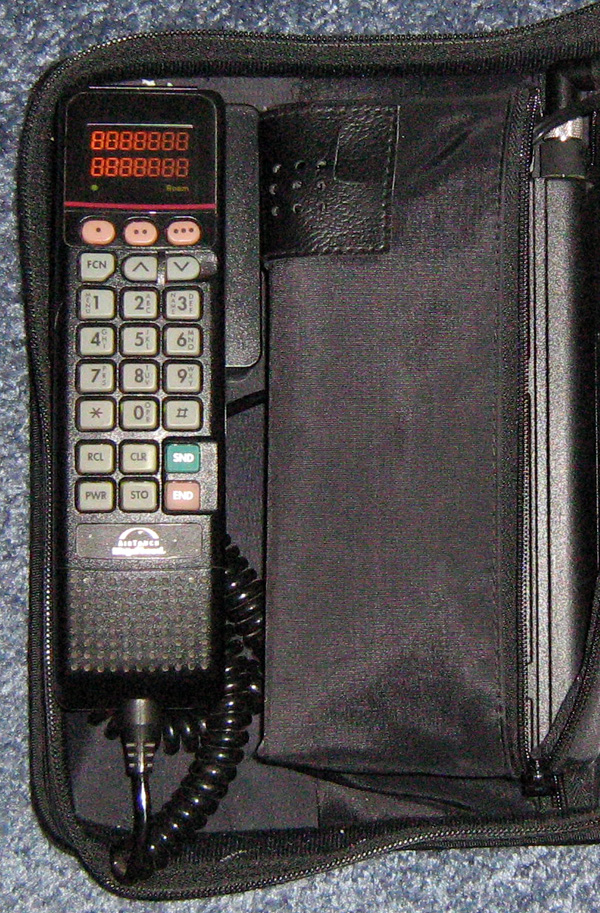
Motorola 2950 Special Edition bag phone, with 2-line display

"Motorola bag phone" is the colloquial name for a line of personal transportable cellular telephones manufactured by Motorola, Inc., from 1988 to 2000.

== Description ==
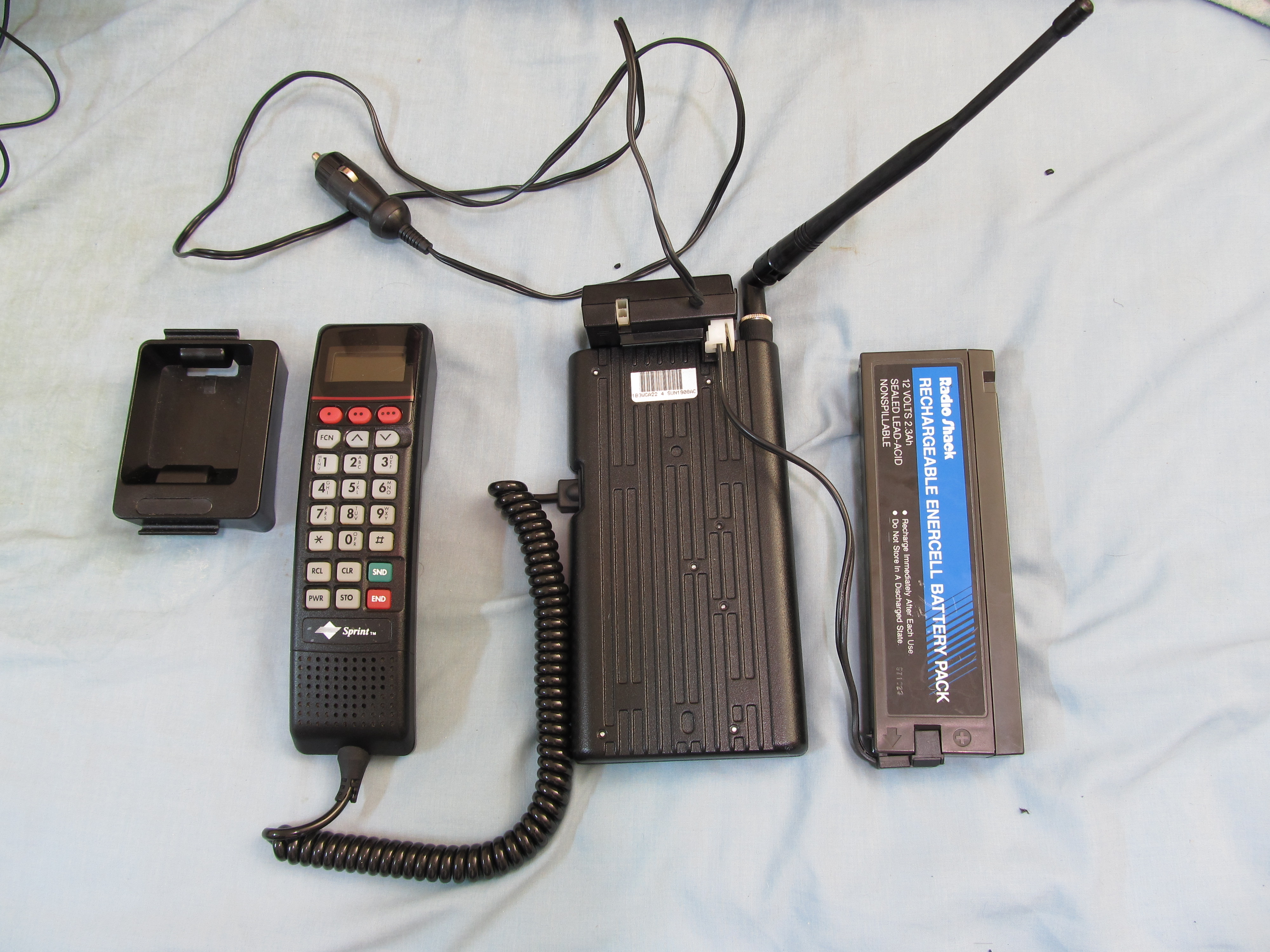
A Motorola 2900 "bagless" bag phone which has been removed from its bag, illustrating how the parts, including the optional battery pack, interconnect. At the far left is the handset hang-up cup, which does not electrically connect to the phone.

Motorola introduced their first bag phones in 1988. These phones offered more durability and higher power output (up to 3 watts) than more conventional cell phones of the time, such as Motorola's own DynaTAC and MicroTAC handheld phones, making them popular for truckers, boaters, and people in rural areas. Because of their durability, many examples of these phones are still in working order today.

The bag phones are a derivative of the Motorola Tough Talker series of transportable phones, which in turn descended from the DynaTAC car phones introduced in 1984. All of these phones feature a modular design in which the handset attaches to the transceiver, which is then powered by either a vehicle's power system (in the car phones) or a battery pack (in the transportables). By reducing the size and weight of the transceiver and battery pack, and introducing more fashionable bags (originally nylon on the earliest models, but changed to leather in about 1990 or so) in which to contain them, Motorola was able to make them more marketable to the average cellular phone consumer, and hence the "bag phone".

The handset consists of a digital numeric or alphanumeric display with Pwr (indicating the phone is turned on; indicated by a dot in some models), InUse (indicating that a call is in progress), NoSvc (cannot receive a cellular signal and is unable to make or receive calls), and Roam (accessing a cellular system other than your home system) indicators, a numeric keypad with other buttons for different functions (depending on the model), and a loudspeaker for the ringer and hands-free use. This plugs into the transceiver, which also houses connections for a removable "rubber duck" antenna, and the power supply header which plugs into a 12 volt automotive outlet and an optional 12 volt sealed lead-acid battery. The battery provides up to 2.5 hours of talk time and 48 hours of standby time. All of these parts are put together in a specially designed bag made by either Caseworks, Inc. of Chicago, Illinois, or Service Manufacturing Corporation of Aurora, Illinois. These phones can also be permanently installed in a car. The only bag phone to deviate from this architecture was the Power PAK, which placed the controls and display on the transceiver and used an LED display similar to that used in some DynaTAC and MicroTAC phones.

== Obsolescence ==
The majority of bag phones operated on the AMPS network, and a few special models produced in the late 1990s, dubbed the Digital Concert Series, ran on the TDMA network, in addition to AMPS. Because both the AMPS and TDMA networks are extinct as of February 2008, the service life of all Motorola bag phones have come to an end, and they now serve only as a collector's item.

The original Motorola bag phone has been succeeded by the Motorola M800 and M900 bag phones, introduced in 2005. While they are technologically dissimilar to the original bag phones and use an entirely different user interface, the M800 and M900 support CDMA and GSM, respectively, and add the basic features of modern cell phones. Additionally, they are backwards compatible with batteries for the original bag phones.

== Design features ==
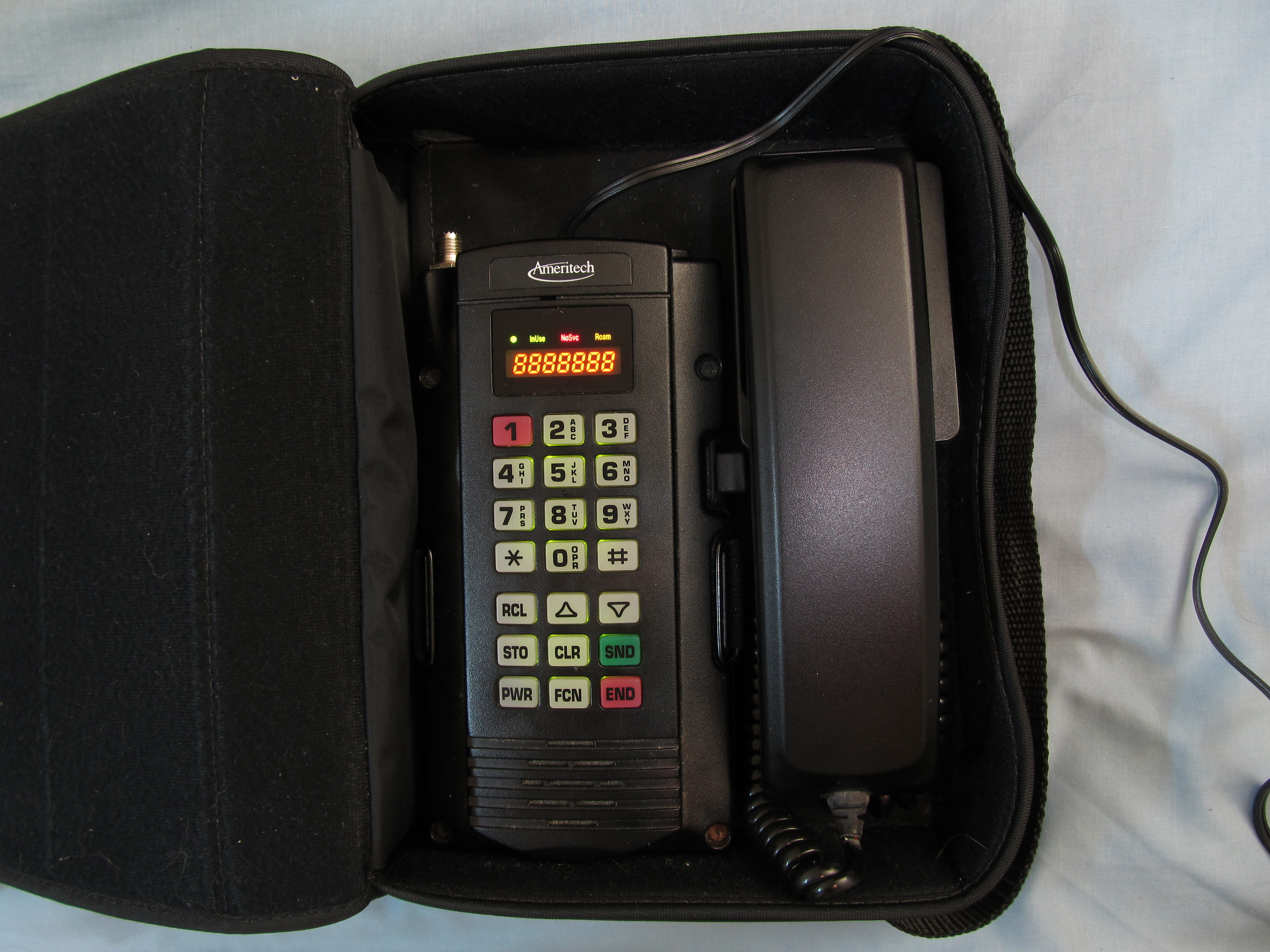
The Motorola Power PAK bag phone positioned the controls and display on the transceiver instead of the handset; a design which was carried over to the current M-series digital bag phones.

Although they are technically all similar, Motorola produced many different models of the bag phone, differing in features and display type. These can be determined by the model number on the underside of the handset, beginning with SCN (TLN on early models). Each type of handset also had its own transceiver, marked with a model number beginning with SUN. Random handsets can be used with random transceivers, but some mismatches may result in unusable functions. For example, plugging a 4500 handset into a 3 Button transceiver will result in the Up/Down, one-touch, VOL and STO buttons to be either unusable or perform a totally different function. Some transceivers will detect a mismatched handset, and display "LOANER" upon power-up.

=== Display ===
Most handsets utilized a monochrome LCD capable of displaying 7 or 10 digits, with green or orange LED backlighting. The better featured handsets used a 7 digit alphanumeric display, and offered a color LCD as an option.

The color LCD utilized the colors orange for the alphanumeric display area (red on the Digital Concert Series), green for the power and InUse indicators, red for the NoSvc indicator, and yellow for the Roam indicator. While the color display was more attractive, it has a few downsides. An incandescent lamp is used for backlighting, which not only draws more power, thus reducing battery life in a portable application, but has a definite lifespan. In addition, the display can be hard to read in sunlight, and when the backlight extinguishes during battery operated use, the indicators become nearly invisible.

The America Series 820 and Power PAK bag phone models used an LED display.

=== Carry case ===
Motorola bag phones were sold in several types of carry cases ("bags"), with each model being available with one or two types. The earliest bag phones, which used a large transceiver similar to that used in the Tough Talker transportable phone, came in a large upright case, in which the transceiver and battery (if applicable) sat in the bottom of the case, with the handset and hang-up cup assembly placed on top. Later bag phones were available in a smaller upright case, which also contained a side pocket where the battery could be placed.

Other cases available included the Soft-PAK, which houses the transceiver and battery in a large pocket beside the handset, and the Attaché Carry Case, which in addition to a setup similar to the Soft-PAK, contains several pockets for accessories such as a pen, day planner, and the phone's included documentation.

The Dynasty, Meteor, Pulsar, Ambassador II, and America Series AMS833 phones were all available in a unique case which contained a setup similar to the Soft-PAK, and a single pocket on the exterior of the case, and the name of the phone stitched into the case. The Power PAK phone came in a unique case similar to the Soft-PAK, with an external zippered pocket in which to contain the battery.

== Model list ==
Model	Handset part number	Display type	Function keys	Notes
	TLN2777A	7-digit LED	PWR, END, SND, Volume/Control	Very early bag phone (1988). Uses same handset as the Motorola DynaTAC 2000X. Very basic functions, with no battery-life meter, signal-strength meter, or lock capability. Uses very early lever-action hang-up cup.
Pulsar 2000	SCN2165A	7-digit LED	PWR, END, SND, Volume/Control	Early bag phone. Uses same handset the DynaTAC 2000X, except gray in color.
3 Button	SCN2194A SCN2398A SCN2453A SCN2383A	7 digit numeric monochrome LCD	PWR, END/CLR, SND, Volume/Control	The most basic bag phone. Volume/Control button on side of handset allows adjusting loudspeaker and ringer volume and accessing other features. The less-common SCN2383A model is white in color, instead of the usual black.
Dynasty	SCN2390A	10 digit numeric monochrome LCD	PWR, END/CLR, SND, VOL/CTL	VOL/CTL button is moved to main button area
Meteor	SCN2394A	10 digit numeric monochrome LCD	PWR, END/CLR, SND, VOL/CTL	Similar to Dynasty. Handset is grey and charcoal in color.
Pulsar	SCN2387A	10 digit numeric monochrome LCD	PWR, END/CLR, SND, VOL/CTL	Similar to Dynasty. Handset is grey in color.
SE Plus	SCN2544A	10 digit numeric monochrome LCD; 10 digit LED	PWR, END/CLR, SND, VOL/CTL	Similar to Dynasty. Handset is white in color.
Ambassador II	SCN2209A SCN2473A	7 digit numeric monochrome LCD; 10 digit monochrome LCD	PWR, END/CLR, SND; PWR, END/CLR, SND, VOL/CTL	SCN2209A model is similar to 3 Button, SCN2473A model is similar to Dynasty. Grey and black in color.
Genesis	SCN2473A	10 digit monochrome LCD	PWR, END/CLR, SND, VOL/CTL	Similar to SCN2473A Ambassador II.
America Series 815	SCN2392A	10 digit numeric monochrome LCD	PWR, END/CLR, SND, VOL/CTL	Similar to 3 Button. Handset is grey in color.
America Series 820	SCN2174A	10 digit LED	PWR, END, SND, CTL, RCL, Volume	Grey handset with volume button on side. Aside from handset color, this handset is identical to that used in the Motorola DynaTAC 4500L car phone.
America Series AMS833	SCN2476B	10 digit numeric monochrome LCD	PWR, END/CLR, SND, VOL/CTL	Similar to Pulsar.
Soft-PAK	SCN2497B SCN2498B SCN2744A SCN2745A SCN2533A	7 digit numeric monochrome LCD	PWR, END/CLR, SND, RCL, FCN, VOL; PWR, END/CLR, SND, RCL, STO, FCN	RCL button recalls stored phone numbers and other information, and STO button stores information into memory and sets options in the feature menu. CTL button is renamed FCN and separated from VOL. Besides the four mainstream models, there was also a less-common SCN2533A model, which had a white handset and grey bag.
4000	SCN2800AA	7 digit monochrome LCD	PWR, END/CLR, SND, RCL, VOL, FCN	Similar to Soft-PAK.
Series III	SCN2395A	10 digit numeric monochrome LCD	PWR, END/CLR, SND, RCL, STO, FCN	Similar to Soft-PAK.
Series III 6 Button	SCN2607B SCN2396A	7 digit numeric monochrome LCD	PWR, END/CLR, SND, RCL, STO, FCN	Similar to Soft-PAK. This handset was used in the Tough Talker transportable phone.
480	SCN2532A SCN2705A SCN2449A SCN2555A SCN2552A	7 digit alphanumeric monochrome LCD; 7 digit alphanumeric color LCD	PWR, END, SND, RCL, STO, FCN, CLR, MSG, Up, Down	One of the most well-featured bag phones. Differences between the five models are cosmetic and button placement. MSG checks missed calls, up and down buttons scroll through stored phone numbers and menu items, and adjust volume. An alphanumeric display replaces the standard numeric display, allowing name tags to be entered with stored phone numbers, and easier reading of messages the phone displays.
2800	SCN4057AB SCN2742A	7 digit alphanumeric monochrome LCD	PWR, END, SND, RCL, STO, FCN, CLR, MSG, Up, Down	Similar to 480.
2800DLD	SCN2766A	14 digit alphanumeric color LCD	PWR, END, SND, RCL, STO, FCN, CLR, MSG, Up, Down	2800 with dual-line color LCD.
4500	SCN2801AB SCN2772A	7 digit alphanumeric monochrome LCD	Power, End, Send, Recall, Store, Function, Clear, Up, Down, three Once-Touch Dial keys	One of the most well-featured bag phones. One-Touch Dial keys allow dialing numbers with the touch of one button. Button functions are spelled out instead of abbreviated.
4500S		7 digit alphanumeric monochrome LCD	PWR, END, SND, RCL, STO, FCN, CLR, MSG, Up, Down	Similar to 480.
2900	SCN2462A SCN2520A SCN2500A SCN2501A SCN2594A	7 digit alphanumeric monochrome LCD; 7 digit alphanumeric color LCD	PWR, END, SND, RCL, STO, FCN, CLR, Up, Down, three Turbo Dial keys	Similar to 4500 aside from some omitted features and cosmetic differences. SCN2500A model has color LCD. SCN2594A model has a white and grey handset, and a color LCD. SCN2501A model was specially designed for Bell Atlantic Mobile, and has a *BAM hot key in place of one of the Turbo Dial keys, and color LCD.
Gold Series	SCN2499A	7 digit alphanumeric color LCD	PWR, END, SND, RCL, STO, FCN, CLR, MSG, Up, Down, two Turbo Dial keys	Similar to 2900, aside from cosmetic differences, and MSG key in place of one of the Turbo Dial keys.
2950 Special Edition	SCN2463A	14 digit alphanumeric color LCD	PWR, END, SND, RCL, STO, FCN, CLR, Up, Down, three Turbo Dial keys	Similar to 2900, but with dual-line color LCD.
Digital Concert Series		7 digit alphanumeric monochrome LCD; 7 digit alphanumeric color LCD	PWR, END, SND, RCL, STO, FCN, CLR, MSG, Up, Down	Similar to 480, but with TDMA compatibility, in addition to AMPS.
Power PAK	SCN4044A	7 digit LED	PWR, END, SND, RCL, STO, FCN, CLR, Up, Down	Deviates from the standard bag phone architecture by placing the controls and display on the transceiver, and utilizing an LED display similar to that used on the MicroTAC DPC 550.

== Gallery ==
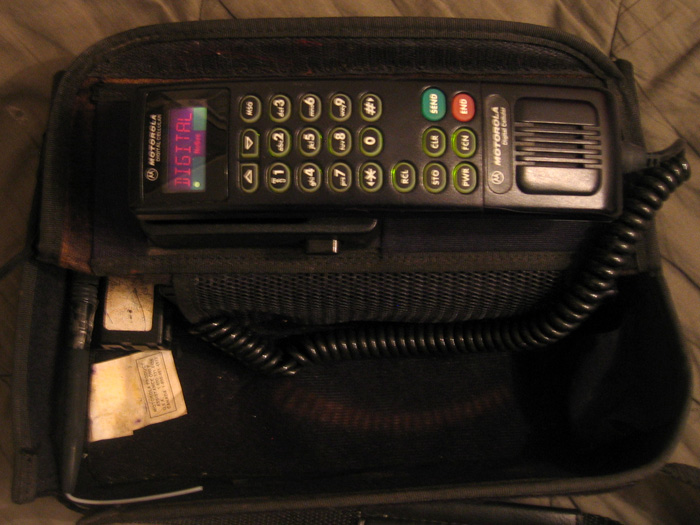
Motorola Digital Concert bag phone with color LCD, in upright bag.

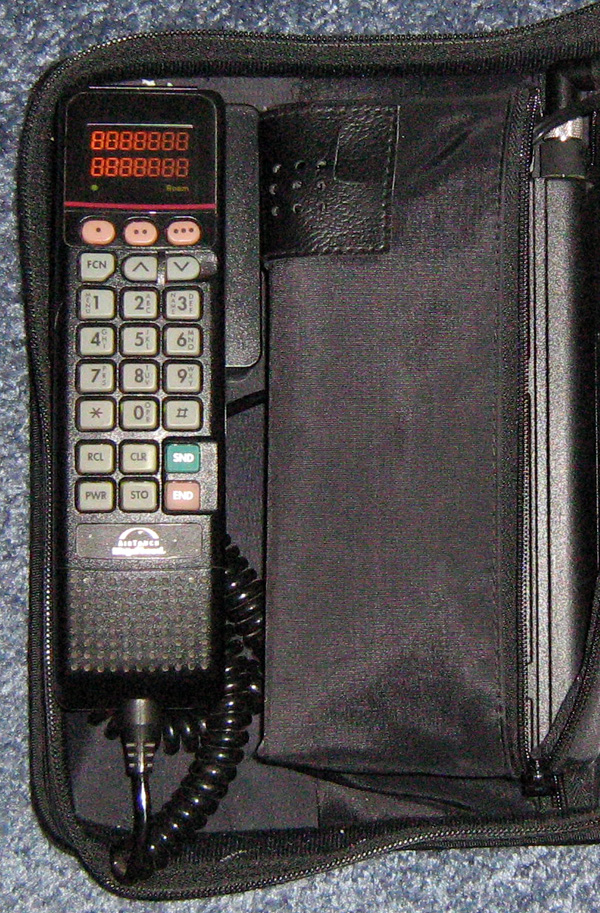
Motorola 2950 Special Edition bag phone, in Attaché Carry Case.

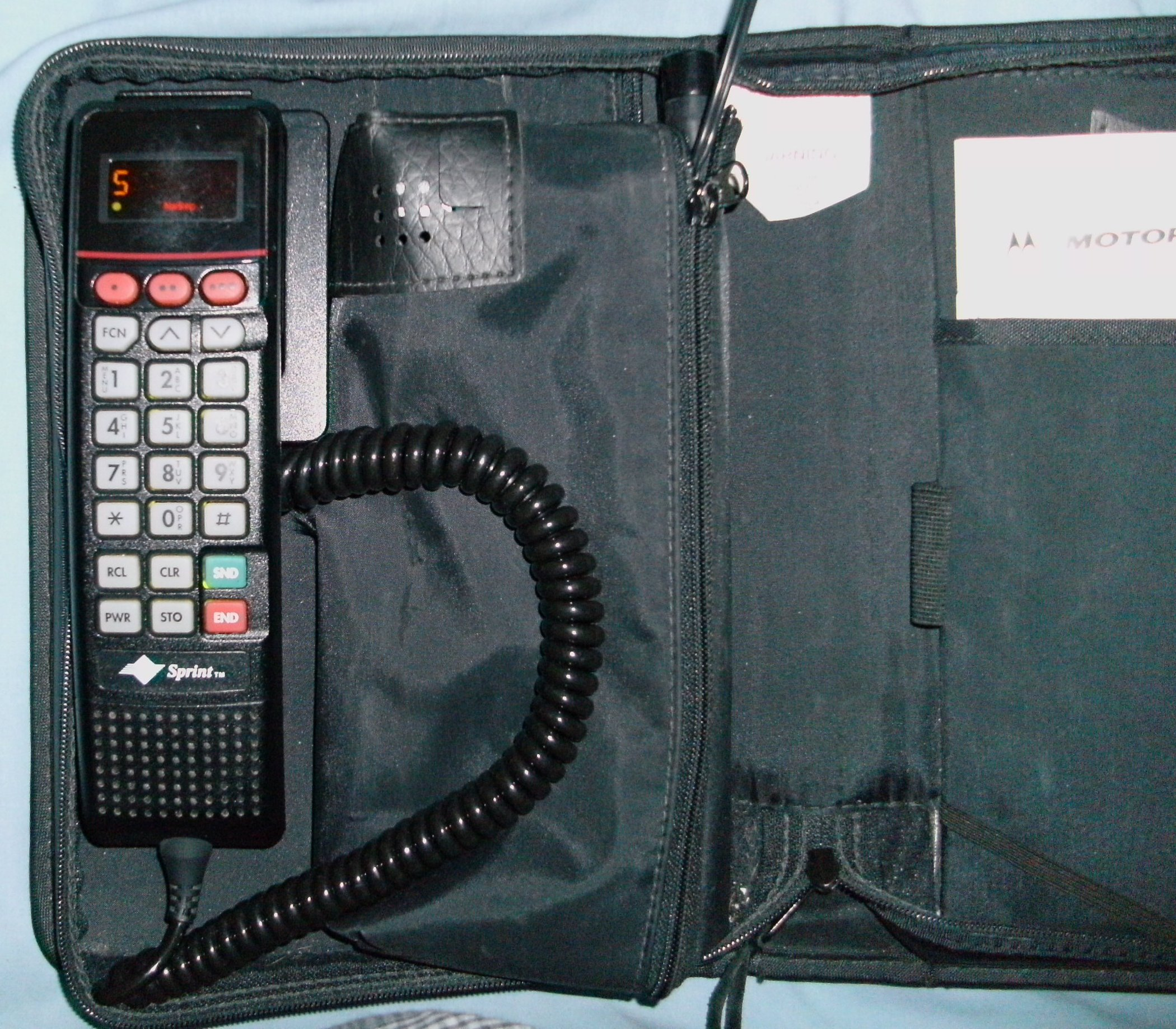
Motorola 2900 bag phone with color LCD, in Attaché Carry Case.

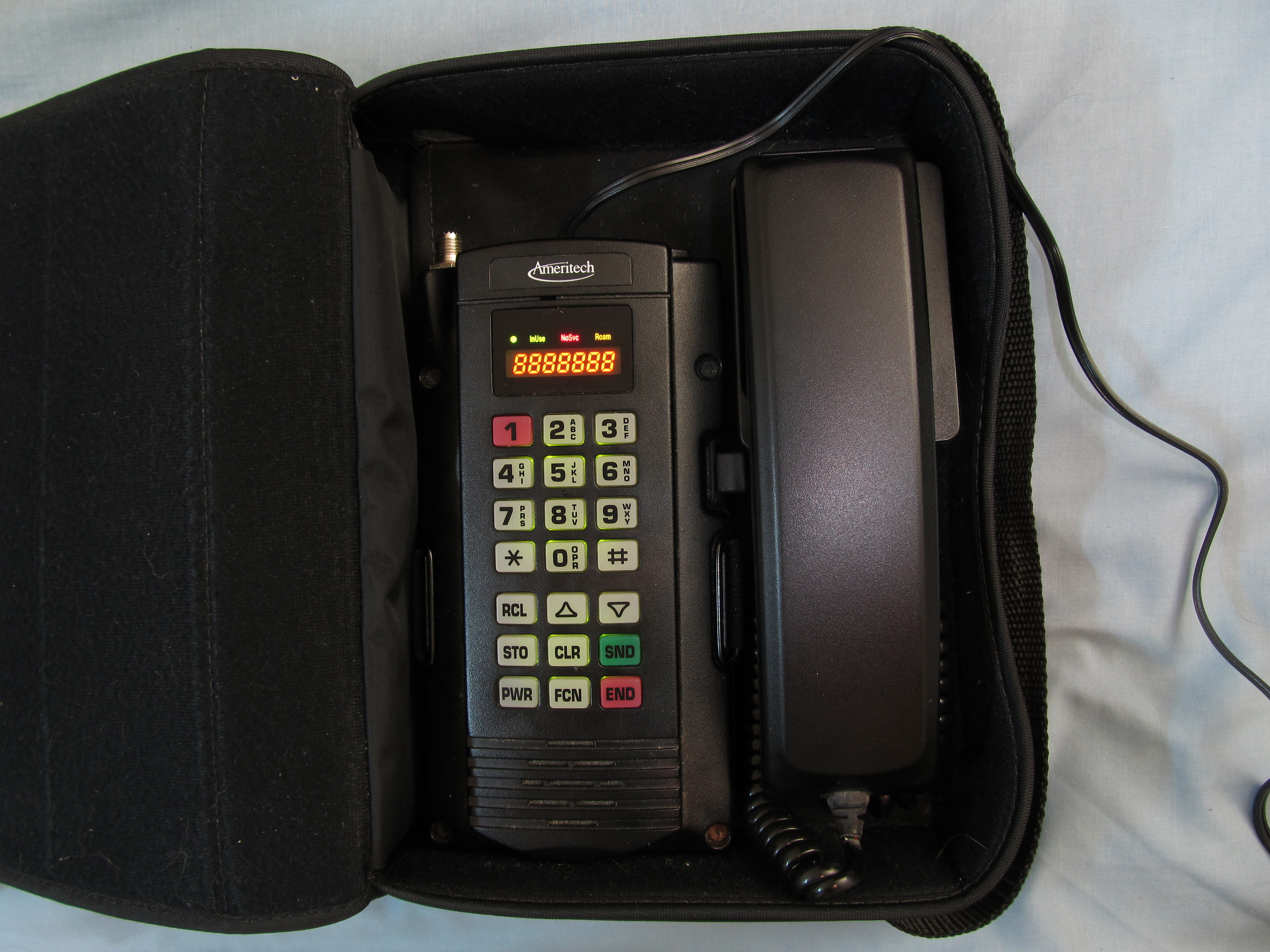
Motorola Power PAK bag phone.

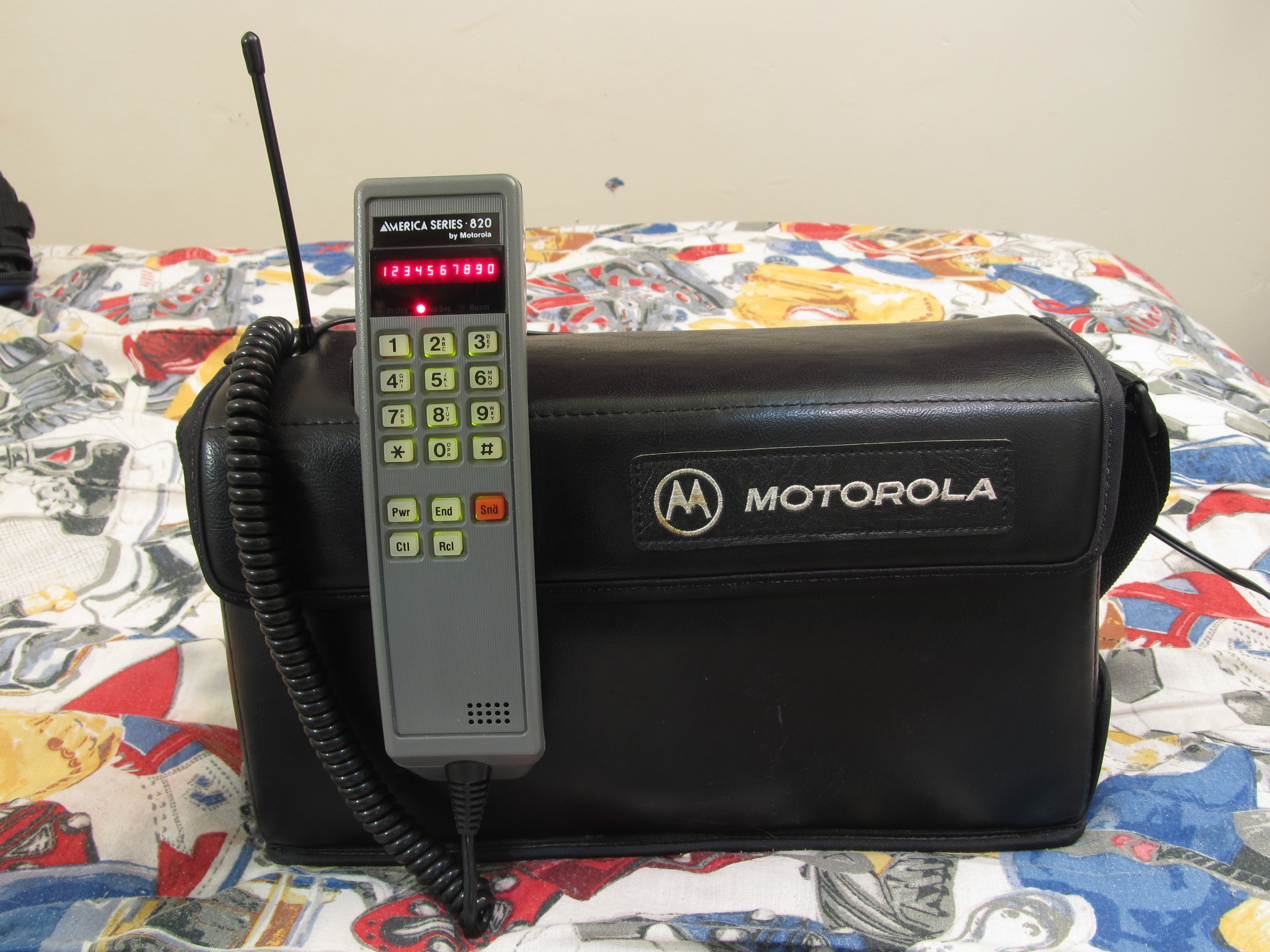
Motorola America Series 820 bag phone.
