= Dual-mode mobile =

Type of mobile phones

Dual-mode mobiles refer to mobile phones that are compatible with more than one form of data transmission or network.

== Dual-mode phone ==
A dual-mode phone is a telephone which uses more than one technique for sending and receiving voice and data. This could be for wireless mobile phones or for wired phones.

There are three types of dual-mode phones.

=== Network compatibility ===
Mobile phones containing two types of cellular radios for voice and data. These phones include combination of GSM and CDMA technology. They can be used as a GSM or CDMA phone according to the user's preference. These handsets are also called global phones. An example of this is the Samsung SCH-A790.

These dual-mode handsets are compatible with both GSM and CDMA networks and are essentially two phones in one device.

Such phones make sense in those countries that have both GSM & CDMA networks or international CDMA roamers who want to keep a single handset with two numbers on it.

Most dual-mode handsets require two identifying cards (one SIM and one RUIM), though some dual-mode phones (for example, the iPhone 4S) only require one SIM and one ESN. Not all dual SIM handsets are dual mode (for example dual SIM GSM phones).

=== Cellular and non-cellular radios ===
Mobile phones contain both cellular and non-cellular radios used for voice and data communication. There are also two types of dual-mode phones which use cellular radio which will contain GSM/CDMA/W-CDMA as well as other technology like IEEE 802.11 (Wi-Fi) radio or DECT (Digital Enhanced Cordless Telecommunications) radio. These phones can be used as cellular phones when connected to a wide area cellular network. When within range of a suitable WiFi or DECT network, the phone can be used as a WiFi/DECT phone for all communications purposes. This method of operation can reduce cost (for both the network operator and the subscriber), improve indoor coverage and increase data access speeds.

=== Wired phones ===
Wired phones with VoIP and POTS technology. These phones can be used for making VoIP calls and also used for phones on the circuit switch network. These phones require compatible routers and modem to make VoIP calls.

== List ==
- Google Pixel & Pixel XL
- Google Pixel 2 & Pixel 2 XL
- iPhone 6s
- Motorola Moto X4 and Android One Moto X4
- Nexus 5
- Nexus 5X
- Nexus 6P

== See also ==
- GAIT

Dual-mode mobiles could also refer to:

- GSM & WiFi phones using VoIP
- Analog & Digital handsets
- Fixed & Mobile devices (FMC)
