= Data Coding Scheme =

Online messaging standard

Data Coding Scheme is a one-octet field in Short Messages (SM) and Cell Broadcast Messages (CB) which carries a basic information how the recipient handset should process the received message. The information includes:

- the character set or message coding, which determines the encoding of the message user data
- the message class, which determines to which component of the Mobile Station (MS) or User Equipment (UE) the message should be delivered
- the request to automatically delete the message after reading
- the state of flags indicating presence of unread voicemail, fax, e-mail or other messages
- the indication that the message content is compressed
- the language of the cell broadcast message

The field is described in 3GPP 23.040 and 3GPP 23.038 under the name TP-DCS.

== Message character sets ==
A special 7-bit encoding called the GSM 7 bit default alphabet was designed for the Short Message System in GSM. The alphabet contains the most-often used symbols from most Western-European languages (and some Greek uppercase letters). Some ASCII characters and the Euro sign did not fit into the GSM 7-bit default alphabet and must be encoded using two septets. These characters form GSM 7 bit default alphabet extension table. Support of the GSM 7-bit alphabet is mandatory for GSM handsets and network elements.

Languages which use Latin script, but use characters which are not present in the GSM 7-bit default alphabet, often replace missing characters with diacritic marks with corresponding characters without diacritics, which causes not entirely satisfactory user experience, but is often accepted. In order to include these missing characters the 16-bit UTF-16 (in GSM called UCS-2) encoding may be used at the price of reducing the length of a (non-segmented) message from 160 to 70 characters.

The messages in Chinese, Korean or Japanese languages must be encoded using the UTF-16 character encoding. The same was also true for other languages using non-Latin scripts like Russian, Arabic, Hebrew and various Indian languages. In 3GPP TS 23.038 8.0.0 published in 2008 a new feature, an extended National language shift table was introduced, which in the version 11.0.0 published in 2012 covers Turkish, Spanish, Portuguese, Bengali, Gujarati, Hindi, Kannada, Malayalam, Oriya, Punjabi, Tamil, Telugu and Urdu languages. The mechanism replaces GSM 7-bit default alphabet code table and/or extended table with a national table(s) according to special information elements in User Data Header. The non-segmented message using national language shift table(s) may carry up to 155 (or 153) 7-bit characters.

GSM recognizes only two encodings for text messages and one encoding for binary messages:

- GSM 7-bit default alphabet (which includes using of National language shift tables as well)
- UCS-2
- 8-bit data

== Message classes ==
The TP-DCS octet has a complex syntax to allow carrying of other information; the most notable are message classes:

Message Classes
Value	Message Class
0 0	0 - Flash messages
0 1	1 - ME-specific
1 0	2 - SIM / USIM specific
1 1	3 - TE-specific

Flash messages are received by a mobile phone even though it has full memory. They are not stored in the phone, they just displayed on the phone display.

== Other features ==
=== Automatic deletion after reading ===
The handset should delete any message received with a TP-DCS value falling to the "Message Marked for Automatic Deletion Coding Group" after user has read it.

=== Message waiting indication ===
Message Waiting Indication group of DCS values serves to set or reset flags indicating presence of unread voicemail, fax, e-mail or other messages.

=== Data compression ===
A special DCS value also allows message compression, but it perhaps is not used by any operator.

== DCS values ==
=== SMS data coding scheme ===
The values of TP-DCS are defined in GSM recommendation 03.38.

Coding Group: General Data Coding
DCS hex dec		Character Set	Message Class	Compressed	Reserved Because
00	0	GSM 7 bit	Default	-	
01	1	GSM 7 bit	Default	-	Bits 1 and 0 have value 1 but no message class present
02	2	GSM 7 bit	Default	-	Bits 1 and 0 have value 2 but no message class present
03	3	GSM 7 bit	Default	-	Bits 1 and 0 have value 3 but no message class present
04	4	8 bit data	Default	-	
05	5	8 bit data	Default	-	Bits 1 and 0 have value 1 but no message class present
06	6	8 bit data	Default	-	Bits 1 and 0 have value 2 but no message class present
07	7	8 bit data	Default	-	Bits 1 and 0 have value 3 but no message class present
08	8	UCS2	Default	-	
09	9	UCS2	Default	-	Bits 1 and 0 have value 1 but no message class present
0A	10	UCS2	Default	-	Bits 1 and 0 have value 2 but no message class present
0B	11	UCS2	Default	-	Bits 1 and 0 have value 3 but no message class present
0C	12	(reserved)	Default	-	Reserved character set
0D	13	(reserved)	Default	-	Reserved character set Bits 1 and 0 have value 1 but no message class present
0E	14	(reserved)	Default	-	Reserved character set Bits 1 and 0 have value 2 but no message class present
0F	15	(reserved)	Default	-	Reserved character set Bits 1 and 0 have value 3 but no message class present
10	16	GSM 7 bit	Class 0 (Flash message)	-	
11	17	GSM 7 bit	Class 1 (ME-specific)	-	
12	18	GSM 7 bit	Class 2 (SIM/USIM-specific)	-	
13	19	GSM 7 bit	Class 3 (TE-specific)	-	
14	20	8 bit data	Class 0 (Flash message)	-	
15	21	8 bit data	Class 1 (ME-specific)	-	
16	22	8 bit data	Class 2 (SIM/USIM-specific)	-	
17	23	8 bit data	Class 3 (TE-specific)	-	
18	24	UCS2	Class 0 (Flash message)	-	
19	25	UCS2	Class 1 (ME-specific)	-	
1A	26	UCS2	Class 2 (SIM/USIM-specific)	-	
1B	27	UCS2	Class 3 (TE-specific)	-	
1C	28	(reserved)	Class 0 (Flash message)	-	Reserved character set
1D	29	(reserved)	Class 1 (ME-specific)	-	Reserved character set
1E	30	(reserved)	Class 2 (SIM/USIM-specific)	-	Reserved character set
1F	31	(reserved)	Class 3 (TE-specific)	-	Reserved character set
20	32	GSM 7 bit	Default	+	
21	33	GSM 7 bit	Default	+	Bits 1 and 0 have value 1 but no message class present
22	34	GSM 7 bit	Default	+	Bits 1 and 0 have value 2 but no message class present
23	35	GSM 7 bit	Default	+	Bits 1 and 0 have value 3 but no message class present
24	36	8 bit data	Default	+	Compression set but Character set can't be compressed
25	37	8 bit data	Default	+	Compression set but Character set can't be compressed Bits 1 and 0 have value 1 but no message class present
26	38	8 bit data	Default	+	Compression set but Character set can't be compressed Bits 1 and 0 have value 2 but no message class present
27	39	8 bit data	Default	+	Compression set but Character set can't be compressed Bits 1 and 0 have value 3 but no message class present
28	40	UCS2	Default	+	Compression set but Character set can't be compressed
29	41	UCS2	Default	+	Compression set but Character set can't be compressed Bits 1 and 0 have value 1 but no message class present
2A	42	UCS2	Default	+	Compression set but Character set can't be compressed Bits 1 and 0 have value 2 but no message class present
2B	43	UCS2	Default	+	Compression set but Character set can't be compressed Bits 1 and 0 have value 3 but no message class present
2C	44	(reserved)	Default	+	Reserved character set
2D	45	(reserved)	Default	+	Reserved character set Bits 1 and 0 have value 1 but no message class present
2E	46	(reserved)	Default	+	Reserved character set Bits 1 and 0 have value 1 but no message class present
2F	47	(reserved)	Default	+	Reserved character set Bits 1 and 0 have value 1 but no message class present
30	48	GSM 7 bit	Class 0 (Flash message)	+	
31	49	GSM 7 bit	Class 1 (ME-specific)	+	
32	50	GSM 7 bit	Class 2 (SIM/USIM-specific)	+	
33	51	GSM 7 bit	Class 3 (TE-specific)	+	
34	52	8 bit data	Class 0 (Flash message)	+	Compression set but Character set can't be compressed
35	53	8 bit data	Class 1 (ME-specific)	+	Compression set but Character set can't be compressed
36	54	8 bit data	Class 2 (SIM/USIM-specific)	+	Compression set but Character set can't be compressed
37	55	8 bit data	Class 3 (TE-specific)	+	Compression set but Character set can't be compressed
38	56	UCS2	Class 0 (Flash message)	+	Compression set but Character set can't be compressed
39	57	UCS2	Class 1 (ME-specific)	+	Compression set but Character set can't be compressed
3A	58	UCS2	Class 2 (SIM/USIM-specific)	+	Compression set but Character set can't be compressed
3B	59	UCS2	Class 3 (TE-specific)	+	Compression set but Character set can't be compressed
3C	60	(reserved)	Class 0 (Flash message)	+	Reserved character set
3D	61	(reserved)	Class 1 (ME-specific)	+	Reserved character set
3E	62	(reserved)	Class 2 (SIM/USIM-specific)	+	Reserved character set
3F	63	(reserved)	Class 3 (TE-specific)	+	Reserved character set
Coding Group: Message Marked for Automatic Deletion
DCS hex dec		Character Set	Message Class	Compressed	Reserved Because
40	64	GSM 7 bit	Default	-	
41	65	GSM 7 bit	Default	-	Bits 1 and 0 have value 1 but no message class present
42	66	GSM 7 bit	Default	-	Bits 1 and 0 have value 2 but no message class present
43	67	GSM 7 bit	Default	-	Bits 1 and 0 have value 3 but no message class present
44	68	8 bit data	Default	-	
45	69	8 bit data	Default	-	Bits 1 and 0 have value 1 but no message class present
46	70	8 bit data	Default	-	Bits 1 and 0 have value 2 but no message class present
47	71	8 bit data	Default	-	Bits 1 and 0 have value 3 but no message class present
48	72	UCS2	Default	-	
49	73	UCS2	Default	-	Bits 1 and 0 have value 1 but no message class present
4A	74	UCS2	Default	-	Bits 1 and 0 have value 2 but no message class present
4B	75	UCS2	Default	-	Bits 1 and 0 have value 3 but no message class present
4C	76	(reserved)	Default	-	Reserved character set
4D	77	(reserved)	Default	-	Reserved character set Bits 1 and 0 have value 1 but no message class present
4E	78	(reserved)	Default	-	Reserved character set Bits 1 and 0 have value 2 but no message class present
4F	79	(reserved)	Default	-	Reserved character set Bits 1 and 0 have value 3 but no message class present
50	80	GSM 7 bit	Class 0 (Flash message)	-	
51	81	GSM 7 bit	Class 1 (ME-specific)	-	
52	82	GSM 7 bit	Class 2 (SIM/USIM-specific)	-	
53	83	GSM 7 bit	Class 3 (TE-specific)	-	
54	84	8 bit data	Class 0 (Flash message)	-	
55	85	8 bit data	Class 1 (ME-specific)	-	
56	86	8 bit data	Class 2 (SIM/USIM-specific)	-	
57	87	8 bit data	Class 3 (TE-specific)	-	
58	88	UCS2	Class 0 (Flash message)	-	
59	89	UCS2	Class 1 (ME-specific)	-	
5A	90	UCS2	Class 2 (SIM/USIM-specific)	-	
5B	91	UCS2	Class 3 (TE-specific)	-	
5C	92	(reserved)	Class 0 (Flash message)	-	Reserved character set
5D	93	(reserved)	Class 1 (ME-specific)	-	Reserved character set
5E	94	(reserved)	Class 2 (SIM/USIM-specific)	-	Reserved character set
5F	95	(reserved)	Class 3 (TE-specific)	-	Reserved character set
60	96	GSM 7 bit	Default	+	
61	97	GSM 7 bit	Default	+	Bits 1 and 0 have value 1 but no message class present
62	98	GSM 7 bit	Default	+	Bits 1 and 0 have value 2 but no message class present
63	99	GSM 7 bit	Default	+	Bits 1 and 0 have value 3 but no message class present
64	100	8 bit data	Default	+	Compression set but Character set can't be compressed
65	101	8 bit data	Default	+	Compression set but Character set can't be compressed Bits 1 and 0 have value 1 but no message class present
66	102	8 bit data	Default	+	Compression set but Character set can't be compressed Bits 1 and 0 have value 2 but no message class present
67	103	8 bit data	Default	+	Compression set but Character set can't be compressed Bits 1 and 0 have value 3 but no message class present
68	104	UCS2	Default	+	Compression set but Character set can't be compressed
69	105	UCS2	Default	+	Compression set but Character set can't be compressed Bits 1 and 0 have value 1 but no message class present
6A	106	UCS2	Default	+	Compression set but Character set can't be compressed Bits 1 and 0 have value 2 but no message class present
6B	107	UCS2	Default	+	Compression set but Character set can't be compressed Bits 1 and 0 have value 3 but no message class present
6C	108	(reserved)	Default	+	Reserved character set
6D	109	(reserved)	Default	+	Reserved character set Bits 1 and 0 have value 1 but no message class present
6E	110	(reserved)	Default	+	Reserved character set Bits 1 and 0 have value 2 but no message class present
6F	111	(reserved)	Default	+	Reserved character set Bits 1 and 0 have value 3 but no message class present
70	112	GSM 7 bit	Class 0 (Flash message)	+	
71	113	GSM 7 bit	Class 1 (ME-specific)	+	
72	114	GSM 7 bit	Class 2 (SIM/USIM-specific)	+	
73	115	GSM 7 bit	Class 3 (TE-specific)	+	
74	116	8 bit data	Class 0 (Flash message)	+	Compression set but Character set can't be compressed
75	117	8 bit data	Class 1 (ME-specific)	+	Compression set but Character set can't be compressed
76	118	8 bit data	Class 2 (SIM/USIM-specific)	+	Compression set but Character set can't be compressed
77	119	8 bit data	Class 3 (TE-specific)	+	Compression set but Character set can't be compressed
78	120	UCS2	Class 0 (Flash message)	+	Compression set but Character set can't be compressed
79	121	UCS2	Class 1 (ME-specific)	+	Compression set but Character set can't be compressed
7A	122	UCS2	Class 2 (SIM/USIM-specific)	+	Compression set but Character set can't be compressed
7B	123	UCS2	Class 3 (TE-specific)	+	Compression set but Character set can't be compressed
7C	124	(reserved)	Class 0 (Flash message)	+	Reserved character set
7D	125	(reserved)	Class 1 (ME-specific)	+	Reserved character set
7E	126	(reserved)	Class 2 (SIM/USIM-specific)	+	Reserved character set
7F	127	(reserved)	Class 3 (TE-specific)	+	Reserved character set
Coding Group: Reserved
DCS hex dec		Character Set	Message Class	Compressed	Reserved Because
80	128	(not defined)	Default	-	Reserved coding group
... up to ...
BF	191	(not defined)	Default	-	Reserved coding group
Coding Group: Message Waiting Info: Discard Message
DCS hex dec		Character Set	Message Waiting Information	Compressed	Reserved Because
C0	192	(not defined)	Voicemail Inactive	-	
C1	193	(not defined)	Fax Inactive	-	
C2	194	(not defined)	E-mail Inactive	-	
C3	195	(not defined)	Other Inactive	-	
C4	196	(not defined)	Voicemail Inactive	-	Value of bit 2
C5	197	(not defined)	Fax Inactive	-	Value of bit 2
C6	198	(not defined)	E-mail Inactive	-	Value of bit 2
C7	199	(not defined)	Other Inactive	-	Value of bit 2
C8	200	(not defined)	Voicemail Active	-	
C9	201	(not defined)	Fax Active	-	
CA	202	(not defined)	E-mail Active	-	
CB	203	(not defined)	Other Active	-	
CC	204	(not defined)	Voicemail Active	-	Value of bit 2
CD	205	(not defined)	Fax Active	-	Value of bit 2
CE	206	(not defined)	E-mail Active	-	Value of bit 2
CF	207	(not defined)	Other Active	-	Value of bit 2
Coding Group: Message Waiting Info: Store Message
DCS hex dec		Character Set	Message Waiting Information	Compressed	Reserved Because
D0	208	GSM 7 bit	Voicemail Inactive	-	
D1	209	GSM 7 bit	Fax Inactive	-	
D2	210	GSM 7 bit	E-mail Inactive	-	
D3	211	GSM 7 bit	Other Inactive	-	
D4	212	GSM 7 bit	Voicemail Inactive	-	Value of bit 2
D5	213	GSM 7 bit	Fax Inactive	-	Value of bit 2
D6	214	GSM 7 bit	E-mail Inactive	-	Value of bit 2
D7	215	GSM 7 bit	Other Inactive	-	Value of bit 2
D8	216	GSM 7 bit	Voicemail Active	-	
D9	217	GSM 7 bit	Fax Active	-	
DA	218	GSM 7 bit	E-mail Active	-	
DB	219	GSM 7 bit	Other Active	-	
DC	220	GSM 7 bit	Voicemail Active	-	Value of bit 2
DD	221	GSM 7 bit	Fax Active	-	Value of bit 2
DE	222	GSM 7 bit	E-mail Active	-	Value of bit 2
DF	223	GSM 7 bit	Other Active	-	Value of bit 2
E0	224	UCS2	Voicemail Inactive	-	
E1	225	UCS2	Fax Inactive	-	
E2	226	UCS2	E-mail Inactive	-	
E3	227	UCS2	Other Inactive	-	
E4	228	UCS2	Voicemail Inactive	-	Value of bit 2
E5	229	UCS2	Fax Inactive	-	Value of bit 2
E6	230	UCS2	E-mail Inactive	-	Value of bit 2
E7	231	UCS2	Other Inactive	-	Value of bit 2
E8	232	UCS2	Voicemail Active	-	
E9	233	UCS2	Fax Active	-	
EA	234	UCS2	E-mail Active	-	
EB	235	UCS2	Other Active	-	
EC	236	UCS2	Voicemail Active	-	Value of bit 2
ED	237	UCS2	Fax Active	-	Value of bit 2
EE	238	UCS2	E-mail Active	-	Value of bit 2
EF	239	UCS2	Other Active	-	Value of bit 2
Coding Group: Data Coding/Message Class
DCS hex dec		Character Set	Message Class	Compressed	Reserved Because
F0	240	GSM 7 bit	Class 0 (Flash message)	-	
F1	241	GSM 7 bit	Class 1 (ME-specific)	-	
F2	242	GSM 7 bit	Class 2 (SIM/USIM-specific)	-	
F3	243	GSM 7 bit	Class 3 (TE-specific)	-	
F4	244	8 bit data	Class 0 (Flash message)	-	
F5	245	8 bit data	Class 1 (ME-specific)	-	
F6	246	8 bit data	Class 2 (SIM/USIM-specific)	-	
F7	247	8 bit data	Class 3 (TE-specific)	-	
F8	248	GSM 7 bit	Class 0 (Flash message)	-	Value of bit 3
F9	249	GSM 7 bit	Class 1 (ME-specific)	-	Value of bit 3
FA	250	GSM 7 bit	Class 2 (SIM/USIM-specific)	-	Value of bit 3
FB	251	GSM 7 bit	Class 3 (TE-specific)	-	Value of bit 3
FC	252	8 bit data	Class 0 (Flash message)	-	Value of bit 3
FD	253	8 bit data	Class 1 (ME-specific)	-	Value of bit 3
FE	254	8 bit data	Class 2 (SIM/USIM-specific)	-	Value of bit 3
FF	255	8 bit data	Class 3 (TE-specific)	-	Value of bit 3

iDEN mobile standard uses values F7_{16} and F8_{16} in a special way.

=== CBS data coding scheme ===
For the DCS values in Cell Broadcast Messages see GSM recommendation 03.38.

== See also ==
- Short Message Service (SMS)
- Cell Broadcast
- GSM 03.38
- GSM 03.40
- User Data Header
- Concatenated SMS
- Short message service technical realisation (GSM)
- Enhanced Messaging Service
- Multimedia Messaging Service
- Short Message Peer-to-Peer
- Universal Computer Protocol
