= Neil Papworth =

Sender of the first text message

- Born: 28 December 1969 (age 56); Reading, Berkshire, UK
- Occupations: Software architect Designer, developer, & test engineer
- Years active: 1988-present
- Known for: Sending the world’s first text message
- Spouse: Jennifer Papworth (2007-present)
- Children: 3
- Website: neilpapworth.com

Neil Papworth (born 1969) is a British software architect, designer and developer. He is known as the sender of the first ever text message (also known as SMS message) in 1992.

== Personal life ==
Neil Papworth was born on 28 December 1969 in Reading, Berkshire, United Kingdom. Papworth obtained his HND (Higher National Diploma) in Computer Studies from the University of West London. He spent his childhood in Wokingham, Berkshire, and began his professional career at Ferranti International in Bracknell, United Kingdom. Papworth then settled in Toronto, Canada in 2000 and later moved to Montreal in 2002.

== Career ==
Neil Papworth started his career at Ferranti International in Bracknell on aeronautical and military applications from 1988 to 1991. He designed and programmed a movable vehicle satellite antenna and implemented software for automated helicopter-landing aids.

In 1991, he began working for Sema Group in Reading, Berkshire. He spent a large amount of time from 1993 onwards travelling around the world installing SMS systems. He relocated to Sema Group's Toronto office in January 2000.

He settled in Montreal, Quebec in September 2002. He remained with Sema Group (which became Airwide Solutions) until 2011. Since then, he worked for Tekelec, a telecommunications company, recently bought by Oracle Corporation. He worked at Oracle on 4G related technologies. In 2018, he started working at TriNimbus, a company providing Amazon Web Services consulting to customers, which was subsequently acquired by Onica in 2018, and then Onica was subsequently acquired by Rackspace in 2019.

== Contribution to text messaging ==
In 1992, Neil Papworth was working as a developer and test engineer at Sema Group Telecoms, in a team developing a Short Message Service Centre (SMSC) for their customer, Vodafone UK in Newbury, Berkshire. As part of this project, he sent the world's first text message, on 3 December 1992, at the age of 22. It was sent from a computer. The message was "Merry Christmas", and was sent to Richard Jarvis, a director at Vodafone, who was enjoying his office Christmas party. Richard Jarvis received the message on an Orbitel 901 handset.

He said in 2017 that he only sends a few texts per day and that they are typically "fairly dull." He does not use the emoji menu. Papworth gained popularity during the 10th and 20th anniversaries of the first text message, as highlighted in the press, and has been featured in several outlets such as a Super Bowl commercial, a documentary movie, a Jeopardy! question, and radio talk shows.
