= Kannel =

Kannel may refer to:

- Kannel (telecommunications), an open source Wireless Application Protocol (WAP) and Short Message Service (SMS) gateway for UNIX operating systems.
- Kannel (instrument), an Estonian zither similar to the Finnish kantele
- An alternative name for the Finnish kantele

== People ==
- Astrid Kannel (born 1967), Estonian television journalist
- Theophilus Van Kannel (1841–1919), American who invented the revolving door
- William B. Kannel, American physician
