= User Data Header =

GSM SMS metadata

User Data Header (UDH) is a binary structure which may be present at the start of a short message in the Short Message Service in GSM. It does not contain any text, but it specifies how the message should be formatted and processed.

UDH can be used to form Concatenated SMS, to enrich the content of the message with colors, text formatting, small pictures and animations and simple music which are used in Enhanced Messaging Service (EMS), to convey port numbers which may cause start of an application in the mobile phone, which is used for Multimedia Messaging Service (MMS) or to indicate using of national language shift tables.

UDH is defined in 3GPP 23.040 (originally GSM 03.40).

== Technical Realization ==
Presence of User Data Header is indicated by the TP-UDHI (Transfer Layer Protocol User Data Header Indicator) bit - 6th bit of the first octet of the GSM 03.40 or 3GPP 23.040 message.

If UDH is present, it is at the beginning of the TP-UD (TP-User Data) field and it always starts with an UDHL (UDH Length) octet. The rest of UDH is a sequence of Tag-Length-Value triplets. The Tag is named Information-Element-Identifier (IEI) and is always 1 octet long, the Length field is always 1 octet long and it specifies the length of the Information Element Data.

UDH uses space intended for the message payload. The longer the UDH, the less space remains for the message text or other contents. When TP-UD contains seven-bit data, the length of TP-UD is given in septets (but UDHL is still in octets, so length in septets is (UDHL + 1) * 8 / 7) and the UDH is filled to a septet boundary with 0-6 zero bits. The next table shows how a TP-UD of a message in the GSM 7 bit default alphabet containing text 'Hi' with a predefined sound 'Chord high' will be encoded:

TP-UD Octet	1	2	3	4	5	6	7
Value (hex)	04	0B	02	00	08	20	D3
Meaning	UDH Length	IEI: Predefined sound	IE Length	Position	Chord high	6 lower bits of the 1st char + 2 fill bits	7 lower bits of the 2nd char + 1 upper bit of the first char

The total message length TP-UDL will be 8. (UDH has 8 * (1 + 4) = 40 bits, 2 bits is the padding as (40 + 2) / 7 = 6 without remainder, 2 * 7 = 14 bits for text; total TP-UD length is 40 + 2 + 14 = 56 bits = 7 octets = 8 septets.)

== UDH Information Elements ==
IEI (hex)	Meaning	Classification	Length	May repeat
00	Concatenated short messages, 8-bit reference number	SMS Control	3	no
01	Special SMS Message Indication	SMS Control	2	yes
02	Reserved	N/A	N/A	yes
03	Not used to avoid misinterpretation as <LF> character	N/A	N/A	yes
04	Application port addressing scheme, 8 bit address	SMS Control	2	no
05	Application port addressing scheme, 16 bit address	SMS Control	4	no
06	SMSC Control Parameters	SMS Control	1	no
07	UDH Source Indicator	SMS Control	1	yes
08	Concatenated short message, 16-bit reference number	SMS Control	4	no
09	Wireless Control Message Protocol	SMS Control	1-255	yes
0A	Text Formatting	EMS Control	3-4	yes
0B	Predefined Sound	EMS Content	2	yes
0C	User Defined Sound (iMelody max 128 bytes)	EMS Content	2-129	yes
0D	Predefined Animation	EMS Content	2	yes
0E	Large Animation (16*16 times 4 = 32*4 =128 bytes)	EMS Content	129	yes
0F	Small Animation (8*8 times 4 = 8*4 =32 bytes)	EMS Content	33	yes
10	Large Picture (32*32 = 128 bytes)	EMS Content	129	yes
11	Small Picture (16*16 = 32 bytes)	EMS Content	33	yes
12	Variable Picture	EMS Content	4-255	yes
13	User prompt indicator	EMS Control	1	yes
14	Extended Object	EMS Content	7-255	yes
15	Reused Extended Object	EMS Control	3	yes
16	Compression Control	EMS Control	3-255	no
17	Object Distribution Indicator	EMS Control	2	yes
18	Standard WVG object	EMS Content	1-255	yes
19	Character Size WVG object	EMS Content	1-255	yes
1A	Extended Object Data Request Command	EMS Control	0-255	no
1B	Reserved for future EMS features	N/A	0-255	yes
1C	Reserved for future EMS features	N/A	0-255	yes
1D	Reserved for future EMS features	N/A	0-255	yes
1E	Reserved for future EMS features	N/A	0-255	yes
1F	Reserved for future EMS features	N/A	0-255	yes
20	RFC 822 E-Mail Header	SMS Control	1	no
21	Hyperlink format element	SMS Control	0-255	yes
22	Reply Address Element	SMS Control	1-255	no
23	Enhanced Voice Mail Information	SMS Control	0-255	no
24	National Language Single Shift	SMS Control	1	no
25	National Language Locking Shift	SMS Control	1	no
26	Filler	SMS Control	0-255	yes
27 – 6F	Reserved for future use	N/A	0-255	N/A
70 – 7F	(U)SIM Toolkit Security Headers	SMS Control	0-255	?
80 – 9F	SME to SME specific use	SMS Control	0-255	?
A0 – BF	Reserved for future use	N/A	0-255	?
C0 – DF	SC specific use	SMS Control	0-255	?
E0 – FF	Reserved for future use	N/A	0-255	?

== Use in Other Protocols ==
The UDH is used in other protocols for short message transport - Short Message Peer-to-Peer (SMPP), Universal Computer Protocol (UCP) and in WEMT teleservice in CDMA2000.

== See also ==
- Short Message Service
- GSM 03.38
- Enhanced Messaging Service
- Multimedia Messaging Service
- Short Message Peer-to-Peer
- Universal Computer Protocol
