= Dombivli Nagari Sahakari Bank =

Bank of India

Dombivli Nagari Sahakari Bank Ltd.
- Type: Multi-State Schedule Bank
- Industry: Banking
- Founded: 6 September 1970.
- Headquarters: Dombivli Nagari Sahakari Bank Ltd. Scheduled Bank, "Madhukunj", P-52, M.I.D.C., Kalyan Shil Road, Sonarpada,, Dombivli (East), Thane, India
- Products: Retail Banking; Debit Cards; Current Account; Saving Account; Corporate Banking; Corporate Loan; Internet Banking; SMS Banking; Mobile Banking
- Number of employees: 750+
- Website: Official Website

Dombivli Nagari Sahakari Bank Ltd. (DNS BANK) is the Multi-State Scheduled Bank located in the Thane District, state of Maharashtra established on 6 September 1970. Having their Head office in Dombivli, Thane District. Currently DNS Bank has 65 branches across 12 districts in state of Maharashtra.

Dombivli Nagari Sahakari Bank Ltd. got Scheduled status in the year 1996. In year 2006 this bank implemented Core Banking Services. DNS Bank is 1st Co-operative Bank to launch Mobile Banking Services in India. DNS Bank has adapted new technology.

Dombivli Nagari Sahakari Bank fall under Scheduled Urban Cooperative Banks in India and it regulatory body is Reserve Bank of India. Dombivli Nagari Sahakari Bank is one of the banks where Core Banking Solution (CBS) is in operation.

Dombivli Nagari Sahakari Bank is Live on Unified Payments Interface (UPI).
