= Esme (disambiguation) =

Esmé is a French given name.

Esme or ESME may also refer to:

- Eşme, a town in Turkey
- Esme (damselfly), a genus of damselflies
- Esmé (restaurant), Chicago, United States
- "Esmé", a story by Saki
- "Esme", a song on the Joanna Newsom album Have One on Me, and its titular character
- External Short Messaging Entity, in telecommunications
- ESME, ICAO airport code of Eslöv Airport, an airport in Sweden

== See also ==
- ESME-Sudria, a French educational institution
