= BCODE =

SMS message for encoding tickets

A bCODE is an identifier that can be sent to a mobile phone/device and used as a ticket/voucher/identification or other type of token. The bCODE is an SMS message that can be read electronically from the screen of a mobile device. Bcodes can be sent by text message, and as they are just a standard SMS they can be received on over 99% of all devices.

Bcodes have many uses such as advertising, loyalty programs, promotions, ticketing and more.

== History ==
bCODE was developed by an Australian company from 2003 to 2005.

== bCODE Technology ==
A bCODE is a simple SMS text message that looks something like this:

bCODE
=TYHGV=WPLKN=
=XCNET=9Y32<=
=5YUFK=4UWKX=

This text message is read from the screen of a mobile phone/device and decoded into a unique token ID. This ID can then be used to supply the consumer with their own unique experience.
