= Kannel (telecommunications) =

Open-source Wireless Application Protocol gateway

Kannel WAP and SMS Gateway
- Developer: The Kannel Group
- Stable release: 1.4.5 / June 19, 2018
- Written in: C
- Operating system: Cross-platform
- Type: Gateway
- License: Kannel Software License (very similar to the Apache License v. 1.1)
- Website: www.kannel.org
- Repository: redmine.kannel.org/projects/kannel/repository

In computing, Kannel is an open-source WAP gateway. It provides the essential part of the WAP infrastructure as open source software to everyone so that the market potential for WAP services, both from wireless operators and specialized service providers, will be realized as efficiently as possible.

Kannel also works as an SMS gateway for GSM networks. Almost all GSM phones can send and receive SMS messages, so this is a way to serve many more clients than just those using WAP.

== History ==
The Kannel project was founded by Wapit Ltd. in June, 1999. Wapit no longer exists and the project is coordinated by the members of the Kannel Group which include the wireless business industry companies 3G LAB Ltd. (UK), Wapme Systems AG (DE), ANAM (IE) andlobal Networks Inc. (CH) among other individual developers and contributors. The Kannel Group is in the process of forming a legal body for the Kannel Project, the Kannel Software Foundation (KSF). As of 2004 ANAM has retired from supporting Kannel, and in 2006 also Wapme Systems has stopped its business operations.

== Core developers ==
The project development coordination is led by The Kannel Group, with Stipe Tolj, Andreas Fink and Alexander Malysh as chairmen. Various other individual developers around the world contribute code and file problem-reports.
