= Long number =

A long number (e.g. +44 7624 800555 in international notation or 07624 800555 in UK national notation), also known as a virtual mobile number (VMN), dedicated phone number MSISDN or long code, is a reception mechanism used by businesses to receive SMS messages and voice calls. As well as being internationally available, long numbers enable businesses to have their own number, rather than short codes which are generally shared across a lot of brands. Long numbers allows a wide range of industries to generate large amounts of mobile-originated SMS from the subscribers, such as wireless application service providers, mobile virtual network operators, mobile virtual network enablers, SMS aggregators, e-sellers, advertising agencies, media channels and mobile infrastructure providers.

== Long numbers vs. short codes ==
Both long numbers and short codes have their advantages and disadvantages.

| Long numbers | Short codes |
|---|---|
| International accessibility | Limited to national borders |
| Long-term basis | Short-term basis |
| Obtained directly from mobile messaging providers with SS7 access E.g. +44762480 COKE or from land telephony operators - e.g. +441103040332 | Owned by the mobile network operator; service providers can rent a number through an aggregator E.g. 75192 |
| Low cost | High cost |
| Can support voice | Voice is an expensive add-on option |

International accessibility is useful for global organizations who wish to run international campaigns. Limited to national borders, short codes have to be activated in each country where the campaign will take place, which might be expensive and time-consuming. For long-term campaigns or any other assignment, long numbers are also a good solution, as the number can be assigned exclusively for a long term. The long numbers option can be obtained directly from an SMS provider with SS7 access, which is the shortest way possible to have an SMS reception option. Alternatively, long numbers can be obtained from SMS aggregators or SMS providers. To have access to a short code, service providers must enter a bilateral agreement with the mobile network operator that actually owns the number. This process can take time, and potentially cause delays in implementing campaigns. Alternatively, service providers can rent short codes from aggregators, creating another middleman in the value-chain. Premium messaging services are not possible on long numbers; those require short codes and operator agreements.

== Application of long numbers ==
- Competitions and voting initiated by TV and radio shows
- Product feedback, campaigns and promotions (the number can be printed on a product package)
- Globally available number for international companies and events
- Reception of SMS for companies wishing to interact with consumers
- Reply path to online tools, software packages, etc.
- 2-way communication with service engineers, sales forces and suppliers
- Reception of SMS to be forwarded to computer or user account
- SMS-to-email applications
- SMS multi-party chat services
- Feedback SMS for mass mailings or promotional activities
