= CIMD =

Short message service centre protocol

Computer Interface to Message Distribution (CIMD) is a proprietary short message service centre protocol developed by Nokia for their SMSC (now: Nokia Networks).

== Syntax ==
An example CIMD exchange looks like the following:

 <STX>03:007<TAB>021:12345678<TAB>033:hello<TAB><ETX>   
 <STX>53:007<TAB>021:12345678<TAB>060:971107131212<TAB><ETX>

Each packet starts with STX (hex 02) and ends with ETX (hex 03). The content of the packet consists of fields separated by TAB (hex 09). Each field, in turn, consists of a parameter type, a colon (:), and the parameter value. Note that the last field must also be terminated with a TAB before the ETX.

Two-digit parameter types are operation codes and each message must have exactly one. The number after the operation code is the sequence number used to match an operation to its response. The response code (acknowledgement) of the message is equal to the operation code plus 50.

In the example above, the operation code 03 means submit message. Field 021 defines the destination address (telephone number), with field 033 is the user data (content) of the message. Response code 53 with a field 060 time stamp indicates that the message was accepted; if the message failed, the SMSC would reply with field 900 (error code) instead. A good amount of supporting software to implement CIMD is available from Nokia's Website to build CIMD client. You can fire SMS from message center with the help of CIMD client tools.

== See also ==
- Universal Computer Protocol/External Machine Interface (UCP/EMI)
- Short message peer-to-peer protocol (SMPP)

== Software ==
- Kannel, Open-Source WAP and SMS Gateway with CIMD 1.3 and CIMD 2.0 support.
- Ixonos MISP CIMD simulator, Open-Source CIMD v2 compliant server for testing CIMD client applications
