= SMS gateway =

Software to send or receive text messages

An SMS gateway is used to bridge between applications that need to send and/or receive SMS and a mobile network's Short Message Service Center (SMSC). As a result, SMS gateways provide a means of sending and receiving SMS between applications and mobile users.

In most cases, SMS and MMS are eventually routed to a mobile phone through a wireless carrier. SMS gateways are commonly used as a method for person-to-person to device-to-person (also known as application-to-person) communications. Many SMS gateways support content and media conversions from email, push, voice, and other formats.

== Gateway types ==
Several mobile telephone network operators have true fixed-wire SMS services. These are based on extensions to the European Telecommunications Standards Institute (ETSI) Global System for Mobile Communications (GSM) SMS standards and allow messaging between any mix of fixed and mobile equipment. These use frequency-shift keying to transfer the message between the terminal and the Short Message Service Center (SMSC). Terminals are usually based on Digital Enhanced Cordless Telecommunications (DECT), but wired handsets and wired text-only (no voice) devices exist. Messages are received by the terminal recognising that the Caller ID is that of the SMSC and going off-hook silently to receive the message.

== Implementations ==
=== GSM gateway appliance ===
A direct-to-mobile gateway is a device equipped with built-in wireless GSM connectivity that enables SMS text messages to be sent and received directly via a mobile network. Messages can originate from email, web pages, or other software applications, using a unique identifier from the mobile phone's Subscriber Identity Module (SIM card). Unlike SMS aggregators, which route messages through third-party networks, direct-to-mobile gateways are installed on an organization’s own network and connect directly to a local mobile operator.

The connection is established by acquiring a SIM card from a mobile operator and installing it in the gateway. These appliances traditionally handle hundreds to thousands of messages per month, while modern devices can send up to 100,000 messages daily. Vendors that historically provided GSM gateways for voice communications have expanded their offerings to include SMS capabilities.

Advanced gateways often include features such as SIM management to control message volume per SIM, ODBC support to interface with databases, and HTTP or SMPP interfaces for integration with third-party applications. They provide organizations with enhanced control over delivery, compliance, and reporting compared to traditional SMS aggregator services. Direct-to-mobile gateways are commonly used in scenarios requiring high reliability and timely message delivery, such as transactional notifications, promotional campaigns, and operational alerts.

==== Regulation ====
GSM gateway equipment is covered by the Wireless Telegraphy Act in the UK and can legally be used by any business to send SMS to their own customers or prospects when using their own gateway equipment. In Canada, SMS gateway providers are regulated by the Canadian Wireless Telecommunications Association (CWTA/txt.ca). In India, it is regulated by the Telecom Regulatory Authority of India (TRAI). In Pakistan, it is regulated by the Pakistan Telecommunication Authority(PTA).

=== Direct-to-SMSC ===
A direct-to-short message service centre (SMSC) gateway is a software application, or a component within a software application, that connects directly to a mobile operator's SMSC via the Internet or direct leased line connections. The Short Message Peer-to-Peer (SMPP) protocol is typically used to convey SMS between an application and the SMSC. Direct-to-SMSC gateways are used by SMS aggregators to provide SMS services to their clients and large businesses who can justify such use. They are typically employed for high volume messaging and require a contract directly with a mobile operator.

=== Direct-to-SMS gateway ===
An SMS gateway typically sits between the end-user who needs to send/receive SMS and a mobile network's SMSC. Such gateways provide their customers with a choice of protocols, including HTTP, SMTP, Short Message Peer-to-Peer and Web Services. Providers of SMS gateway services include SMS aggregators and mobile operators. SMS gateways are also available as part of messaging services such as AOL, ICQ and others.

In order to send/receive messages with mobile subscribers, an SMS gateway connects with (i) mobile network SMSCs and/or (ii) other SMS gateways. It is, therefore, possible that an SMS gateway has a combination of connections with mobile network SMSCs and connections with other SMS gateways in order to provide its services. However, there is an increasing potential for delivery problems with SMS with increasing number of SMS gateways in the delivery chain.

== Email clients ==
Text messages can be sent from a personal computer to mobile devices via an SMS gateway or Multimedia Messaging Service (MMS) gateway, using the most popular email client programs, such as Outlook, Thunderbird, and so on. The messages must be sent in ASCII "text-only" mode. If they are sent in HTML mode or using non-ASCII characters, they will most likely appear as nonsense on the recipient's mobile telephone.

Before the message can be sent, one must determine the domain of the mobile carrier's SMS gateway. For example, if one wants to send a message to a mobile telephone in the United States serviced by AT&T, and the telephone number is +1 415-123-4567, the email would be addressed as

4151234567@txt.att.net

To determine the SMS gateway domain, e.g., txt.att.net, may require research - but most users know who their carrier is. The telephone number in this example for a US number is expressed as ten (10) digits, without the country code (1) and without dashes or other separator characters when composing the email address. The country code is not needed, as the 10-digit telephone number, together with the email domain, are sufficient to send the email from any location in the world.

It is useful to perform a character count before sending the message to ensure that it is within the 160-character limit. If it exceeds the limit, the SMS gateway should break the message into a set of consecutive 160-character, or shorter, messages to the mobile equipment, although breaks may occur in the middle of words.

A message sent with an email client can be simultaneously addressed to multiple mobile telephones - just as text messages sent in the usual manner between mobile telephones can be sent to multiple recipients.

SMS gateway domains for other carriers (US-based):

Mobile carrier	SMS gateway domain	MMS gateway domain
Alltel	sms.alltelwireless.com	mms.alltelwireless.com
AT&T	txt.att.net (Discontinued)	mms.att.net
Boost Mobile	sms.myboostmobile.com	myboostmobile.com
Consumer Cellular	mailmymobile.net	mailmymobile.net
Cricket Wireless	mms.cricketwireless.net	mms.cricketwireless.net
FirstNet	sms.firstnet.com 1waysms.firstnet.com	sms.firstnet.com 1waysms.firstnet.com
Google Fi Wireless		msg.fi.google.com
MetroPCS	mymetropcs.com	mymetropcs.com
Republic Wireless	text.republicwireless.com	
Sprint	messaging.sprintpcs.com	pm.sprint.com
T-Mobile	tmomail.net	tmomail.net
Ting	message.ting.com	
U.S. Cellular	email.uscc.net	mms.uscc.net
Verizon Wireless	vtext.com (discontinued)	vzwpix.com
Virgin Mobile	vmobl.com	vmpix.com
XFinity Mobile	vtext.com	mypixmessages.com

SMS gateway domains for Canadian carriers:

Mobile carrier	SMS gateway domain
Bell Canada	txt.bell.ca
Bell MTS	text.mts.net
Fido Solutions	fido.ca
Freedom Mobile	txt.freedommobile.ca (Discontinued)
Koodo Mobile	msg.telus.com
PC Mobile	mobiletxt.ca
Rogers Communications	pcs.rogers.com (Discontinued)
SaskTel	sms.sasktel.com
Telus	msg.telus.com

08/2026: Multiple carriers have sunset this support (Verizon, AT&T). There are other third party carriers which can enable support, but is not natively being supported by multiple carriers.

== See also ==
- Kannel (telecommunications)
- Videoconferencing
- Voice over IP
