= Teletex =

Old ITU-T standard

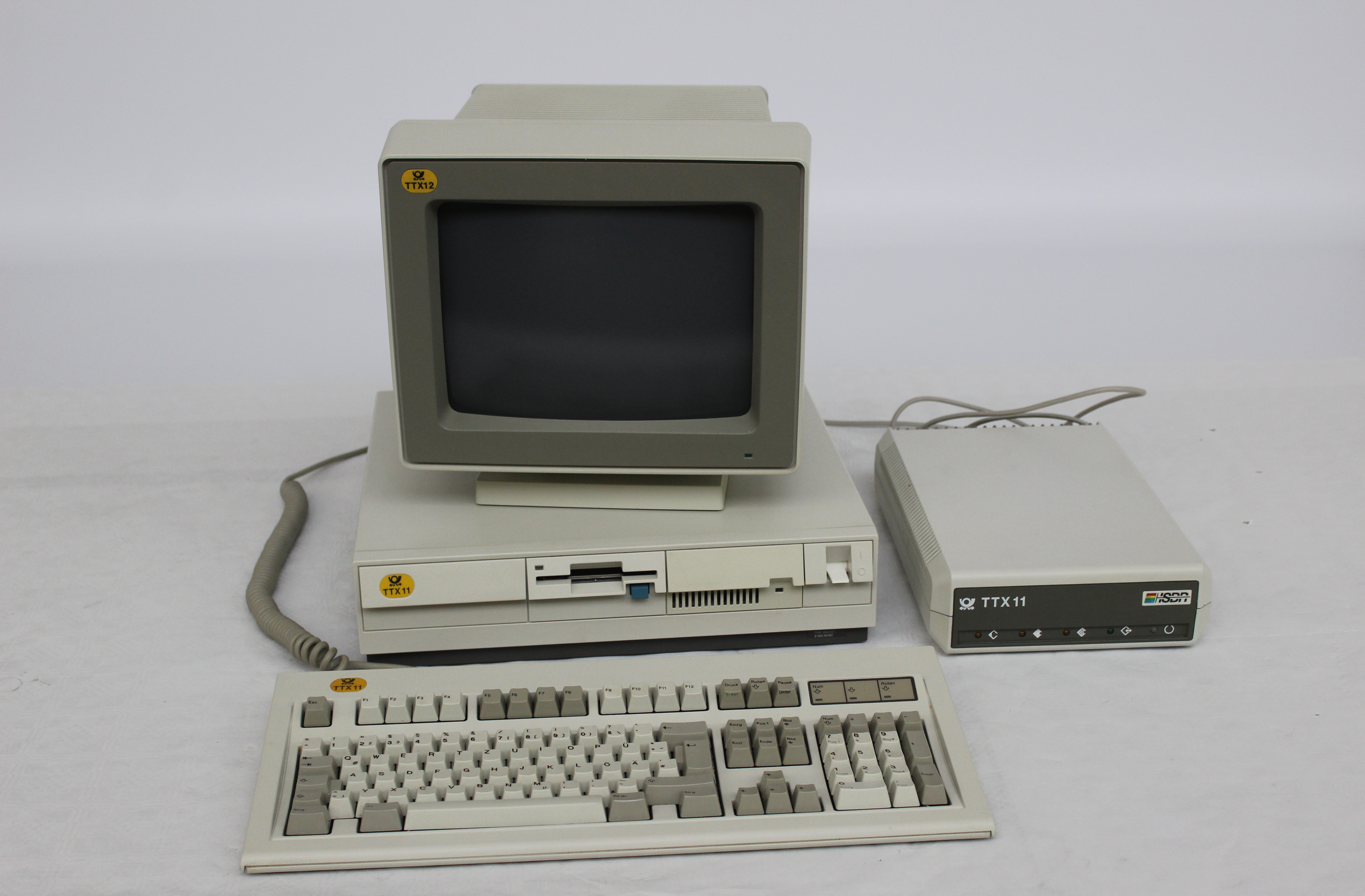
TTX11 terminal, in this case being relabeled IBM PS/2.

Teletex was ITU-T specification F.200 for a text and document communications service that could be provided over telephone lines. It was rapidly superseded by e-mail; however, the name Teletex lives on in several of the X.500 standard attributes used in Lightweight Directory Access Protocol.

== Overview ==
Teletex was designed as an upgrade to the conventional telex service. The terminal-to-terminal communication service of telex would be turned into an office-to-office document transmission system by teletex. Teletex envisaged direct communication between electronic typewriters, word processors and personal computers. These units had storage for transmitting and receiving messages. The use of such equipment considerably enhanced the character set available for document preparation.

== Features ==
=== Character sets ===
In addition to the standard character set, a rich set of graphic symbols and a comprehensive set of control characters were supported in teletex. The set of control characters helped prepare and reproduce documents. In particular, they could be used to position the printing element, specify page orientation, left and right margins, vertical spacing, and to use underlining. The page control feature could be used to receive messages for standard A4 size papers instead of the continuous stationery used in conventional telex systems.

=== Transmission and reception ===
A background/foreground operation was envisaged in teletex. Transmission/reception of messages should proceed in the background without affecting the work which the user might be carrying out in the foreground with the equipment. In other words, a user might be preparing a new document, while another document was being transmitted or received. The teletex would also maintain compatibility with the present telex system and inter-operate with it. Telex procedures called for the exchange of header information before the actual document transfer took place. The header information consisted of four parts:

1. Part: Destination ID,
2. Part: Originator ID,
3. Part: Date and time stamp,
4. Part: Document reference.

Twenty-four characters were used for source/destination ids, 14 characters for date and time stamp, and 7 characters for document reference (which also specified the number of pages in the document). Destination/source ID consisted of four fields:

1. Field: Country/Network code,
2. Field: National subscriber number,
3. Field: Reserved for future use,
4. Field: Terminal/Owner code.

The number of characters allotted to each of the above fields was variable, subject to a maximum for each field, the total being 24 characters.
