= Aldiscon =

Aldiscon Limited was a telecommunications software company founded in Dublin, Ireland, in 1988. The company supplied software products to mobile phone operators and became a leader in the supply of short message service centres (SMSC).

== History ==
Aldiscon was founded in 1988 by Gilbert Little.

Aldiscon launched the world's first commercial Short Messaging Services in 1993 using its Telepath SMSC platform in the UK, Hong Kong and USA. By the time of its sale to Logica Plc in 1997, the company supplied over 70 mobile carriers worldwide in technologies including GSM, DCS 1800, UMTS, IS-95 (CDMA), CDMA2000, ANSI-136 (TDMA), Japanese PDC and Motorola's iDEN.

Aldiscon developed the Short Message Peer-to-Peer (SMPP) telecommunications industry protocol for exchanging SMS messages between SMS peer entities such as short message service centres, voice mail systems and distributed telemetry elements. By the late 1990s, the company put the protocol into a non-profit entity called the SMS Forum whose members included both messaging system suppliers and carriers.

Aldiscon founders helped establish several mobile software companies based in the Republic of Ireland and in Northern Ireland, UK. Some include Aldiscon, Apion, Aepona, Ammeon, Accuris Networks and Altion.

Aldiscon originally consisted of three subsidiaries: Aldiscon Telecommunications Software Systems, Ltd. based in Dublin, Ireland; Aldiscon, Inc. based in Dublin, Ohio USA; and Aldiscon Northern Ireland Ltd. based in Belfast, Northern Ireland.

== Acquisition by Logica ==
Aldiscon was acquired by Logica Plc of London, UK in 1997 for GBP 56.9 million. Logica Plc was a large systems integration firm and it renamed Aldiscon as Logica Mobile Networks. By 2002, Logica Mobile Networks generated USD 400M of Logica's revenue. At the time of the sale, Aldiscon Northern Ireland was spun out into a separate company, Apion Ltd, and retained by the original owners. Logica Mobile Networks was divested from Logica in 2007, with the new company named Acision and Aldiscon founder Larry Quinn returning to chair it.

In October 1999, Phone.com acquired APiON's Wireless Application Protocol (WAP) product division. APiON shareholders received 1.3 million shares in Phone.com valued at approximately £150 million (US$239 million). A new spin off company, AePONA, was created at same time and retained by the original owners.
