= SMS home routing =

SMS Home Routing is a modification to the original GSM specifications that changed the way inbound (off-net) SMS messages are treated by mobile telecommunications networks. Adopted by the 3GPP in 2007, Home Routing was devised to enable mobile networks to offer a full range of advanced services on both inbound and outbound SMS, giving more utility to phone users and enabling operators to generate additional revenue.

== The roots of the problem ==
The original GSM specifications provided for all outbound and cross-network messaging to pass through the home network message entity, but inbound messages generated on other networks to be sent directly to target handsets under the control of the sending network, not the home network.

This inconsistency arose from the fact that SMS was conceived as a voicemail alert system, not a person-to-person messaging system, and it put SMS out of step with most other forms of communication including voice telephony, email and MMS where the home entity has responsibility for the management of both inbound and outbound traffic.

In 2006 UK mobile operator Vodafone argued before the 3GPP that by effectively putting a large percentage of SMS traffic outside the direct control of the receiving network, the original GSM specification prevented operators from generating new revenue by offering certain types of value-added SMS services.

== The Home Routing solution ==
Home Routing uses the recipient network Home Location Register (HLR) to change the flow of inbound off-net messages, directing them to an SMS router, rather than straight to target handsets. There, advanced services such as divert, copy, archiving and anti-spam can be applied before messages are delivered.

SMS Home Routing was standardized by the 3GPP in two forms; Non-Transparent Home Routing supporting all types of advanced SMS services and, in response to lobbying from bulk SMS service providers, Transparent Home Routing supporting a limited sub-set of advanced SMS services and the issuance of delivery receipts.
