= Short Message Peer-to-Peer =

Protocol for transferring short messages

Short Message Peer-to-Peer (SMPP) in the telecommunications industry is an open, industry standard protocol designed to provide a flexible data communication interface for the transfer of short message data between External Short Messaging Entities (ESMEs), Routing Entities (REs) and SMSC.

SMPP is often used to allow third parties (e.g. value-added service providers like news organizations) to submit messages, often in bulk, but it may be used for SMS peering as well. SMPP is able to carry short messages including EMS, voicemail notifications, Cell Broadcasts, WAP messages including WAP Push messages (used to deliver MMS notifications), USSD messages and others. Because of its versatility and support for non-GSM SMS protocols, like UMTS, IS-95 (CDMA), CDMA2000, ANSI-136 (TDMA) and iDEN, SMPP is the most commonly used protocol for short message exchange outside SS7 networks.

== History ==
SMPP (Short Message Peer-to-Peer) was originally designed by Aldiscon, a small Irish company that was later acquired by Logica (since 2016, after a number of changes Mavenir). The protocol was originally created by a developer, Ian J Chambers, to test the functionality of the SMSC without using SS7 test equipment to submit messages.

In 1995 the ETSI included the SMPP protocol into the technical report TR 03.39.

In 1999 Logica formally handed over SMPP to the SMPP Developers Forum, later renamed as The SMS Forum.

The SMS Forum disbanded in 2007, with this announcement: "The SMS Forum, a non-profit organization with a mission to develop, foster and promote SMS (short message service) to the benefit of the global wireless industry will disband by July 27, 2007." As part of the original handover terms, SMPP ownership returned to Mavenir.

== Operation ==
SMPP uses the client–server model of operation, despite "peer-to-peer" in the name. The Short Message Service Center (SMSC) usually acts as a server, awaiting connections from ESMEs. When SMPP is used for SMS peering, the sending MC usually acts as a client.

The protocol is based on pairs of request/response PDUs (protocol data units, or packets) exchanged over OSI layer 4 (TCP session or X.25 SVC3) connections. The well-known port assigned by the IANA for SMPP when operating over TCP is 2775, but multiple arbitrary port numbers are often used in messaging environments.

Before exchanging any messages, a bind command must be sent and acknowledged. The bind command determines in which direction will be possible to send messages; bind_transmitter only allows client to submit messages to the server, bind_receiver means that the client will only receive the messages, and bind_transceiver (introduced in SMPP 3.4) allows message transfer in both directions. In the bind command the ESME identifies itself using system_id, system_type and password; the address_range field designed to contain ESME address is usually left empty. The bind command contains interface_version parameter to specify which version of SMPP protocol will be used.

Message exchange may be synchronous, where each peer waits for a response for each PDU being sent, or asynchronous, where multiple requests can be issued without waiting and acknowledged in a skew order by the other peer; the number of unacknowledged requests is called a window; for the best performance both communicating sides must be configured with the same window size.

=== Versions ===
The SMPP standard has evolved during the time. The most commonly used versions of SMPP are:

- SMPP 3.3 the oldest used version (despite its limitations, it is still widely used); supports GSM only. Generates an immediate response for each message sent.
- SMPP 3.4 adds optional tag–length–value (TLV) parameters, support of non-GSM SMS technologies and the transceiver support (single connections that can send and receive messages). The exchange of SMPP request and response PDUs between an ESME Transmitter and SMSC may occur synchronously or asynchronously.
- SMPP 5.0 is the latest version of SMPP; adds support for cell broadcasting, smart flow control. As of 2025, it is not widely used.

The applicable version is passed in the interface_version parameter of a bind command.

== PDU format (after version 3.4) ==
The SMPP PDUs are binary encoded for efficiency. They start with a header which may be followed by a body:

SMPP PDU
| PDU Header (mandatory) | | | | PDU Body (Optional) |
| Command length | Command; Id | Command; Status | Sequence; Number | PDU Body |
| 4 octets | Length = (Command Length value - 4) octets | | | |

=== PDU header ===
Each PDU starts with a header. The header consists of 4 fields, each of length of 4 octets:

command_length
Is the overall length of the PDU in octets (including command_length field itself); must be ≥ 16 as each PDU must contain the 16 octet header
command_id
Identifies the SMPP operation (or command). If the most significant bit is cleared, this is a request operation. Otherwise it is a response.
command_status
Always has a value of 0 in requests; in responses it carries information about the result of the operation
sequence_number
Is used to correlate requests and responses within an SMPP session; allows asynchronous communication (using a sliding window method)

All numeric fields in SMPP use the big endian order, which means that the first octet is the Most Significant Byte (MSB).

== Example ==
This is an example of the binary encoding of a 60-octet submit_sm PDU. The data is shown in Hex octet values as a single dump and followed by a header and body break-down of that PDU.

This is best compared with the definition of the submit_sm PDU from the SMPP specification in order to understand how the encoding matches the field by field definition.

The value break-downs are shown with decimal in parentheses and Hex values after that. Where you see one or several hex octets appended, this is because the given field size uses 1 or more octets encoding.

Again, reading the definition of the submit_sm PDU from the spec will make all this clearer.

=== PDU header ===
'command_length', (60) ... 00 00 00 3C
'command_id',      (4) ... 00 00 00 04
'command_status',  (0) ... 00 00 00 00
'sequence_number', (5) ... 00 00 00 05

=== PDU body ===
'service_type',                 () ... 00
'source_addr_ton',             (2) ... 02
'source_addr_npi',             (8) ... 08
'source_addr',               (555) ... 35 35 35 00
'dest_addr_ton',               (1) ... 01
'dest_addr_npi',               (1) ... 01
'dest_addr',           (555555555) ... 35 35 35 35 35 35 35 35 35 00
'esm_class',                   (0) ... 00
'protocol_id',                 (0) ... 00
'priority_flag',               (0) ... 00
'schedule_delivery_time',      (0) ... 00
'validity_period',             (0) ... 00
'registered_delivery',         (0) ... 00
'replace_if_present_flag',     (0) ... 00
'data_coding',                 (3) ... 03
'sm_default_msg_id',           (0) ... 00
'sm_length',                  (15) ... 0F
'short_message', (Hello Wikipedia) ... 48 65 6C 6C 6F 20 57 69 6B 69 70 65 64 69 61

Note that the text in the short_message field must match the data_coding. When the data_coding is 8 (UCS2), the text must be in UCS-2BE (or its extension, UTF-16BE). When the data_coding indicates a 7-bit encoding, each septet is stored in a separate octet in the short_message field (with the most significant bit set to 0). SMPP 3.3 data_coding exactly copied TP-DCS values of GSM 03.38, which make it suitable only for GSM 7-bit default alphabet, UCS2 or binary messages; SMPP 3.4 introduced a new list of data_coding values:

| data_coding | Meaning |
|---|---|
| 0 | SMSC Default Alphabet (SMPP 3.4) / MC Specific (SMPP 5.0) |
| 1 | IA5 (CCITT T.50)/ASCII (ANSI X3.4) |
| 2 | Octet unspecified (8-bit binary) |
| 3 | Latin 1 (ISO-8859-1) |
| 4 | Octet unspecified (8-bit binary) |
| 5 | JIS (X 0208-1990) |
| 6 | Cyrillic (ISO-8859-5) |
| 7 | Latin/Hebrew (ISO-8859-8) |
| 8 | UCS2 (ISO/IEC-10646) |
| 9 | Pictogram Encoding |
| 10 | ISO-2022-JP (Music Codes) |
| 11 | Reserved |
| 12 | Reserved |
| 13 | Extended Kanji JIS (X 0212–1990) |
| 14 | KS C 5601 |
| 15-191 | reserved |
| 192-207 | GSM MWI control - see GSM 03.38 |
| 208-223 | GSM MWI control - see GSM 03.38 |
| 224-239 | reserved |
| 240-255 | GSM message class control - see GSM 03.38 |

The meaning of the data_coding=4 or 8 is the same as in SMPP 3.3. Other values in the range 1-15 are reserved in SMPP 3.3. Unfortunately, unlike SMPP 3.3, where data_coding=0 was unambiguously GSM 7-bit default alphabet, for SMPP 3.4 and higher the GSM 7-bit default alphabet is missing in this list, and data_coding=0 may differ for various Short message service centers—it may be ISO-8859-1, ASCII, GSM 7-bit default alphabet, UTF-8 or even configurable per ESME. When using data_coding=0, both sides (ESME and SMSC) must be sure they consider it the same encoding. Otherwise it is better not to use data_coding=0. It may be tricky to use the GSM 7-bit default alphabet, some Short message service centers requires data_coding=0, others e.g. data_coding=241.

== Quirks ==
Despite its wide acceptance, the SMPP has a number of problematic features:

- No standardized data_coding value for GSM default alphabet
- No standardized meaning of data_coding=0
- Unclear support for Shift-JIS encoding
- Incompatibility of submit_sm_resp between SMPP versions
- Using of SMPP 3.3 SMSC Delivery Receipts, especially the Message Id format in them

=== No standardized data_coding value for GSM default alphabet ===
Although data_coding value in SMPP 3.3 are based on the GSM 03.38, since SMPP 3.4 there is not a standardized data_coding value for the GSM default alphabet (GSM 03.38). It is further ambiguous whether the 7-bit characters are packed, as in GSM, allowing sending 160 characters in 140 octets, or whether each 7-bit character is encoded as an entire octet (with the high bit set to zero, as with ASCII).

=== No standardized meaning of data_coding=0 ===
According to SMPP 3.4 and 5.0 the value data_coding=0 means ″SMSC Default Alphabet″. Which encoding it really is, depends on the type of the SMSC and its configuration.

=== Unclear support for Shift-JIS encoding ===
One of the encodings in CDMA standard C.R1001 is Shift-JIS used for Japanese. SMPP 3.4 and 5.0 specifies three encodings for Japanese (JIS, ISO-2022-JP and Extended Kanji JIS), but none of them is identical with CDMA MSG_ENCODING 00101. It seems that the Pictogram encoding (data_coding=9) is used to carry the messages in Shift-JIS in SMPP.

=== Incompatibility of submit_sm_resp between SMPP versions ===
When a submit_sm fails, the SMSC returns a submit_sm_resp with non-zero value of command_status and ″empty″ message_id.

- SMPP 3.3 explicitly states about the message_id field ″If absent this field must contain a single NULL byte″. The length of the PDU is at least 17 octets.
- SMPP 3.4 contains an unfortunate note in the SUBMIT_SM_RESP section ″The submit_sm_resp PDU Body is not returned if the command_status field contains a non-zero value.″ Then the length of the PDU is 16 octets.
- SMPP 5.0 just specifies that message_id is a mandatory parameter of the type C-Octet string of the submit_sm_resp message. According to the section 3.1.1 NULL Settings, ″A NULL string ″″ is encoded as 0x00″. The length of the PDU is at least 17 octets.

For the best compatibility, any SMPP implementation should accept both variants of negative submit_sm_resp regardless of the version of SMPP standard used for the communication.

The original intention of error scenarios was that no body would be returned in the PDU response. This was the standard behavior exhibited on all Aldiscon/Logica SMSC and also in most of the other vendors. When SMPP 3.4 was being taken on by the WAP forum, several clarifications were requested on whether a body should be included with NACKed response and measures were taken to clarify this in several places in the specification including the submit_sm section and also in the bind_transceiver section. What should have been done was to add the clarification that we eventually added in V5.0.. that bodies are not supposed to be included in error responses. Some vendors have been very silly in their implementations including bodies on rejected bind_transmitter responses but not on bind_transceiver responses etc. The recommendation I would make to vendors.. as suggested above.. accept both variants. But its also wise to allow yourself issue NACKed submit_sm_resp and deliver_sm_resp PDUs with and without an empty body. In the case of these two PDUs, that empty body will look like a single NULL octet at the end of the stream. The reason you may need this ability to include what I call dummy bodies with NACKed requests is that the other side of the equation may be unable or unwilling to change their implementation to tolerate the missing body. (I worked on three versions of SMPP specification in Aldiscon/Logica and designed the ESME solution for Openmind Networks)

— Cormac Long

=== Message ID in SMPP 3.3 SMSC Delivery Receipts ===
The only way to pass delivery receipts in SMPP 3.3 is to put information in a text form to the short_message field; however, the format of the text is described in Appendix B of SMPP 3.4, although SMPP 3.4 may (and should) use receipted_message_id and message_state TLVs for the purpose. While SMPP 3.3 states that Message ID is a C-Octet String (Hex) of up to 8 characters (plus terminating '\0'), the SMPP 3.4 specification states that the id field in the Delivery Receipt Format is a C-Octet String (Decimal) of up to 10 characters. This splits SMPP implementations to 2 groups:

- Implementations using the decimal representation of an integer Message Id in the id field of the Delivery Receipt body and the hexadecimal representation of an integer Message Id in message_id and receipted_message_id fields
- Implementations using the same hexadecimal number (or even the same arbitrary string) both in message_id parameter and in the id field of the Delivery Receipt body

The SMPP 3.4 specification does however state that the delivery receipt format is SMSC vendor specific, and therefore the format included in the specification is merely one possibility. As noted above, when using SMPP 3.4 receipted_message_id and message_state TLVs should be used to convey the outcome of a message.

== Extensibility, compatibility and interoperability ==
Since introduction of TLV parameters in version 3.4, the SMPP may be regarded an extensible protocol. In order to achieve the highest possible degree of compatibility and interoperability any implementation should apply the Internet robustness principle: ″Be conservative in what you send, be liberal in what you accept″. It should use a minimal set of features which are necessary to accomplish a task. And if the goal is communication and not quibbling, each implementation should overcome minor nonconformities with standard:

- Respond with a generic_nack with command_status=3 to any unrecognised SMPP command, but do not stop the communication.
- Ignore any unrecognised, unexpected or unsupported TLV parameters.
- The borders of PDUs are always given by the PDUs' command_length field. Any message field must not exceed the end of PDU. If a field is not properly finished, it should be treated as truncated at the end of PDU, and it should not affect further PDUs.

Information applicable to one version of SMPP can often be found in another version of SMPP, for example with the case of SMPP 3.4 describing the only mechanism of delivery receipts in SMPP 3.3 described above.

== Security ==
The SMPP protocol is designed on a clear-text binary protocol which needs to be considered if using for potentially sensitive information such as one-time passwords via SMS. There are, however, implementations of SMPP over SSL/TLS if required.

== See also ==
- Universal Computer Protocol/External Machine Interface (UCP/EMI)
- Computer Interface for Message Distribution (CIMD)
- Rich Communication Services
