= EMI (protocol) =

External Machine Interface (EMI), an extension to Universal Computer Protocol (UCP), is a protocol primarily used to connect to short message service centres (SMSCs) for mobile telephones. The protocol was developed by CMG Wireless Data Solutions, now part of Mavenir.

== Syntax ==
A typical EMI/UCP exchange looks like this :

 ^B01/00045/O/30/66677789///1//////68656C6C6F/CE^C
 ^B01/00041/R/30/A//66677789:180594141236/F3^C

The start of the packet is signaled by ^B (STX, hex 02) and the end with ^C (ETX, hex 03). Fields within the packet are separated by / characters.

The first four fields form the mandatory header. the third is the operation type (O for operation, R for result), and the fourth is the operation (here 30, "short message transfer").

The subsequent fields are dependent on the operation. In the first line above, '66677789' is the recipient's address (telephone number) and '68656C6C6F' is the content of the message, in this case the ASCII string "hello". The second line is the response with a matching transaction reference number, where 'A' indicates that the message was successfully acknowledged by the SMSC, and a timestamp is suffixed to the phone number to show time of delivery.

The final field is the checksum, calculated simply by summing all bytes in the packet (including slashes) and taking the 8 least significant bits from the result.

The full specification is available on the LogicaCMG website developers' forum, but registration is required.

== Technical limitations ==
The two-digit transaction reference number means that an entity sending text messages can only have 100 outstanding messages (per session); this can limit performance, but only over a slow network and with incorrectly configured applications on one's SMSC (for example one session, with number of windows greater than 100). In practice it does not have any impact on delivery throughput.

The EMI UCP documentation does not specify a default alphabet for alphanumeric messages after decoding from hex digits. (It specifies an alphabet of IRA for the encoded message, which is the same as 7 bit ASCII as 0-9 and A-Z are invariant characters). The related ETS 300 133-3 standard specifies the GSM-7 alphabet, which accommodates more languages than ASCII by replacing unprintable control codes with additional printable characters. In practice the GSM-7 alphabet is used. Other encodings, such as UCS-2, can be sent by using a transparent message and specifying the Data Coding Scheme.

== Alternatives ==
- Short message peer-to-peer protocol (SMPP) also provides SMS over TCP/IP.
- Computer Interface for Message Distribution (CIMD) developed by Nokia
