= Lademacher =

Lademacher is a surname (North German standardized spelling of the surname Rademaker). Notable people with the surname include:

- Claire Lademacher (born 1985), see Princess Claire of Luxembourg
- Dany Lademacher (1950–2025), Belgian guitarist
- Hartmut Lademacher (born 1948), German entrepreneur, father of Claire
- Horst Lademacher (born 1931), German historian
