= Business Support and Control System =

Telecom billing and customer care platform

Business Support and Control System (BSCS) is a telecom billing and customer care platform originally developed by LHS Telekommunikation GmbH, a German company founded in 1990 by ex-IBM engineers Hartmut Lademacher, Jachim Hertel, and Rainer Zimmerman.

Following a series of mergers and acquisitions, including acquisition by Sema Group, Schlumberger, Atos, and finally Ericsson. The platform continued to evolve; it was enhanced and rebranded over the years, growing from a traditional postpaid billing engine into a real-time revenue management solution. Ericsson made it a core part of the CBiO (Charging & Billing in One) suite, enabling telecom operators to manage both prepaid and postpaid customers in a unified system. The platform’s strength and flexibility kept i relevant as a telecom revenue system. Currently, it is one of the most widely used billing systems in the telecom industry, particularly for mobile operators, named Ericsson Billing.

BSCS, and its various versions, was deployed by over 110+ telecom operators in 80+ countries, the product was mostly popular in Europe, Latin America, Middle East, Africa, and Asia, serving both Tier 1 and Tier 2 telecom operators. Back in december 2012, Ericsson announced that it has surpassed the 2 billion mark in the number of worldwide subscriptions served by its billing solutions (CBiO), which – according to the World Cellular Information Service (WCIS) database – is equivalent to a 31% market share of global subscriptions.

== Telecom areas ==
BSCS is a modular, scalable business support system (BSS) platform that supports telecom operators in handling:

- Mediation: Gathers and preprocesses usage data (CDRs) from network elements before rating. Modules: DIH, FIH and AIH.
- Rating: Applies tariffs and discounts to events like calls, data sessions, or content usage. Modules PRIH and RIH.
- Billing: Generates invoices for voice, data, SMS, roaming, and value-added services. Modules: RLH, BCH and BGH.
- Customer Care: Supports agent interfaces for customer management, service activation, account updates. Modules: CX and CMS.
- Product Management: Allows operators to define and manage complex pricing plans and service bundles. Modules: PX and RA.
- Finance: Handles payment external interfaces like SAP and others. Modules: PIH, PTH and IOH.
- Collections: Handles dunning, overdue payment workflows, and integration with credit bureaus. Modules: DCH and CAH.
- Provisioning: Enables the activation of SIM cards, IMEI and other device information on Network Elements in different market platforms and technologies (GSM, Voice mail, iDEN, Leased Line, IP, etc.). Modules: GMD, VMD and NPX.

== iX Series products ==
After BSCS 8, the Rating Package and Billing Package were modularized and could be installed as separated products. At MWC Barcelona 2009, LHS launched the iX Series, a range of next-generation business support system components that enable operators to rapidly roll out new services to their entire customer base. The new iX Series product portfolio comprises iX Rating and iX Billing, iX Mediation, and iX Recharge. With its iX Series products, the stand-alone business systems for tier-1 carriers that are designed to fit easily into their business environment.

- iX Rating: Real-time rating of usage events, CDR reading, rating and tariff taxation.
- iX Billing: Bill run, invoice generation, account settlement.
- iX Recharge: Support real-time and event-driven prepaid balance top-ups and recharges across telecom services.
- iX Collections: Debt and dunning management, automatic handling of debt collection.
- iX Customer Care: Agent interface and CRM.
- iX Mediation: CDR collection and normalization.
- NPX Network Provisioning Extension: Customizable provisioning interface.

== Architecture and technologies involved ==
BSCS operated on a client/server software platform. It uses Oracle database to persist information, Java-based modules with integration with SOAP/REST APIs, Data Queues, and external mediation devices and interfaces, like DUP programming language. Rating, Mediation, Provisioning and Billing were developed in ANSI C and C++ with PRO-C access to Oracle database. Interface and boundaries provisioning module uses EDIFACT files to communicate to external systems. The invoice creation and generation is highly customizable using XML format files.

Beginning in BSCS 7 version, the product development centres around the company’s ‘6 degrees of convergence’ methodology, which is as follows:

- Single Customer Care and Self Care, Partner Management – resulting in enhanced customer care efficiency and extending CRM to partner management
- Single Marketing View – reducing churn, and improving marketing by having no replication between the prepaid and postpaid databases
- Unified Services and Tariffs – all services are available to all subscribers, it is just a payment choice at the service level
- Integrated Balance Management – realtime balances maintained centrally with balance control at the service level
- Integrated Payments and Recharge – lowering costs and increasing revenue and customer service levels
- Consolidated Platforms and Technology – resulting in more efficient hardware, skills and maintenance costs.

Also introduced in BSCS 7 is the robust queue-based data distribution mechanism known as DaTa Queue, which is used to manage and route Usage Detail Records (UDR) and related processing files between modules. This mechanism plays a critical role in ensuring decoupled, scalable, and asynchronous communication across different subsystems—such as Mediation, Rating, Billing, Invoicing, and Collections.

In short, DaTa Queue is the backbone feature of BSCS internal processing architecture, allowing the system to efficiently handle millions of records instantly in a modular and fault-tolerant way. The UDR file format is patented data record metadata format (patent number WO2013129988A2) with standardized flat files/XML that uses metadata to determine routing and handling logic.

== BSCS versions ==
From 1990 to 2025, BSCS had many different versions and distinct product names. Currently BSCS does not exist as brand and it evolved to become Ericsson Billing.

Version	Company	Release date	Key Functionalities	Major New Features	Installed Customers
BSCS	LHS	1990	Basic postpaid billing, customer data management	Initial client-server architecture, CDR processing	
BSCS 2	LHS	1994	Improved rating and billing	First modular design attempts, enhanced CDR handling	
BSCS 3	LHS	1996	Basic support for GSM networks	Enhanced GUI, support for SIM-based subscriber ID	
BSCS 4	LHS	1997	Tariff flexibility, discounting	Multiple contract support, international language support	Amazonia Celular, Brazil; CTBC, Brazil; Fascel Ltd., India
BSCS 5	LHS	1999	Mature postpaid billing, hierarchical customer accounts	Monolithic client-server system for postpaid billing. Multi-currency, multi-taxation, improved user interface.	Telecentro Oeste, Brazil; TeleMig, Brazil; TM Cellular, Malasya; Nextel Peru; Nextel Mexico; Nextel Brasil; Nextel Argentina; Comcel, Colombia; Iusacell, Mexico
BSCS 6	Sema	2000	Large operator support, CRM features introduced	Account hierarchies, customizable workflows, prepaid integration begins.	TIM Brazil; TIM Peru
BSCS 7	SchlumbergerSema	2002	GSM/3G support, convergence begins; DaTA Queue and UDR metadata.	First real attempt at convergent billing (prepaid + postpaid), product catalog.	TIM Hellas, Greece; E-Plus, Germany; Conecel, Ecuador
BSCS 8	SchlumbergerSema	2003	True convergent billing system	Modular architecture, IP service support, advanced rating engine, CRM improvement.	Cosmote, Greece; Cosmote, Romania; Azercell Telecom, Azerbaijan; Sercom, Guatemala; Orascom Telecom, Tunisia; Wattanya, Kuwait; Turkcell, Turkey; Aktel, Bangladesh; Wattanya, Algerie; AMC Albania Mobile, Albania
BSCS iX R1	LHS	14-02-05	Modular, SOA-based convergent billing. New generation of fully convergent pre- and post-paid billing and customer care solutions.	BSCS iX R1 integrates prepaid/postpaid convergence, service bundling, and a unified product catalog through its Data Queue architecture. Built on LHS’ modular iX platform, it supports real-time billing and customer management, enabling gradual system replacement and seamless integration. Its components—iX Rating, iX Billing, and web-based customer/contract management—make BSCS the flagship solution for next-generation telecom operations.	OPT New Caledonia, France; StarHub, Singapore; Iusacell, Mexico; Du EITC, Dubai; BeST, Belarus; T-Mobile Poland
BSCS iX R2	LHS	2006	Enhanced scalability and workflow automation	iX Collections R2, customer segmentation, promise-to-pay, flexible dunning, SOAP/REST APIs	Nextel Peru; Nextel Mexico; Nextel Brazil; T-Mobile Makedonski Telcom, Macedonia; Telenor Serbia; Thuraya, UAE; Paltel, Palestine
BSCS iX R3	LHS	16-Feb-09	Unified user experience and policy integration, it provides end2end charging, billing, and customer care system. Its open stateoftheart architecture is highly business adaptive, enabling stepwise modular upgrades in line with changes to the business environment. This means that BSCS iX Release 3 can meet the endtoend requirements of entry level communication service providers with high growth potential or can easily be integrated into the complex IT environment of mature businesses with highly demanding large scale subscriber bases.	R3 introduces an improved GUI, policy control integration, faster rating, and advanced discount frameworks. It expands flexibility for wholesale and partner management while supporting all-IP service models. For the first time, it includes advanced reporting and business intelligence through SAP BusinessObjects™, highlighting the strategic value of billing data for performance analysis and decision-making.	Tunisiana GSM, Tunisia
BSCS iX R4	Ericsson	22-Feb-12	Virtualization readiness and operational efficiency, Convergent billing solution using a standard, business orientated SID based API. BSCS iX R4 is a convergent, end-to-end billing and customer care system for any type of communications service provider: mobile, fixed-line, broadband, TV etc. It's highly suited to service providers with a strong postpaid subscriber base.	Enhanced support for virtualized infrastructure, fraud management integration, real-time analytics. Integrated Telecom CRM, an integrated billing and customer relationship management product for the telecom industry based on Microsoft Dynamics CRM 2011. Designed to help operators deliver superior customer serv+E15ice as well as help telecoms operate more efficiently and cut costs.	Entel Chile; Bhutan Telecom, Bhutan
CBiO R1	Ericsson	2013	Ericsson Charging Billing in One	Combines components like BSCS iX, Ericsson Charging System (ECS), CRM, Product Catalog, and Order Management into one deployable stack	TMO USA
CBiO R2	Ericsson	2014	Ericsson Charging Billing in One		Zain, Kuwait; Zain, Saudi Arabia
CBiO R3	Ericsson	2015	Ericsson Charging Billing in One	Charging and Billing in One offers a flexible evolution path to convergence enabling CSPs to move to fully convergent BSS environment in a step wise fashion in-line with their specific business priorities and starting point, in terms of their existing IT environment.	Telenor Serbia
BSCS iX R16	Ericsson	2016	BSCS iX R16		
BSCS iX R17	Ericsson	2017	BSCS iX R17		A1 Serbia; America Movel Peru, Orange (GSCO) Morocco, Starhub LTD, Singapore
BSCS iX R18	Ericsson	2018	BSCS iX R18		Entel Peru; Orange Egypt; Al Madar, Libya; Etisalat UAE; Onati, French Polynesia; Orange (GSCO) Morocco; T-Mobile Austria
EB20	Ericsson	2020	Ericsson Billing offers flexible real-time billing with configurable Taxation, Multi-Tenancy, Multi-Currency support, Promotion Management, configurable Rounding Algorithms and Open Interfaces. The billing component can gather charges, relating to any service for a current settlement period – including those provided by MVNOs, content providers, digital partners, subsidiaries and others. It supports both batch and on-demand billing modes for customer and partner documents, and its split-billing capabilities allow separation of corporate and private invoices with different charging events based on flexible criteria.	This cloud-native solution is designed to meet the needs of modern 5G networks, supporting real-time billing for diverse use cases like pay-as-you-go, subscription services, and microtransactions. Providing greater flexibility and scalability to handle the growing number of devices and services.	Orange Egypt; Indosat, Indonesia; Telefonica O2, Czech Republic; Ooredoo Kuwait; DIGITEL Venezuela; Unified National Networks Brunei
EB21	Ericsson	2021	Ericsson Billing		Entel Chile; Entel Peru, La Poste Telecom, France; Thuraya, UAE; UNITEL AO Angola; Digital Nasional Berhad Malaysia
EB22	Ericsson	2022	Ericsson Billing		Orange Tunisie; Vodafone Egypt; Claro Colombia; Etisalat UAE
EB23	Ericsson	2023	Ericsson Billing	Full AWS Cloud support	Odido Netherlands; Cosmote Greece; Etisalat, UAE; Zain Kuwait; Odido Netherlands; Orange Tunisie; TIM Brasil; Zain Kuwait; ONATi SAS, French Polynesia
EB24	Ericsson	2024	Ericsson Billing		Al-Madar, Libya; ONATi, French Polynesia; T-Mobile Austria; Magenta Telecom (T-Mobile Austria)
EB25	Ericsson	2025	Ericsson Billing		Etisalat UAE, Makedonski Telekom, Odido Netherlands, Ooredoo Kuwait, Orange Belgium, Orange Jordan, Telekom Srbija, TIM Brasil, Inwi (WANA) Morocco, Unified National Networks Brunei, Orange France Télécom
EB26	Ericsson	2026	Ericsson Billing		Digitel Venezuela; STC Saudi Telecom; Watanya Algeria; Tunisiana; Vodafone Egypt; Orange Burkina Faso; STC MCN Saudi Telecom Company; Yettel Bulgaria
EB27	Ericsson	2027	Ericsson Billing	Future release	
