= CAP Scientific =

Software company in United Kingdom

- Logo designed by Paul Butler
- Industry: software
- Founded: 1979
- Headquarters: United Kingdom

CAP Scientific Ltd was a British defence software company, and was part of CAP (Computer Analysts and Programmers) Group plc. In 1988, CAP Group merged with the French firm Sema-Metra SA in 1988 as Sema Group plc. In 1991 Sema Group put most of its defence operations (CAP Scientific Ltd and YARD Ltd) into joint venture with British Aerospace called BAeSEMA, which British Aerospace bought out in 1998. Parts of the former CAP Scientific are now BAE Systems (Insyte).

== Formation of CAP Scientific ==
CAP Scientific was formed in 1979 by four colleagues who had previously worked in Scicon, a BP subsidiary. Seeking to start a specialist software company for defence applications in the United Kingdom, they approached CAP-CPP, a commercial software house, to back a start-up operation.

By 1985, CAP Scientific had established significant work in several areas. It had a strong naval business based on supporting the Admiralty Research Establishment. This Maritime Technology business applied the technologies fostered in research contracts on major development programmes. CAP worked with Vosper Thornycroft Controls to develop machinery control and surveillance systems for the Royal Navy's new generation ships and submarines.

An associated Naval Command Systems business had built a strong Action Information Organisation design team, working with both surface and submarine fleets, and a Land Air Systems business also took research and development contracts and was prime contractor for the British Army's Brigade and Battlegroup Trainer (BBGT). The non-defence scientific sector was addressed by setting a Scientific Systems business with expertise in energy generation and conservation. In that year, CAP Scientific established the Centre for Operational Research and Defence Analysis (CORDA) as an independent unit to provide impartial assistance for investment appraisal.

At that time military computer systems were purpose-built by major contractors, and CAP Scientific's strategy was to form joint ventures with companies which had market access but could not afford the investment to move into the new technology of microprocessors and distributed systems.

== The Falklands breakthrough, and DCG ==
In its early years, CAP Scientific took time to establish itself, but in 1982 there came a breakthrough. While the UK was mustering its naval taskforce for the Falklands War, it became clear that for some purposes the Royal Navy needed more computational power. An Urgent Operational Requirement was raised to provide improved fire control solutions for RN Sub-Harpoon. Working in frantic haste, CAP's engineers were able to add an experimental Digital Equipment Corporation PDP-8 installation into a Royal Navy submarine before she sailed to the South Atlantic. This was one of the first examples of commercial off-the-shelf equipment being employed for military use. The success of this experimental deployment led to the development of a standard RN submarine fit, DCG, which allowed extra processing power to be added to submarine command systems.

== SMCS and Gresham-CAP ==
By its prompt response to the needs of the Falklands War, CAP Scientific demonstrated its ability to supply naval computer technology. With the decision to build the new Vanguard-class submarine to carry the Trident missile system, the UK Ministry of Defence proceeded for the first time to run an open competition for the command system. In 1983, CAP Scientific teamed with Gresham-Lion, a British manufacturer of torpedo launch control equipment and now part of Ultra Electronics plc, to form a special purpose company, Gresham-CAP Ltd, to bid for the system. Up to that point all RN ships and submarines had command systems built by Ferranti using custom-built electronics. Gresham-CAP offered a novel distributed processing system based on commercial off-the-shelf components and utilising a modular software architecture largely written in the Ada programming language. The Gresham-CAP consortium won the bid, and their solution, known as Submarine Command System (SMCS) became the basis for subsequent products from the company.

The choice of Intel 80386 processors and MultiBus, when many competing chips were available and the PC had only recently reached the market, showed foresight as the basic architecture remains in service today on RN submarines. (The choice of an array of INMOS Transputer chips to process sonar tracking data was less successful - whilst they did the job, the lack of long-term support / future product line meant they have been phased out once general purpose processors were able to fulfill the role.)

The selection of a relatively new company over an established British electronics firm in the Royal Navy marked a notable shift in UK defense procurement, representing an early instance of open competition after a post-war period of preferred-contractor policies.

The founders of CAP Scientific sold their complete shareholding to CAP-CPP, which subsequently listed on the London Stock Exchange as CAP Group plc. In June 1986, the Group acquired YARD (Yarrow-Admiralty Research Department) Ltd, a marine engineering consultancy, formerly part of Yarrow Shipbuilders, based in Glasgow.

== DNA (SSCS) and Merger ==
The Falklands War prompted a further competition in British naval equipment supply when an analysis of the loss of HMS Sheffield showed that improvements were necessary in surface ship combat systems. A contract for the command system for the navy's new Type 23 frigates was cancelled and put out to competition, and after a long campaign was awarded to the CAP and Gresham consortium, teamed with Racal Electronics. The consortium developed the architecture of SMCS to create a derivative distributed system known internally as Surface-Ship Command System (SSCS). By now Gresham-Lion was under Dowty ownership and CAP Group had merged with the French company SEMA-METRA SA to form Sema Group plc.

The Type 23 command system proved to be a step too far for Sema Scientific, as it was now called. The enormous fixed-price contract overran, causing problems for both Sema and Dowty. Dowty was taken over by TI Group, who sold their interests in Dowty-Sema back to Sema Group for £1. Sema Group invited British Aerospace in as a co-investor in the business, and the activities which once formed CAP Scientific, Gresham-CAP and YARD, together with some BAe interests were merged in 1991 into a new entity, BAeSEMA. Ultimately, BAe purchased Sema Group's interest in BAeSEMA. Ironically, with the BAe/Marconi Electronic Systems merger to form BAE Systems in 1999, the CAP Scientific business found itself under the same parent as its erstwhile competitor Ferranti.
