= Telecommunications billing =

Telecommunications billing is the group of processes of communications service providers that are responsible to collect consumption data, calculate charging and billing information, produce bills to customers, process their payments and manage debt collection.

A telecommunications billing system is an enterprise application software designed to support the telecommunications billing processes.

Telecommunications billing is a significant component of any commercial communications service provider regardless specialization: telephone, mobile wireless communication, VoIP companies, mobile virtual network operators, internet service providers, transit traffic companies, cable television and satellite TV companies could not operate without billing, because it creates an economic value of their business.

== Telecommunications billing functions ==
Billing functions can be grouped to three areas: operations, information management, financial management. In the broad sense, when billing and revenue management (BRM) is considered as a single process bundle, as special functional areas could be picked out revenue assurance, profitability management, fraud management.

=== Operations ===
Operations area includes functions of capturing usage records (depending on the industry it can be call detail records, charging data records, network traffic measurement data, in some cases usage data could be prepared by telecommunications mediation system), rating consumption (determining factors, significant for further calculation, for example, calculating total time of calls for each tariff zones, count of short messages, traffic summary in gigabytes), applying prices, tariffs, discounts, taxes and compiling charges for each customer account, rendering bills, managing bill delivery, applying adjustments, maintaining of customer account.

Operations area functions implementation can vary significantly depending on communications type and payment model. In particular, for prepaid customers billing should be realized continuously (in near real-time computing standards, also noted as hot billing), and when a lower threshold amount at the account is reached, systems could automatically limit a service. In postpaid service model there are no vital requirements to decrease a balance of a customer account in real time, in this case charging scheduled to be rarely, usually, once per month.

=== Information management ===
Information management area unites functions that responsible to support customer information, product and service data, pricing models, including their possible combinations, as well as billing configuration data, such as billing cycles schedules, event triggers, bill delivery channels, audit settings, data archiving parameters. Customer information often integrated with customer relationship management system; collaboration with customer can be a function of information management area of billing system or can be completely allocated in CRM.

=== Financial management ===
Financial management area covers functions of payment tracking and processing, mapping correspondence between payments and consumed services, managing credits and debt collections, calculating company taxes.

== Convergent billing ==
Communication service providers, which operates with multiple services in multiple modes used to integrate in one bill all charges, unify customer management in one system. Term convergent billing system refers to such a solution, that could maintain single customer account and produce a single bill for all services (for example, it could be public switched telephone network, cable TV and cable internet services for one customer) and also do it regardless a payment method (prepaid or postpaid).

== Telecommunications billing systems market ==
A global market of the packaged telecommunications billing systems estimated to $6 Billion at 2007 and forecast to grow up to $7.2 Billion in 2012. Market shares by application specific as of 2007 were following:

- 27,2% — mobile postpaid;
- 16,4% — business billing for fixed networks;
- 13,3% — prepaid billing based on intelligent network for mobile;
- 10,9% — consumer billing for fixed networks;
- 9,7 % — cable and satellite billing;
- 8,8 % — convergent billing;
- 8,2 % — mediation billing;
- 4,6 % — interconnect billing.

As of 2010, market shares of billing systems by vendors were following:

- 27% — Amdocs, an Israeli company;
- 8 % — Huawei, a Chinese company;
- 6 % — Oracle Corporation, a USA company;
- 6 % — Convergys, a USA company;
- 5 % — Ericsson, a Swedish company (including LHS Telekommunikation BSCS, acquired in 2007);
- 5 % — Intec Telecom Systems, a UK middleman company.

== Sources ==
- Hunter, Jane M.; Thiebaud, Maud E. (2003). Telecommunications Billing Systems: Implementing and Upgrading for Profitability. Professional Telecommunications. New York City: McGraw-Hill. ISBN 978-0-07-140857-8.
