= BSCS =

BSCS may refer to:

- Biological Sciences Curriculum Study, an educational center
- Bachelor of Science in Computer Science
- Bradley Stoke Community School in the United Kingdom
- Black Sea Coastal States, Bulgaria, Georgia, Romania, Russia, Turkey, and Ukraine
- Business Control and Support Systems, mobile telecom billing system
