= Barney Gibbens =

IT businessman (1935 – 2012)

Barnaby John ("Barney") Gibbens OBE (17 April 1935 – 4 June 2012) was a British businessman in the field of IT. He was a co-founder of the CAP Group (later the Sema Group) in 1962 and founding Master of the Worshipful Company of Information Technologists in 1987.

He was educated at Winchester College. He was President of the UK Computing Services Association (1975), Chairman of the UK Computing Services Industry Training Council (1984–94) and IT Industry Lead Body (1987–94), Director of the UK National Computing Centre (1987–90), member of the UK National Council for Vocational Qualifications (1989–92), and Chairman of the Skin Treatment and Research Trust (START) (1990–2008). He retired as Chairman of the Sema Group in 1991.

Gibbens was elected a Fellow of the British Computer Society (FBCS) in 1970, a Fellow of Chartered Accountants (FCA) in 1972 and a Fellow of the Royal Society of Arts (FRSA) in 1993. He was awarded an OBE in 1989.
