= CAP Group =

Software company in United Kingdom

- CAP logo (1974).
- Company type: Public limited company
- Industry: Software house
- Founded: May 1962; 64 years ago as Computer Analysts and Programmers Ltd (CAP)
- Founder: Alex d’Agapeyeff, Barney Gibbens, Harry Baecker
- Fate: Merged with Sema-Metra in 1988 to form Sema Group
- Headquarters: United Kingdom
- Products: Business Operating System

Alex d'Agapeyeff – co-founder and chairman of CAP.

CAP Group was a British software house. Computer Analysts and Programmers Ltd (CAP) was founded in May 1962 and grew to be one of the foremost IT companies in the UK before merging with French company Sema-Metra in 1988 to form Sema Group.

== History of CAP Group ==
Computer Analysts and Programmers Ltd (CAP) was founded by Alex d'Agapeyeff, Barney Gibbens, and Harry Baecker in May 1962 and chaired by d’Agapeyeff for the following 20 years.

CAP initially worked on compilers and system software. Its first job was the creation of a version of ALGOL for the English Electric KDF6 computer, and later the Elliott 503. During the 1960s it produced CORAL compilers and a real time operating system for the Royal Navy.

d'Agapeyeff coined the term 'middleware' to describe the interface between application and system software at a presentation to a NATO conference in 1968.

By 1974, CAP operated three divisions – commercial, financial, and industrial – which covered mainframe and minicomputer systems and industrial control systems. It had offices in London, Reading, and Alderley Edge (Cheshire).

In 1975, CAP UK split from CAP Europe, a partnership formed in 1966 with CAP France, which was a separately-founded company. The name 'CAP' in Europe remained with CAP Gemini Sogeti. CAP UK formed CAP International, which operated outside Europe and had several branches in the Middle East.

In the mid 1970s, d'Agapeyeff recognised the potential of microprocessors and the newly developed microcomputers. He created BOS (Business Operating System), a portable environment to run commercial software on the emerging microcomputers. In 1976, CAP Microsoft was formed to market services based on BOS and MicroCobol.

In 1978, CPP (Computer Program Products) was formed to sell IBM mainframe products and subsequently CAP was renamed CAP-CPP to distinguish itself from the European CAP, but later it changed to CAP Group.

CAP Scientific, which did defence-related work, was formed in 1979.

By the late 1980s, CAP Group PLC consisted of the following:

- CAP Financial Services Ltd, with offices in London and Watford.
- CAP Industry Ltd, with offices in Reading, London, Wilmslow, Manchester and the Netherlands.
- CAP Scientific Ltd, with offices in London and Dorchester.
- YARD Ltd, with offices in Charing Cross Tower in Glasgow, Chippenham, Aberdeen, Bristol, and Bath. YARD Ltd and YARD International Ltd became part of CAP Group when CAP merged with Yarrow PLC in mid-1986.
  - YARD International Ltd, with offices in London, Canada and the USA.
  - CORDA Ltd was a business unit jointly owned by CAP Scientific and YARD.
- Data Networks Ltd, with offices in Tipton and London.
- Baddeley Associates Ltd, with offices in Cambridge.

In the late 1980s, 84% of CAP's turnover was in the UK, and 16% overseas. The turnover by market was:

- Science and engineering 37.7%
- Industry 31.2%
- Financial services 17.7%
- Information services 13.4%

	1983	1984	1984	1986	1987
Turnover	£20.0m	£26.3m	£36.5m	£50.6m	£78.8m
Profit before taxation	£0.965m	£1.322m	£2.121m	£2.707m	£5.825m
Average staff numbers	892	1,082	1,294	1,579	2,321

In 1988, CAP merged with Sema-Metra, a French company and the merged group was called Sema Group. The name 'CAP' was dropped because it could not be used in Europe.
