= AS-90 =

British 155 mm self-propelled howitzer

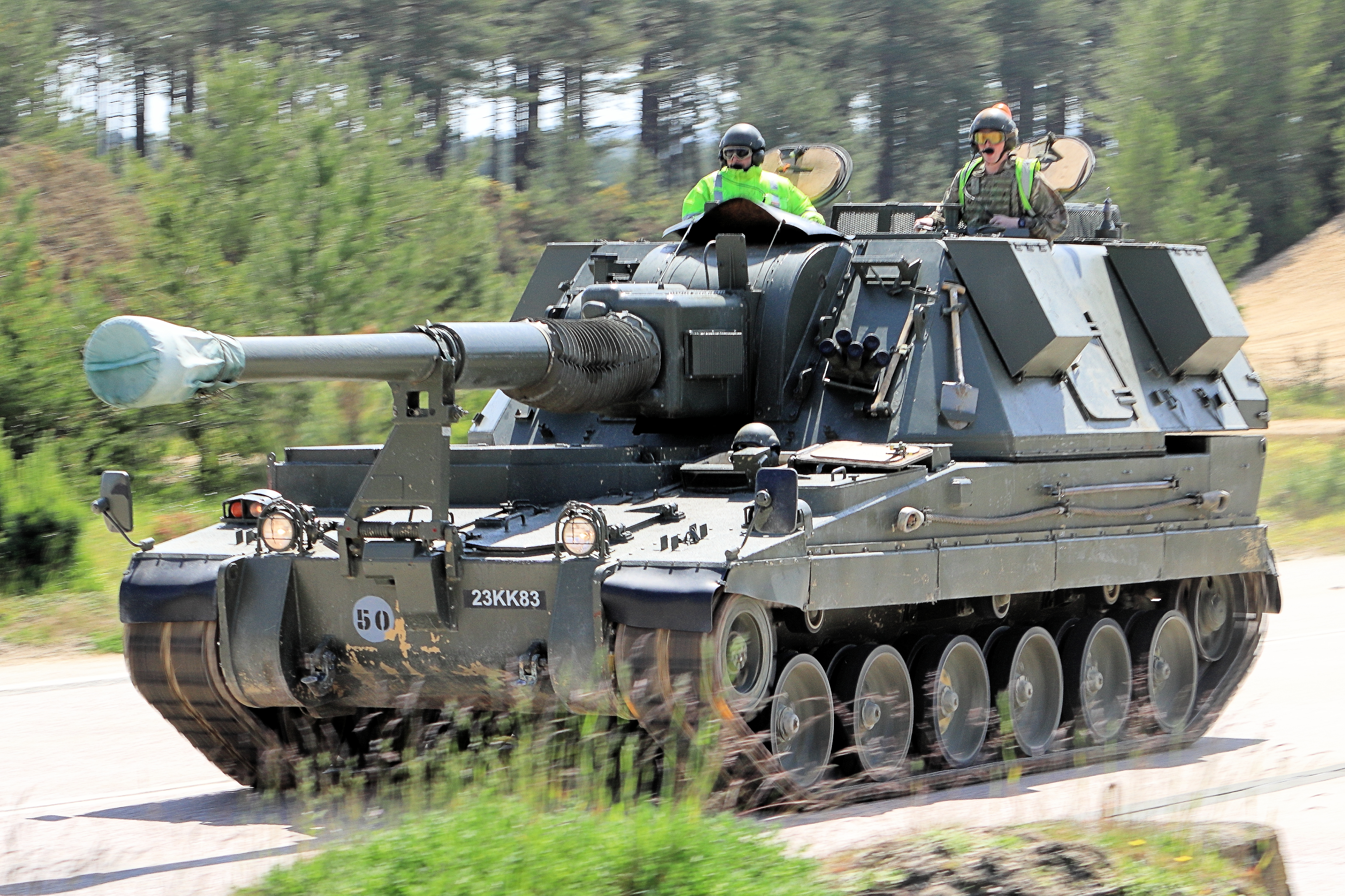
- AS-90 in Hertfordshire
- Type: Self-propelled howitzer
- Place of origin: United Kingdom

Service history
- In service: 1992–present
- Used by: See Operators
- Wars: Yugoslav Wars (peacekeeping); Iraq War; Russo-Ukrainian War

Production history
- Designed: 1982–1987
- Manufacturer: Vickers Shipbuilding and Engineering Limited
- Produced: 1992–1995
- No. built: 179
- Variants: See Variants

Specifications
- Mass: 45 t (44 long tons; 50 short tons)
- Length: 9.9 m (32 ft 6 in) overall; 7.2 m (23 ft 7 in) hull
- Barrel length: 6.022 m (19 ft 9.1 in) L/39
- Width: 3.4 m (11 ft 2 in)
- Height: 3 m (9 ft 10 in)
- Crew: 5
- Calibre: 155 mm (6.1 in)
- Barrels: L31 ordnance with double-baffle muzzle brake
- Breech: Split-block
- Recoil: 2 diametrically opposed buffers & 1 recuperator 800 mm (31 in) max length
- Elevation: +1,244 mils (+70°) elevation -89 mils (-5°) depression
- Traverse: 6,400 mils (360°)
- Rate of fire: 3 rds/< 10 seconds – burst; 6 rds/min for 3 mins – intense; 2 rds/min – sustained
- Effective firing range: 24.7 km (15.3 mi) standard ammunition
- Armour: All-welded steel armour 17 mm (0.67 in) max thickness
- Main armament: BAE Systems' 155 mm L/39 (48 rounds)
- Secondary armament: 7.62 mm L7 Machine Gun
- Engine: Cummins VTA-903T-660; 14.8 L (900 cu in) V8 diesel 490 kW (660 hp) at 2,800 rpm
- Drive: Tracked
- Transmission: ZF Friedrichshafen LSG 2000; Automatic 4F2R
- Suspension: Hydropneumatic
- Ground clearance: 410 mm (16 in)
- Fuel capacity: 750 L (160 imp gal)
- Operational range: 370 km (230 mi)
- Maximum speed: 55 km/h (34 mph)
- References: Janes

The AS-90 ("Artillery System for the 1990s"), known officially as Gun Equipment 155 mm L131, is an armoured self-propelled howitzer formerly used by the British Army and subsequently donated for use by the Ukrainian Army.

It can fire standard charges up to 24.7 km (15.3 mi) using 39-calibre long barrel and 30 km (19 mi) with 52-calibre long barrel. The maximum rate of fire is 3 rounds in 10 seconds (burst); 6 per minute for 3 minutes (intense); and 2 per minute for 60 minutes (sustained).

== History ==
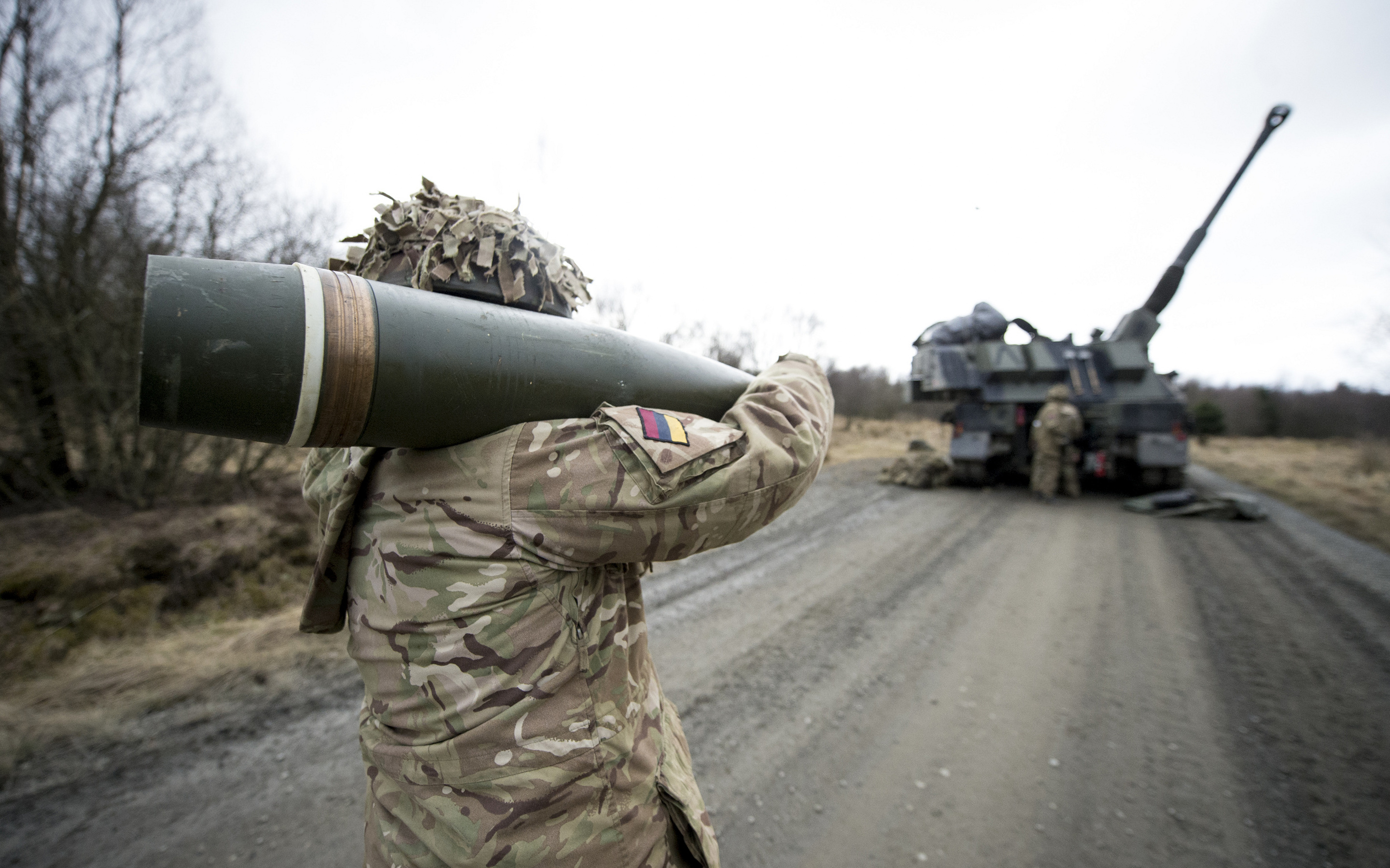
Crew member with AS-90 shell

AS-90 started in the mid-1980s as a private venture on the gamble that the tri-national SP70 would fail. When this did occur, the Ministry of Defence (MoD) issued a cardinal point specification on one page for a new 155 mm self-propelled gun. The MoD was also required to consider the US "Paladin", an upgraded M109 howitzer.

AS-90 was designed and built by the armaments division of Vickers Shipbuilding and Engineering (VSEL). Between 1992 and 1995, VSEL supplied 179 vehicles at a cost of £300 million ($480 million). The AS-90 was first deployed by the British Army in 1993. The AS-90s were acquired to re-equip six of the eight self-propelled field artillery regiments (each of 24 guns) in the I (BR) Corps, replacing the 105 mm FV433 Abbot and older M109 155 mm Self Propelled Gun and FH70 towed howitzer. In 1999, VSEL became a part of BAE Systems.

In 1999, Marconi Electronic Systems was contracted to upgrade British Army AS-90s to include a 52 calibre gun in order to increase the range of the artillery. Critical to the programme was a bi-modular charge system from Somchem of South Africa (selected after extensive trials of ammunition from many suppliers), which offered greatly reduced barrel wear. However, this ammunition failed to meet the requirement for insensitive munitions and the project was terminated.

The MoD undertook studies in 2006–09 to "up-gun" the Royal Navy's main shipboard gun armament, the 4.5 inch Mark 8 naval gun, to accept 155 mm ammunition from the AS-90. This would have introduced a common gun calibre for the British Army and Royal Navy, helping with ammunition logistics, and encouraging joint Army-Navy development of extended-range and precision-guided shells. The development of this gun for the Royal Navy was stopped due to budget cuts in the Strategic Defence and Security Review 2010.

In 2008 and 2009, a capability enhancement programme primarily upgraded AS-90's electronic system.

In 2008, there were 134 AS-90 in service further reduced to 117 by 2015. By April 2016, there were 89 AS-90 in active service. This was how it remained until the beginning of Russian invasion of Ukraine in 2022.

The initial expected out-of-service date for the AS-90 had been 2030, but this was later delayed to 2032 with a replacement planned to enter service in 2029. The Russian invasion of Ukraine in 2022 changed these plans.

On 24 April 2022, the Daily Express reported that AS-90s and 45,000 artillery rounds would be sent to Ukraine but that was subsequently denied by Defence Secretary Ben Wallace. On 14 January 2023, British Prime Minister Rishi Sunak announced that Britain would send 30 AS-90 to Ukraine, amongst other supplies (including 14 Challenger 2 tanks), for use in the ongoing Russo-Ukrainian War.

To fill the gap in British Army artillery left by the donation, the UK government announced they were buying 14 Archer Artillery Systems in March 2023. The deal was negotiated in just eight weeks as part of the Urgent Operational Requirement procurement process; the first vehicles were planned to be fully operational by April 2024. The purchase was meant to fill a hole in capabilities until a new system would be decided upon as part of the Mobile Fires Platform programme, where Archer was a competitor. On April 23, 2024 the UK government announced that the AS-90 would be replaced by the RCH 155.

In 2025 it was reported in defence news websites that all British AS-90 had been donated to Ukraine and the British Army had ended its usage of AS-90.

== Design ==
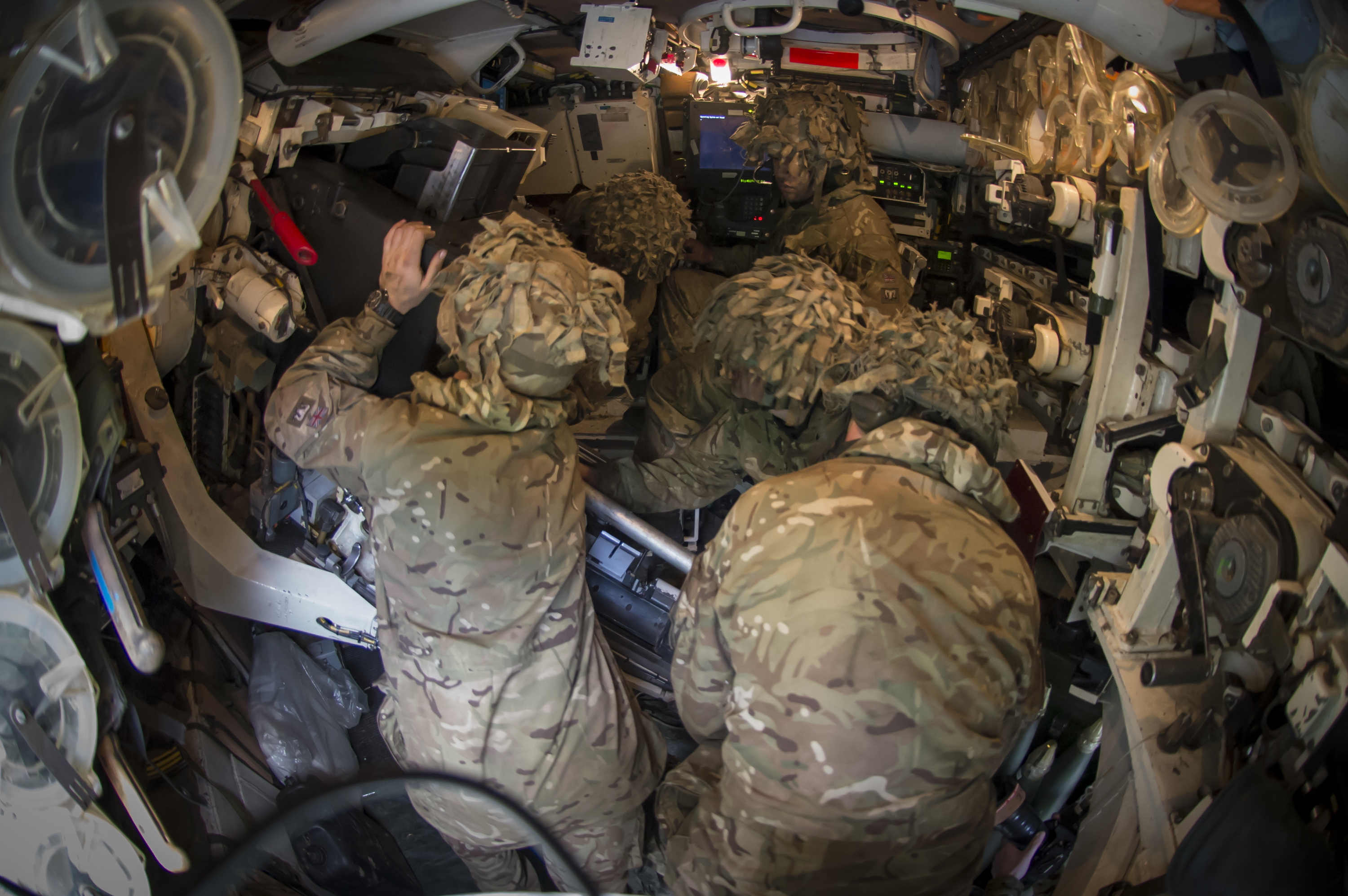
Inside AS-90 on Exercise Steel Sabre, 2015

In 1963 certain NATO nations, including the UK, agreed to a "Ballistics Memorandum of Understanding" for a 155 mm 39 calibre ordnance and a baseline projectile with the shape used for the US M549 rocket-assisted shell. The AS-90 uses a conforming 39 calibre barrel which fires the L15 unassisted projectile out to a range of 24.7 km (15.3 mi). However, this was a new design of ordnance using a split sliding block breech with Crossley obturation, instead of the more usual screw breech, to permit bagged charges (no metal cartridge cases). The breech mechanism has a primer magazine holding 18 primers. The standard ammunition is that designed for FH-70 (L15 HE and associated propelling charges) although in training the less effective but cheaper M107 with Green and White propelling charges is used.

It is fitted with an auxiliary power unit to eliminate the need to run the main engine to keep the batteries charged while stationary; electrical servos drive the automated elevation, traverse, magazine, shell transfer arm and loader as well as power for electronics and communications.

The vehicle is fitted with an autonomous navigation and gun laying dynamic reference unit (DRU) mounted on the trunnion. All main turret functions are controlled by a Turret Control Computer (TCC) with control and display units for the No 1 (Detachment Commander), No 2 (loader) and No 3 (layer). The combination of the DRU, TCC and powered laying controls provide autolaying. Every gun is fitted with a radar Muzzle Velocity Measuring Device. Reversionary mode laying uses deflection laying via the direct fire sight.

The gun can be brought into action fully closed down; the barrel can be clamped and unclamped from within the vehicle. In-to and out-of action times are less than one minute.

The gun is compatible with the extended-range guided projectile M982 Excalibur.

== Combat history ==
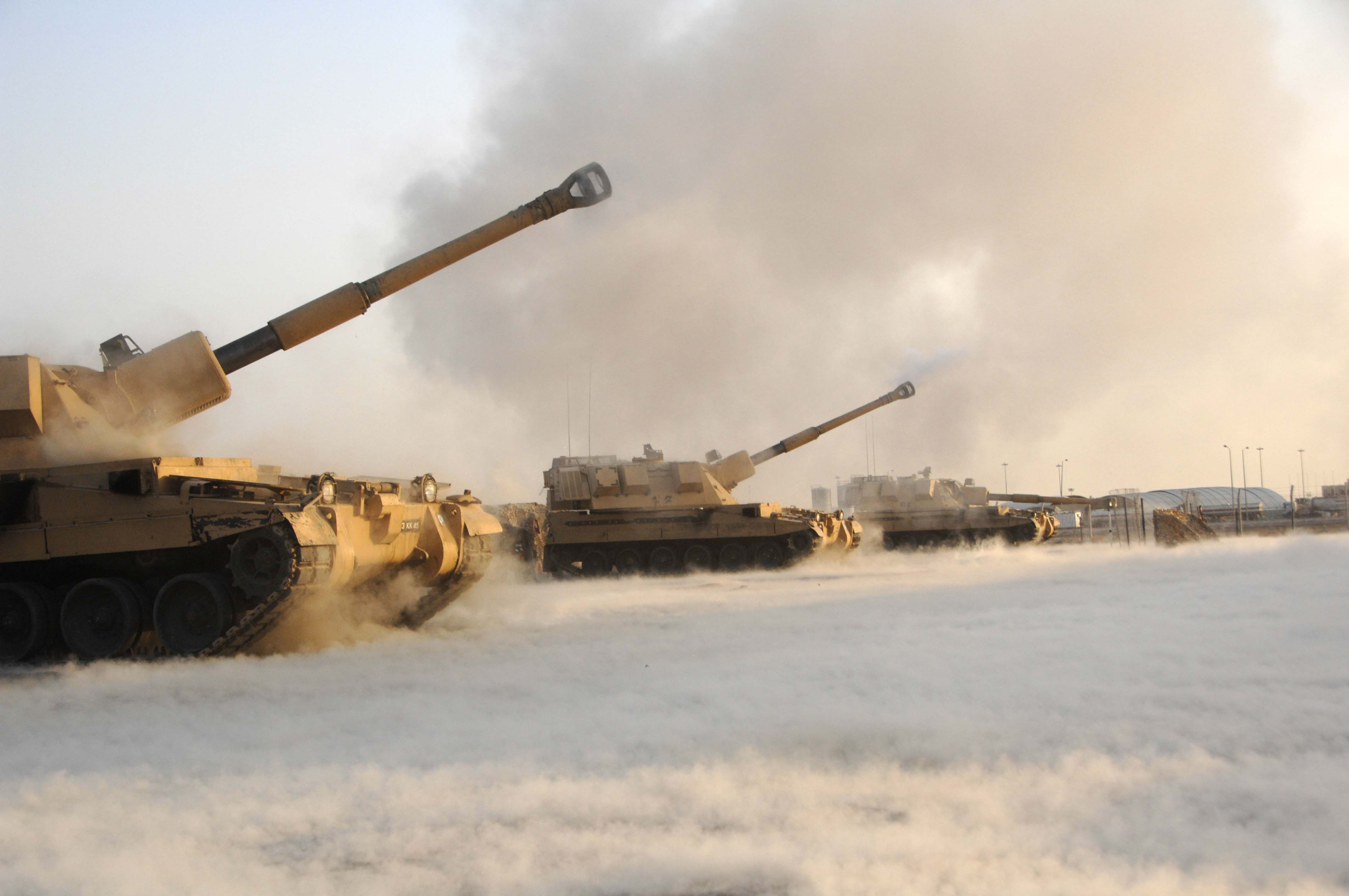
AS-90s deployed in Iraq

The AS-90 was deployed in Bosnia and Kosovo in the 1990s to support NATO peacekeeping efforts during the Yugoslav Wars. 32 AS-90s were also deployed during the 2003 Iraq War. Speaking of their capability, Commander of the British land component, General Brims, commented that "the phenomenal accuracy of it, [was] way beyond anything that one might have expected". AS-90s were used to shell Iraqi mortar positions during the Battle of Basra, one of the opening battles of the conflict. In October 2003, Defence Minister Adam Ingram stated it had a 92% availability rate during the war.

=== Ukraine ===
A total of 20 battle-ready AS-90s and 12 non-functional spares were donated to Ukraine by the UK in 2023 during the Russian invasion of Ukraine, with first combat usage in June 2023. According to Ukrainian forces, the AS-90 outperformed their existing Soviet-era artillery systems, such as the 2S1 Gvozdika and 2S3 Akatsiya, in both range and accuracy. In July 2024, the UK Ministry of Defence announced a new package of support for Ukraine including 10 AS-90s and support for previously gifted ones. In May 2025 it was reported that the UK's entire AS-90 fleet of 68 vehicles had been donated to Ukraine and thus the British Army had ended its usage of AS-90.

As of July 2025, Oryx blog recorded Ukrainian losses at 19 units (13 destroyed and 6 damaged).

== Specifications ==
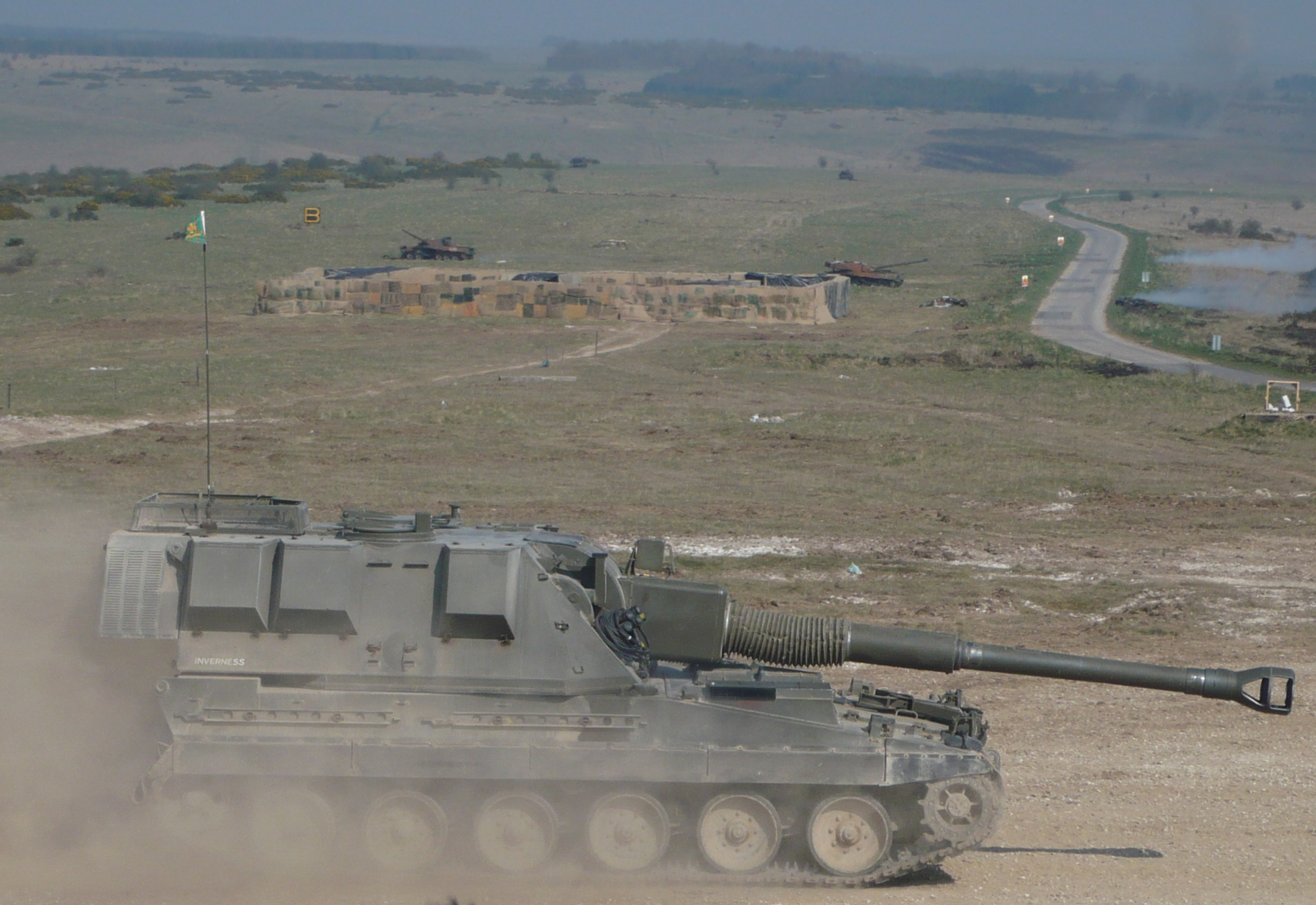
AS-90 on Salisbury Plain

- Crew: 5, onboard when moving (driver plus 4 gun detachment), full gun detachment 10 including driver, 4 detachment members in the turret.
- Length: 9.07 m
- Width: 3.3 m
- Height: 3 m
- Armour: 17 mm (maximum, steel)
- Weight: 45 tons
- Calibre: 155 mm
- Range: 24.7 km (15.3 mi) (39 cal) standard charges, 30 km (19 mi) (52 cal) 52-calibre long barrel
- Rate of fire: 3 rounds in 10 seconds (burst), 6 rounds per minute for 3 minutes (intense), 2 rounds per minute for 60 minutes (sustained)
- Secondary armament: 7.62 mm L7 GPMG
- Ammunition carried: 48 projectiles and charges (31 turret and 17 hull), 1000 MG rounds
- Main engine: Cummins VTA903T 660 bhp 90 degree V8, 4 stroke, liquid cooled, turbo diesel
- Max speed: 55 km/h (34 mph) (Road)
- Vehicle range: 370 km (230 mi) (Road)
- Ground clearance: 0.41 m; Gradient: 60°; Vertical obstacle: 0.75 m; Trench crossing: 2.8 m; Fording depth: 1.5 m

== Variants ==
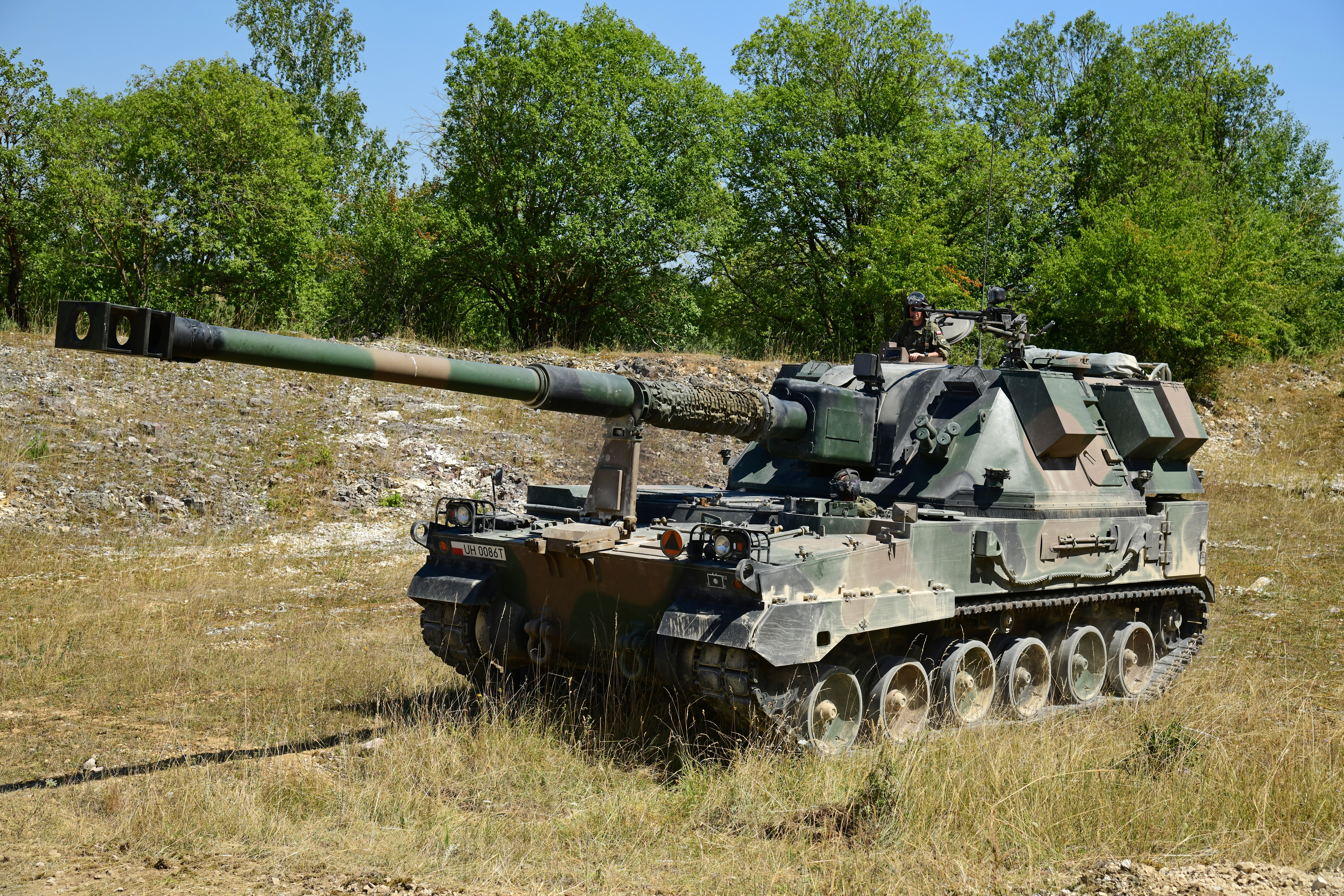
AHS Krab

AS-90D

Modified for desert use. Thermal protection for crew and extra cooling for engine and machinery. Tracks adapted for reduced wear in sandy conditions.

AS-90 Braveheart

AS-90 fitted with 52-calibre main gun. The project was terminated due to non-compliant propellant charges.

AHS Krab – (Armatohaubica Krab, Cannon-howitzer crab)

Licensed Braveheart turret on a South Korean K9 Thunder self-propelled howitzer chassis, with Polish Azalia BMS. Designed and integrated in Poland, by Huta Stalowa Wola and WB Electronics. Two Krab prototypes were built in 2001, and successfully completed all required evaluations and state acceptance trials. Initial serial production started in 2008, with eight units delivered to the Polish Land Forces for testing on a locally built chassis. In 2014 production of the Krab chassis was forwarded to Samsung Techwin, which agreed to provide 120 units, replacing the Polish-built UPG chassis in series production vehicles.

== Operators ==
=== Current operators ===
- Ukraine: Ukrainian Ground Forces received 68 AS artillery systems + spares were donated by the United Kingdom (of which 29 have been recorded by Oryx as destroyed or damaged during the Russo-Ukrainian War).

=== Former operators ===
- (United Kingdom) British Army: 68 AS-90 donated to Ukraine, the rest in storage.
