= Princess Claire =

Princess Claire may refer to two people:

- Princess Claire of Belgium (born 1974)
- Princess Claire of Luxembourg (born 1985)
