= Rademaker =

Rademaker is a Dutch occupational surname. It originally meant wheelwright or wainwright. A large number of spelling variations are in use. The most common are (Netherlands and Belgium in 2007 combined):

- Raaijmakers (4086)
- Raaymakers (301)
- Rademaker (3094)
- Rademakers (2037)
- Raemaekers (939)
- Raeymaekers (2112)
- Raijmakers (1398)
- Ramaekers (3244)
- Ramaker (2122)
- Ramakers (2058)
- Raymakers (504)

== Rademaker(s) ==
- Abraham Rademaker (1677–1735), Dutch painter and printmaker
- Augusto Rademaker (1905–1985), Brazilian navy admiral and vice-president
- Fons Rademakers (1920–2007), Dutch filmmaker and actor
- Lili Rademakers (born 1930), Dutch film director, wife of Fons
- Richard Rademaker (born 1982), Dutch volleyball player
- Roland Rademaker (born 1983), Dutch volleyball player (twin brother)
- Sperry Rademaker (1939–2005), American sprint canoer
- Stephen Rademaker (born 1959), American attorney and lobbyist

== Raaijmakers/Raaymakers ==
- Dick Raaijmakers (1930–2013), Dutch composer, theater producer and theorist
- Ronald Raaymakers (born 1990), New Zealand rugby player

== Raemaekers/Raemakers ==
- Hector Raemaekers (1883–1963), Belgian footballer
- Louis Raemaekers (1869–1956), Dutch painter and cartoonist
- Rens Raemakers (born 1991), Dutch politician

== Raeymaeckers ==
- Jürgen Raeymaeckers (born 1985), Belgian footballer

== Raijmakers/Raymaker(s) ==
- Herman C. Raymaker (1893–1944), American film director and actor
- Piet Raijmakers (born 1956), Dutch equestrian

== Ramackers ==
- Josée Vigneron-Ramackers (1914–2002), Belgian music educator, conductor and composer

== Ramaekers ==
- Serge Ramaekers (born 1966), Belgian DJ

== See also ==
- Lademacher surname
