= Business Operating System (software) =

- Developer: CAP Ltd
- Written in: BOS/MicroCobol (based on COBOL with some similarities to Pascal)
- OS family: p-code operating systems
- Working state: Active
- Initial release: 1980; 46 years ago
- Latest release: GSMSP44 / 24/03/2026
- Available in: English
- Supported platforms: Intel 8080, Motorola 6800, Zilog Z80, PDP-11, VAX, IBM Series/1
- Kernel type: p-code virtual machine
- Default user interface: Command-line interface

The Business Operating System, or BOS, was initially developed as an early cross-platform operating system, originally for Intel 8080 and Motorola 6800 microprocessors and then for actual businesses and business models. The technology was used in Zilog Z80-based computers and later for most microcomputers of the 1980s. The system was developed by CAP Ltd, a British company that later became one of the world's largest information technology consulting firms. BOS and BOS applications were designed to be platform-independent.

Via a management buyout (MBO) in 1981, BOS was spun off to three interlinked companies, MPSL (MicroProducts Software Ltd) which looked after the sales and marketing of BOS, MPPL (MicroProducts Programming Ltd) which looked after both the development of BOS and various horizontal software packages, and MicroProducts Training Ltd. BOS was distributed on a global basis, mainly to the United States and the British Commonwealth, by a variety of independent and MPSL-owned companies.

A popular version was implemented on the Sage/Stride 68000 family based computers, and sold well in Australia. The Sage itself was initially developed using UCSD Pascal and p-code, so it fit well with the basic BOS design.

The small BOS dealer/distributor network as well as the system's command-line interface contributed to its decline, especially as this was at a time when graphical user interfaces (GUIs) were becoming popular. In 2013, the system was provided with an integrated GUI in order to provide a "simple to use" solution, which "learned" from its user's input.

MPSL developed numerous products for BOS, generally targeting horizontal markets, leaving vertical (industry-specific) markets to independent software vendors (ISVs). Examples of MPSL developed software include BOS/Finder (database), BOS/Planner (spreadsheet), BOS/Writer (word processor) and BOS/AutoClerk (report generator). Companies sold various BOS accounting software suites in the UK and United States. In the UK, BOS accounting packages were considered to be the industry standard by some accountants.

The accounts software was split into four sections: Sales Ledger, Invoices, Purchase Ledger, Daybook and Journal Entries. Data entry and ledger reports were compatible with the Autoclerk report generator. This feature was especially favoured by accountants and tax officials as it meant that a consultant could sit down with a programmer/operator of the BOS system to plan out and ensure that accounting information was presented in exactly the right way for official acceptance. In the early adoption of business microcomputers not having accounts correctly laid out was one of the biggest complaints by tax officials.

An interesting feature of the command line input was the use of the Esc key for line entry. This freed up the ENTER key (also called RETURN, as per typewriter keyboards) to allow the input of long lines of code and long spans of data entry.

BOS had its own job control language, named BOS/JCL. This made it easy to delegate otherwise complex operator tasks to non-technical office and shop-floor staff, especially given the intricacies of working with multiple floppy disks.

BOS applications were initially compiled to a p-code and interpreted as they ran. BOS had a p-code interpreter so efficient that programs, even the BOS/Writer word processor, ran sufficiently fast to satisfy users. A technical subsystem of the system programming software was made available to programmers wanting to write their own p-code microcobol instruction extensions. Apart from a 2-kilobyte (Kb) server (computing)/host kernel, BOS is written in BOS/MicroCobol, a language based on COBOL but with system-level programming constructs added and elements of structured programming, which bore a vague similarity to Pascal. In recent computing, programming languages such as Java have re-introduced the concept of p-code "virtual machines". As the BOS system evolved, the need for programming in ASP.net developed for quicker accessibility and cloud computing. Harrell & Son took the next steps to bring BOS back into the picture on a larger scale.

BOS initially required 48 Kb of RAM and two 176 Kb 5.25" double-sided floppy disks, though it was more commonly deployed on machines equipped with 64 kilobytes of RAM and a hard drive. A computer with 128 KB RAM and a 10-megabyte (MB) hard drive could run as many as five concurrent users. When the IBM PC XT came out in 1983, BOS served over eight concurrent dumb terminals on it. At the time, this made BOS very attractive. Now, BOS runs on the same required RAM and serves up to 800,000 concurrent users as it is paired with cloud computing.

In the early 1980s, a minimum hardware BOS configuration might have comprised: North Star Horizon Z80 cpu 48Kbyte ram & 2x 5.25" SA-400 single-density double-sided minifloppy drive (each side used 35/40 tracks to give 176 Kb formatted, ie. BOS used the North Star NSDOS file system), Lynx 24x80 green vdu, DEC LA120 lineprinter/typewriter. Frequent diskette swapping was required during a program run, a good programmer/operator could minimise these essential changes by detailed logical planning. Not every business could quickly afford the newly available hard drives and many company managers were just reluctant to spend more and more upon what they already thought was expensive enough in the first place. Getting an accounts system up and running often involved countless hours poring over thousands of pages of illegible and inaccurate hand-written accounts in traditional ledger books. This is where the journal entry features came in really useful in order to bypass having to enter thousands of useless historical records, it was possible to reach an agreement with the accountants as to what figures should be given an initial fudge factor in order to artificially balance the software ledgers prior to going live with the new accounts system. The software was flexible enough to allow internal adjustments to data. The genius of CAP, or CAP-CPP as it was more correctly called, was to anticipate these technical problems and the initial reservations of a suspicious middle-management, and this was essentially the success of BOS.

With user-management tools in the 1980s, and application programming interfaces in the mid-1980s, BOS was considered an alternative even to the platform-specific operating systems on machines such as the PDP-11 and the VAX. The reemergence of BOS has escalated the number of users requested to be entered into the PMM system, and may require consistent server updating.

Despite, or because of, its command-line interface, BOS remains popular with medium to large organizations in the UK and US.

== See also ==
- Haiku (operating system)
