= CORDA (company) =

Software company in United Kingdom

- Type: Subsidiary (LTD)
- Industry: Arms industry
- Founded: 1985
- Parent: BAE Systems

CORDA is a small analysis and management consultancy company, owned by BAE Systems and based in Farnborough. It provides evidence-based decision support to BAE Systems, government departments, and other commercial organisations.

== History ==
CORDA was founded in 1985 as part of CAP Scientific (part of the CAP Group). At the time CORDA stood for: Centre for Operational Research and Defence Analysis. As with other parts of CAP Group, it became part of the Anglo-French SEMA Group in 1988. In 1991 it became part of BAeSEMA, a company jointly owned by SEMA Group and British Aerospace. It became part of British Aerospace in 1998, and BAE Systems in 1999.

== Type of work undertaken ==
=== Simulations ===
CORDA builds computer simulations, and uses them for operational analysis studies. In the late 1980s CORDA produced a simulation called FASTAID that was used by the Royal Army Medical Corps to help train soldiers to make decisions about dispatching ambulances. An improved and updated version of this tool was developed for Operation GRANBY and delivered by CORDA staff to troops in the field.

=== Soft OA ===
CORDA has used a variety of soft operational analysis techniques such as drama theory, matrix gaming, wargaming, and political cards gaming in studies. For instance in 2002, they used matrix gaming in conjunction with cost modelling done by HVR to look at the use of unmanned underwater vehicles for Ministry of Defence. In November 2008, "CORDA provided both an interactive symposium on 'political cards' and a presentation on 'the application of war gaming and combat modelling in support of defence decision making' at the war gaming and combat modelling course... run by the Defence Academy at Shrivenham."

=== Historical studies ===
Historical analysis is an operational analysis tool used to take account of human factors. CORDA has undertaken historical analysis studies for the UK Ministry of Defence, these include studies of friendly fire in the land battle from World War II to Operation TELIC conducted from at least 1994 to 2004. Other areas of study have included casualty and sickness rates, and campaign level studies to validate current MoD models.

=== Support to the armed forces on operations ===
CORDA has provided operational analysis support to the armed forces on operations in support of Operation GRANBY, in the Balkans, and in Northern Ireland.

=== Fast response studies for Ministry of Defence ===
From 2001 - 2010, CORDA provided fast response studies for the Director Equipment Capability (DEC) in the Underwater Battlefield Capability Area of the UK Ministry of Defence. CORDA was involved in the day-to-day business of the DEC including cost/capability measurement, weapon and sensor capability evaluation across the whole spectrum of underwater systems, business case preparation for equipment procurement and concept studies.

=== Fitting 155mm guns to warships ===
"Since 2006 the MoD has provided some funding to CORDA (BAE Systems’ specialist consultancy arm) and the company's Land Systems business for a 155mm Naval Gun Study". "'Our previous work in this area showed real potential for an enhanced gun system on the Navy's ships,' says Samir Patel, CORDA's business development director. 'This contract will allow more concentrated research and a live, land-based firing trial in 2009 will inform further developments on the programme'. The next step for the programme, subject to a successful trial and MOD requirements, will be a full scale technology demonstrator programme, leading to possible full manufacture and fit to the Future Surface Combatant and possible retrofit to the existing Type 23 Duke-class frigates and/or the Type 45 Daring-class destroyer."

=== Synthetic trials of new 30mm gun on Type 23 frigates ===
In 2008, CORDA was "awarded a £300,000 research contract by the UK MoD's Defence Technology and Innovation Centre (DTIC) to assess the level of protection British warships receive from small calibre 30mm guns." It was to "examine the implications a large attack by small, fast boats would have on a large warship and research how the threat could be reduced. Particular emphasis will be placed on coastal and estuarine environments, where larger ships are increasingly operating... 'Over the last few years the threat of these small craft as an asymmetric weapon against larger warships has grown,' explains Dr John Golightly, CORDA's MSE programme manager. 'What we are doing is looking at the performance of the Royal Navy's 30mm Automated Small Calibre Gun (ASCG) [30mm DS30M] and what can be done to increase the level of protection it provides.'... 'The ASCG system has significantly enhanced capability, but we have been asked to look at how improving tactics or integrating further technology could improve the performance of the system further.'" The DS30M, which the Royal Navy is fitting to Type 23 frigates, "integrates an off-mount electro-optical director (EOD) with a fully automated 30 mm gun mount". The study used "simulator based operator trials and aims to quantify the performance of the entire weapon system when engaging multiple vehicles attacking together in a co-ordinated fashion. Results of the study are expected in early 2009." The trials were at the Maritime Warfare School at HMS Collingwood. CORDA worked in partnership with GE FANUC and BAE Systems' Advanced Technology Centre, in conjunction with the DE&S Integrated Project Teams (IPTs), with Dstl providing technical direction.

== List of conference papers and reports ==
=== ISMOR papers ===
ISMOR is an international conference on defence operational research, held annually since 1984. ISMOR is officially endorsed and sponsored by the UK Ministry of Defence and is co-sponsored by the Defence Special Interest Group of the OR Society, and supported by the Military Operations Research Society in the US. An archive of papers from past Symposia is maintained by Cranfield University.

=== Other conference papers ===
- Frankis, D.; Corrigan, N.; Bailey, R. Modelling military requirements for non-warfighting operations, Simulation Conference Proceedings, Winter 1999. This paper "describes work undertaken for national force development and planning staff, and NATO scientific staff, developing methods and models to assist military planners in identifying the military requirements for non-warfighting operations, typically peace support, humanitarian aid and disaster relief."
