= Telecommunications mediation =

Telecommunications mediation is a process that converts call data to pre-defined layouts that can be imported by a specific billing system or other OSS applications.

== Mediation platform ==
They are often referred to as internet protocol detail records. Mediation also processes event detail records or EDRs that are usually generated by the charging systems or any other network elements. Hence, Mediation platforms can process all xDRs that are generated by any network element, be it CDR, EDR or UDR.

== Naming ==
Billing mediation platforms get their name from their behavior: they "mediate" data between systems. In a typical telephone company scenario, the systems providing data to the mediation platform are network elements, such as telephone switches, and the systems receiving data from the mediation platform perform accounting, auditing, archiving, or bill-generation functions. The mediation system collects, collates and prepares data for consumption by the downstream systems, which often accept data only in a limited set of formats.

== Data types ==
The usage and call detail record datatypes hold data such as NPA (numbering plan area), NPX (local exchange), call duration, peak time flag and call length. Data may be represented in ASCII or binary formats. The billing mediation platform typically reads this data and converts it into common normalized format.

Billing systems and all other downstream systems, in turn, converts this data to component [its own] understandable format.

== Functionality ==
Typically a mediation platform is used for the following tasks:

- Collection and validation of call detail records
- Filtering out of non billing-relevant call detail records
- Collating
- Correlation of different input sources call detail records
- Aggregation of partial call detail records related to the same call
- Format change and call detail record normalization
- Business transformation of data

In a telecom billing scenario, mediation is the first step after receiving a call detail record. The mediated call detail record files are forwarded to a rating engine, which calculates the charge associated with the call detail records. In today's world, Rating Engines are becoming more necessary for the telecom billing system to be able to meet the growing variant customer needs for different services.

Despite the name, not all of the data transferred via billing mediation platforms is actually used for billing purposes. For instance, the mediation software might generate traffic volume statistics based on the number and origin of the records it processes. Those statistics could then be used for capacity planning, as part of a network monitoring procedure, or for any other business intelligence applications.

At core, mediation involves data transfer between various systems with or without modification of data starting from Network elements to any OSS/BSS systems.

Sophisticated billing mediation software serves end to end functionality for telecom operators. Mediation software performs various operations from data collection to downstream distribution to modules like retail billing, roaming, interconnect settlement, business intelligence, fraud detection and revenue assurance.

Following list provides insight on mediation software activities

- Collection and archiving
- Decoding/Encoding
- Normalization (common format)
- Filtering
- Conversion
- Validation
- Record enrichment (using complex reference data)
- Duplicate record detection
- Aggregation or Correlation
- Buffering
- Cloning
- Sorting
- Downstream format mapping
- Header and trailer generation
- Downstream distribution
- Error messaging and alarms
- Auditing and reports
- Reconciliation
- Reference data configuration
- Provisioning services for the subscription

Complementary to billing mediation functions, comprehensive mediation platforms also provide functionality dedicated to Service Provisioning (the two areas frequently intermix as services configured and used by the end customer result in usage data records generation in the network).

Mediating between the systems is not the only job that Mediation Platform can do. Actually this can be used as a provisioning agent. The basic provisioning commands can be configured within the mediation system and whenever we get a request for the system which does the provisioning, the request can be converted into a file, in which mediation can append the service provisioning commands and send it to the Home Location Register (HLR) for activating any request. This of course, load dependent but can come very handy when there is a crisis in the other system.

== Supported systems ==
Telecom operators offer Voice, video, data, fax and internet services to subscribers and partners on various product lines. Mediation products are tuned to provide solutions for complex business challenges. The call data is produced by network devices in the form of call detail record).

Mediation platforms for telecom practice support various systems:

- Retail Billing
- Wholesale Billing - National and International
- Network Traffic Management Tools
- Data Warehousing Systems
- Business Intelligence / Big Data Systems
- Reconciliation Systems
- Fraud Management Systems
- Provisioning feed to sub-systems
- RA - Revenue Assurance Systems
- ICT - Information and Communication Technology Systems
- Assurance Insight Synap System
