= Ansaldo MIAS =

The Ansaldo MIAS (Motomitragliatrice blindata d’assaulto), along with the MORAS (Moto-mortaio blindato d’assaulto) were tracked, mobile shield prototypes developed by Italy by Gio. Ansaldo & C. in 1935.

While sometimes described as a "tankette", the MIAS/MORAS was a self-propelled, armed, mobile shield for a lone infantryman. The idea was that a single soldier could walk, then later crouch behind the motorized shield, making it a kind of mobile pillbox. Two prototypes were created, both powered by a 250cc, 5 hp Frera gas engine that allowed for speeds of up to 5 km/h forward or 2.2 km/h reverse. The MIAS and MORAS differed only in armament, with the MIAS being equipped with twin Scotti 6.5 machine guns while the MORAS was equipped with a 45 mm Brixia Model 35 mortar. The machine guns could be elevated to 14 degrees, depressed to 10 degrees, and could be moved 20 degrees horizontally.

The MIAS carried 1,000 rounds of ammunition, along with tools such as a spade and bill-hook for clearing obstacles. The MORAS' mortar could be elevated to 72 degrees, depressed to -10 degrees, and it carried 50 .5 kg grenades. Frontal armor was capable of deflecting steel-core 7.92×57mm Mauser at 90 degree angle from 50 meters, and the thinner side armor protected against 6.5×52mm Carcano ball ammunition from 50 meters at a 90 degree angle. The top plate hinged upward to protect the gunner. Development never continued past the prototype stage and both the MIAS and MORAS projects were abandoned.
