= Princess Claire of Luxembourg =

Member of the Grand Ducal Family of Luxembourg

- Born: Claire Margareta Lademacher; 21 March 1985 (age 40); Filderstadt, Baden-Württemberg, West Germany
- Spouse: Prince Félix of Luxembourg (m. 2013)
- Issue: Princess Amalia of Nassau; Prince Liam of Nassau; Prince Balthazar of Nassau
- Father: Hartmut Lademacher
- Mother: Gabriele Schneider
- Occupation: Bioethics researcher

Princess Claire of Luxembourg (born Claire Margareta Lademacher, 21 March 1985) is a member of the grand ducal family of Luxembourg. She is the wife of Prince Félix, who is fourth in the line of succession to the throne of Luxembourg. Claire is also a bioethics researcher.

== Early life and academic career ==
Claire was born on 21 March 1985 in Filderstadt, West Germany (in present-day Germany). She is the second child of Gabriele Lademacher (née Schneider) and Hartmut Lademacher. Her father, founder of LHS Telekommunikation and owner of castles in Croatia and Saint-Tropez, began his career at IBM and amassed an estimated €600 million by investing in the software industry. Claire and her older brother, Felix, spent their childhood in Usingen. At the age of 11, Lademacher moved with her family to Atlanta, and was enrolled in Atlanta International School. The family returned to Germany in 1999 and from then on, Lademacher attended Frankfurt International School, before enrolling in Collège Alpin International Beau Soleil in Switzerland. She obtained the English A-Levels diploma with honours (Prize of Excellency). In 2003, she began studying international communication at the American University of Paris and graduated in 2007.

Having obtained her undergraduate degree, Lademacher worked in publishing for Condé Nast Publications in New York City and Munich. She also worked as a project manager for IMG World in Berlin. While an employee of Condé Nast Publications, she made the decision to pursue a career in academic bioethics. She proceeded to obtain a master's degree in bioethics at the Pontifical Athenaeum Regina Apostolorum, receiving it with the distinction summa cum laude. At the same time, she was working for the UNESCO Chair of Bioethics and Human Rights, concerning herself primarily with research, event coordination and communications. In 2012, Lademacher was in Rome, preparing a doctorate in the field of organ donation ethics at Regina Apostolorum. The subject of her dissertation is the bioethical evaluation of consent for organ donation. The dissertation focuses on the situations in Germany, Austria, and the United States. For several months in the fall of 2012, she was a visiting scholar at the Kennedy Institute of Ethics at Georgetown University. In February 2018, Princess Claire became a visiting professor at the Faculty of Bioethics at the Ateneo Pontificio Regina Apostolorum University in Rome.

In addition to her native German, Lademacher speaks English, French, and Italian.

== Personal life ==
Lademacher met Prince Félix of Luxembourg while studying at Collège Alpin International Beau Soleil. The couple attended the wedding of Prince Félix's cousin, Archduke Imre of Austria, in Washington, D.C., in September 2012. In October, they attended the wedding of his older brother Hereditary Grand Duke Guillaume and Countess Stéphanie de Lannoy, but were not allowed to sit together at the ceremony.

On 13 December, the grand ducal household confirmed that Lademacher was engaged to marry Prince Félix. Lademacher was presented to the press at the Château de Berg on 27 December. The civil wedding took place on 17 September 2013 in Königstein im Taunus, Germany, it being customary that weddings take place in the bride's place of residence. A religious ceremony followed on 21 September at the Sainte Marie-Madeleine Basilica in Saint-Maximin-la-Sainte-Baume, France.

Upon her marriage, Claire became a princess of Luxembourg with the style of Royal Highness. (Note: as stipulated by the 18 June 2012 House Law revisions by Prince Félix's father, Grand Duke Henri.) Since their wedding, they live in the south of France at the Château Les Crostes, a winery in Lorgues that has been owned by the Lademacher family for many years. She is co-founder of the Young Empire company, a children’s clothing and decorating brand. The couple have three children:

- Princess Amalia Gabriela Maria Teresa of Nassau (born on 15 June 2014 at the Grand Duchess Charlotte Maternity Hospital in Luxembourg City, Luxembourg).
- Prince Liam Henri Hartmut of Nassau (born on 28 November 2016 at the Clinique Générale-Beaulieu in Geneva, Switzerland).
- Prince Balthazar Félix Karl of Nassau (born on 7 January 2024 at the Grand Duchess Charlotte Maternity Hospital in Luxembourg City, Luxembourg).

== Activities ==
Princess Claire has an interest in social and cultural themes. She has made many trips while being involved in humanitarian projects, such as visiting Tiruppur, India. In March 2018, she attended the Ethics in Action ('Modern Slavery, Human Trafficking, and Access to Justice for the Poor and Vulnerable’) conference at the Pontificia Academia Scientiarum of the Vatican.

Princess Claire is the patron of Luxembourg Transplant ASBL association. She regularly attends the World Organ Donation Day in Luxembourg. In addition, she supports the Le Sourire de Lucie Foundation. In March 2019, Claire became a speaker in the panel discussion on the inclusion of children born of rape at the Stand Speak Rise Up! initiative. Princess Claire and her husband participate in the 72nd Bazaar of the Luxembourg Red Cross.

== Titles, honours and awards ==
Her title since her marriage on 17 September 2013 is: "Her Royal Highness Princess Claire of Luxembourg".

- Luxembourg:
  - Grand Cross of Order of Adolphe of Nassau
