= Hartmut Lademacher =

German entrepreneur (born 1948)

- Born: July 5, 1948 (age 78)
- Known for: Founder of LHS Telekommunikation
- Spouse: Gabriele Schneider
- Children: Felix Lademacher; Princess Claire of Luxembourg

Hartmut Lademacher (born 5 July 1948) is a German tech entrepreneur.

== Biography ==
In 1990, Lademacher founded, together with Joachim Hertel, Rainer Zimmermann and other executives at IBM where he had been working, the company LHS Specifications GmbH (LHS Telekommunikation) in Dietzenbach. LHS is an acronym for "Lademacher and Hertel Software". In 1997 the company went as the third company ever in the new market. In 2000, the company was sold for 4.7 billion euros to Sema. Lademacher was initially non-executive director at Sema but had to end of November 2000 to resign from that office, when it was revealed that before the release of quarterly figures he had sold Sema shares worth about 100 million DM. In 2004, Lademacher bought back LHS for apparently EUR 50 million to sell it in 2006 to Ericsson.

Lademacher became known to a wider audience when its asset management SMM Germany GmbH bought Villa Andreae from the real estate entrepreneur Jürgen Schneider. His fortune is estimated at EUR 600 million.

== Marriage and family ==
Lademacher is married to Gabriele Lademacher (née Schneider) and has two children.

His daughter Claire Margareta Lademacher is married to Prince Félix of Luxembourg, the second son of Grand Duke Henri of Luxembourg.
