= LHS Telekommunikation =

Former LHS Telekommunikation GmbH & Co. KG
- Type: Subsidiary (formerly)
- Industry: Telecommunications
- Founded: 1990
- Defunct: 2011
- Fate: Fully integrated into Ericsson
- Successor: Ericsson
- Headquarters: Frankfurt am Main, Germany (formerly)
- Area served: Worldwide
- Products: BSCS, BSCS iX, iX Series, iX Collections
- Services: Billing, Rating, Customer Care, Mediation, Network Element Provisioning, Collections, Revenue Management
- Parent: Ericsson

Former LHS Telekommunikation GmbH & Co. KG, is now a fully integrated part of Ericsson. From 28 January 2011, the Ericsson brand is used for all billing and customer care solutions of the company.

== History ==
LHS, originally founded as LHS Specifications GmbH in 1990 in Dietzenbach, Germany, was established by a team of former IBM group engineers and managers, including Hartmut Lademacher, Dr. Joachim Hertel, and Dr. Rainer Zimmermann. The company name, LHS, stands for Lademacher und Hertel Software. Hartmut Lademacher served as the founding CEO and was instrumental in shaping the company’s early direction and international expansion.

The company entered the market with a self-developed billing and customer care system known as BSCS (Business Support and Control System), designed to serve the rapidly growing mobile telecommunications sector. With the global boom in mobile communications during the 1990s, LHS experienced rapid growth alongside its expanding customer base and industry.

In 1995, all global activities of the company were consolidated under LHS Group Inc., headquartered in Atlanta, Georgia, USA, marking the start of its emergence as an international player. This move facilitated greater access to international markets and investment.

In 1997, LHS Group Inc. went public with an initial public offering (IPO) on the Nasdaq stock exchange, raising $77 million. Later, the company was also listed on Germany’s Neuer Markt, further increasing its financial visibility and international investor interest.

In 2000, LHS Group Inc. was acquired by Sema for $4.7 billion, signifying the value of its telecom software capabilities. However, in 2001, Sema itself was acquired by Schlumberger for $5.2 billion, and the combined entity was renamed SchlumbergerSema.

By 2003, Schlumberger decided to refocus on its core oilfield services and equipment business. As a result, SchlumbergerSema’s telecom division was split into two components: a product house focused on software solutions, which retained LHS's product lines, and a systems integration business, which was sold to Atos Origin for $1.5 billion.

In 2004, the LHS product house was acquired by LHS Beteiligungs AG, an investment company owned by Hartmut Lademacher, and General Atlantic, LLC, an investment firm that included original LHS Group shareholders. The acquisition marked a return to independent operations and reaffirmed the leadership's commitment to the telecom software space.

LHS was then converted into a stock corporation in August 2006 and went public again in October 2006 on the German Prime Standard under the ticker LHS400.

In June 2007, Ericsson, the Swedish telecom giant, acquired 75.1% of LHS’s shares for $420 million and launched a public offer for the remaining shares. During the period between 2007 and 2010, LHS remained mostly separated organization but part of Ericsson Group.

By February 2010, Ericsson completed the acquisition of all outstanding shares, delisting LHS from the German Stock Exchange, and making it a wholly owned subsidiary. Since then, LHS has been fully integrated into Ericsson’s global operations, continuing to contribute to its billing and customer care technology portfolio, BSCS continues to exist as a product renamed as Ericsson Billing.

== Products and awards ==
The company's principal product was the Business Support and Control System (BSCS), a billing and customer care platform used by telecommunications operators. The system was adopted by multiple operators during the 1990s and 2000s.

LHS received several industry awards in the 2000s, including recognition from the GSM Association (GSMA).

== International locations and offices ==
- Germany
  - LH Specifications GmbH
    - Theodor-Heuss-Ring 52, 63128 Dietzenbach
  - LH Specifications GmbH
  - LHS Group
  - Sema-lhs Verwaltungs GmbH
  - SchlumbergerSema Management GmbH
  - Atos Origin
  - LHS Aktiengesellschaft
    - 36 Otto-Hahn Straße, 63303 Dreieich
  - LHS Telekommunikation GmbH & Co. KG
  - Ericsson
    - Herriotstraße 1, 60528 Frankfurt am Main
- Brazil
  - LHS do Brasil
    - Marketplace Towers, São Paulo
    - CENU Towers, São Paulo
  - SchlumbergerSema
    - Birmann 12, Av. Alexandre Dumas, São Paulo
  - Atos Origin
    - CPD Phillips, Rua Itapaiuna, São Paulo
  - LHS Americas
    - Dumas Tower, Av. Alexandre Dumas, São Paulo
  - LHS, Part of Ericsson Group
    - Corporate Plaza, Av. Alexandre Dumas, São Paulo
  - Ericsson
    - Centro Ericsson, Vila Guilherme, São Paulo
    - Corporate Time, Jardim das Perdizes, São Paulo
    - Marketplace Towers, São Paulo
    - CENU Towers, São Paulo
- USA
  - LHS Group, Inc.
    - 6 Concourse Pkwy, Ste 2700, Atlanta, Georgia 30328
- Kuala Lumpur
- Madrid, Spain
