= BAeSEMA =

Naval technology joint venture

BAESEMA was a naval technology joint venture between British Aerospace and the French Sema Group. The company was formed in 1991 and dissolved in November 1998 when BAe purchased SEMA's 50% share.

BAESEMA acquired Dowty-Sema in 1992, another naval system joint venture between Dowty Group and Sema.

== Capabilities ==
- Naval combat management systems
  - Type 23 frigate – command and control system
  - Vanguard-class ballistic missile submarine – command and control system
- Warship prime contracting
  - HMS Scott ocean survey vessel – (building subcontracted to Appledore Shipbuilders)
- Communications
- IT

== History ==
From BAe's perspective BAESEMA was an attempt to increase its capabilities as a naval prime contractor. This was not entirely successful for two reasons:

- A customer was more likely to choose a prime contractor with shipbuilding experience and capabilities.
- Another shipbuilder was unwilling to team with the company because as prime contractor BAESEMA would effectively control that shipbuilder.

BAESEMA's major competitor in the UK naval systems market was GEC-Marconi through its Ferranti Naval Systems and Plessey Naval Systems businesses.

On November 11, 1998, BAe acquired Sema's interest in the company for £77 million and merged it into British Aerospace Defence Ltd. BAe's naval capabilities increased dramatically in the next year, its acquisition of Marconi Electronic Systems to form BAE Systems saw it take control of Marconi Marine's shipyards; VSEL (Barrow-in-Furness), Govan (Glasgow) and YSL (Scotstoun).
