= Sema Group =

Defunct Anglo-French IT services company (1988-2001)

- Type: Public
- Industry: Information Technology
- Founded: 1988
- Defunct: 2001
- Fate: Acquired
- Successor: Schlumberger
- Headquarters: Paris, France

Sema Group plc was an Anglo-French IT services company. It was listed on the London Stock Exchange and was a constituent of the FTSE 100 Index. It was acquired by Schlumberger in 2001.

== History ==
The company was founded in 1988 by the merger of the British CAP Group and the French company, Sema-Metra SA. In 1991 Sema and British Aerospace established the BAeSEMA naval systems joint venture to produce naval systems: it was dissolved in November 1998 when BAe purchased Sema's 50% share for £77 million.

By December 1991 Sema had acquired the Cambridge-based consultancy Baddeley Associates, from which it created Sema Group Consulting.

In 1997, Sema acquired British Rail Business Systems for £27m which was sold off by the UK Government as part of the Privatisation of British Rail. In the same time frame, Sema also acquired Syntax in Italy, formerly the IT Services division of Olivetti, adding another important market to its geography.

In 2000, Sema acquired LHS for €5.1 billion to access its US telecoms software and services businesses: some analysts blamed the LHS acquisition for a profits warning in 2000 and a 45% fall in its stock market valuation.

In 2001, Sema Group plc was acquired by Schlumberger and was renamed SchlumbergerSema. In 2004 the bulk of the company was sold on to Atos Origin. The messaging unit was merged with Taral Networks and spun off as Airwide Solutions. The Smart Card and Terminal Department (formerly part of Schlumberger Test & Transactions) became Axalto, which later merged with Gemplus International to form Gemalto.

== Operations ==
Sema was registered in the United Kingdom but headquartered in Paris. Sema originally stood for Société d'Économétrie et de Mathématiques Appliquées.
