= Magarpatta =

Residential township in Pune, India

- Gated community
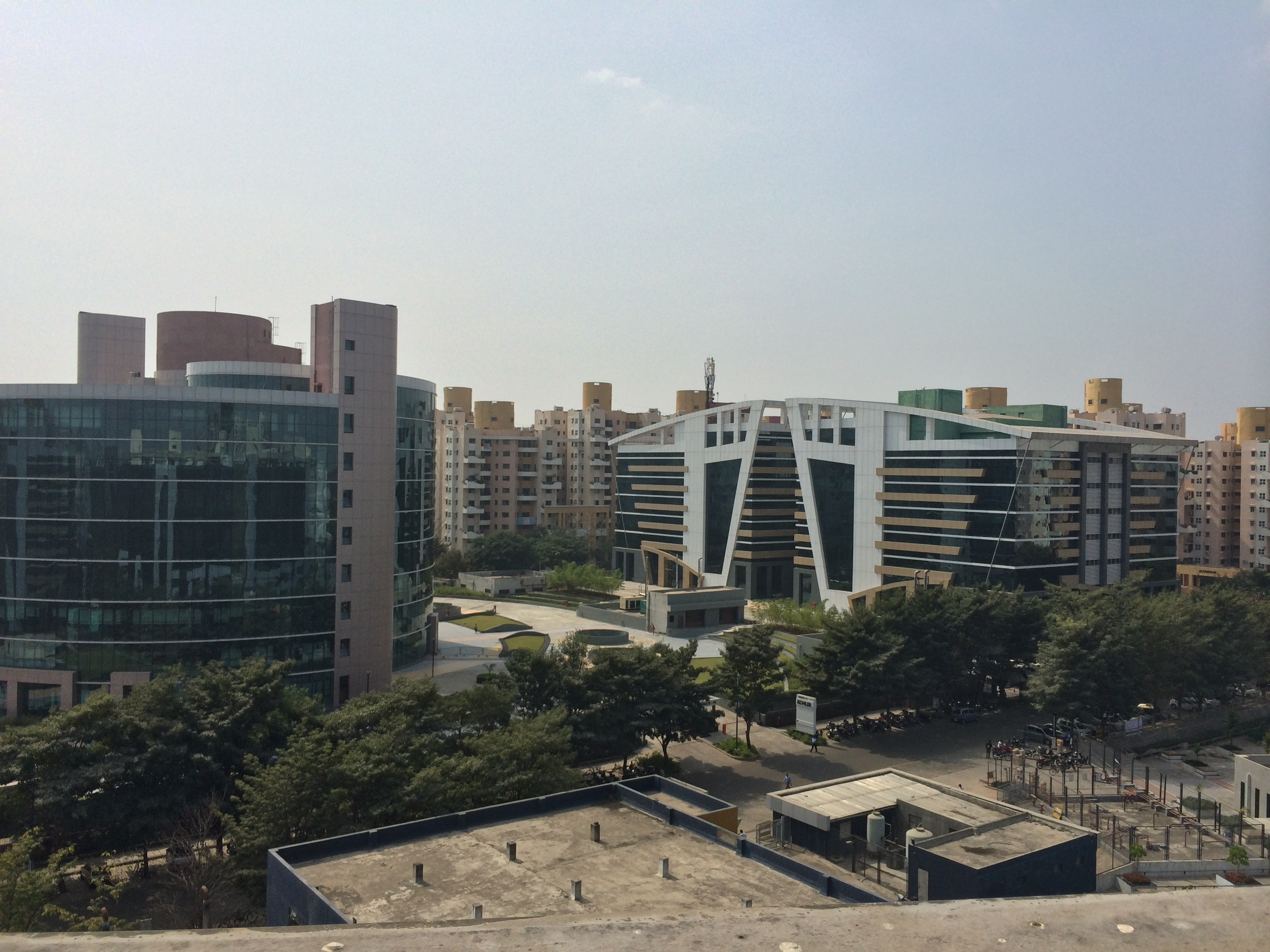
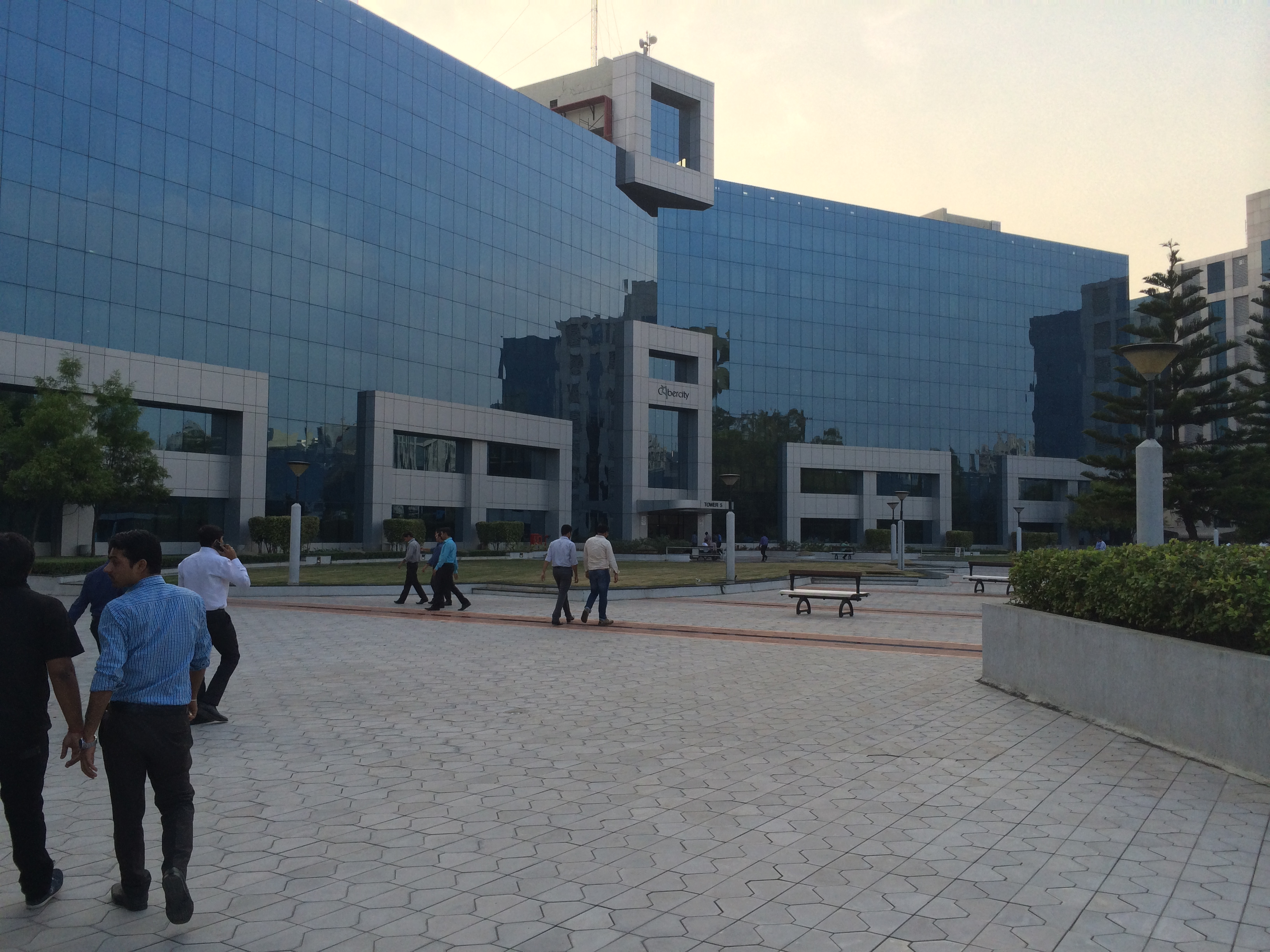
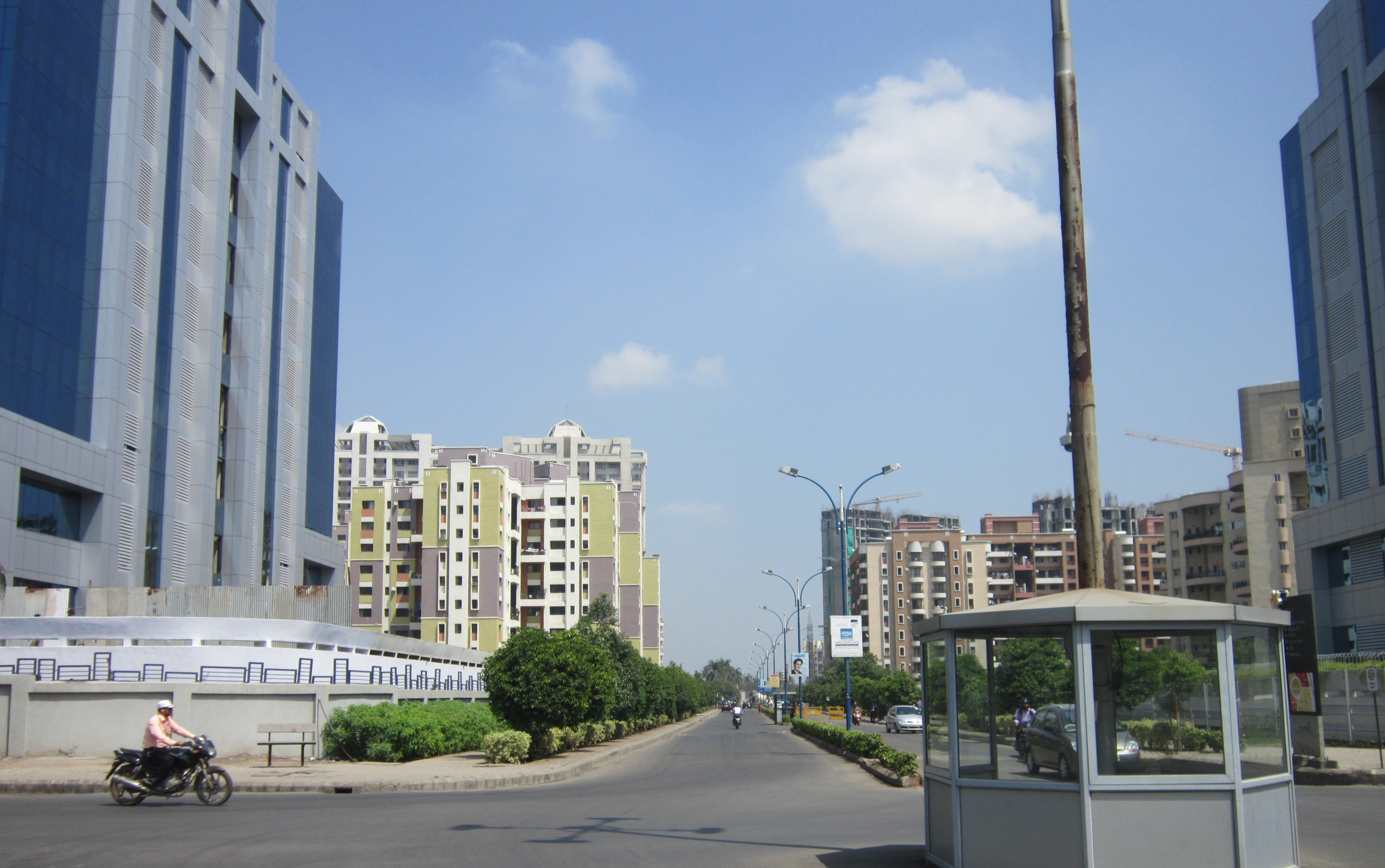
- Magarpatta CyberCity
- Interactive map of Magarpatta
- Coordinates: 18.515729°N 73.927195°E
- Country: India
- State: Maharashtra
- City: Pune
- Website: magarpattacity

Magarpatta (Marathi: मगरपट्टा lit. Land of The Magar family) is a 182-hectare, gated community in the Hadapsar, Pune, India. It has a commercial area, residential area, hospital with several specializations, a 10-hectare urban park named "Aditi Gardens", a shopping mall named "Seasons Mall", a shopping complex named "Destination Centre" and schools. Around 30% of the area is made up of green cover. Construction began in 2000 and continues as of 2025.

== Management ==
The Magarpatta Township Development & Construction Company Limited is the governing body. Satish Magar is the chairman & managing director of the township.

== Commercial establishments ==
CyberCity

Tower	Companies
1	Avaya, Sybase, WNS Global Services, EXL Service, KET Infotech Pvt. Ltd, Yash Technologies
2	Amdocs
3	Amdocs, John Deere, Varian Medical Systems, Owens & Minors
4	Mphasis, Varian Medical Systems, Globant
5	Accenture, SAS, Deutsche Bank, Reflexis Systems India Pvt Ltd, Cerillion
6	Ocwen, Principal, New Balance
7	Dresser-Rand Group, Hitachi Consulting, HCL Technologies, MarketsandMarkets, Compucom, UPS solutions
8	WNS Global Services, Capgemini, Springer Nature, Xento Systems, Systems Plus
9	Teradata, Tata Elxsi, Springer Nature, Sutherland, Xento Systems, EXL Service
10	Red Hat, Capita, Preferred Engineering Pvt Ltd
11	John Deere, Dar Al-Handasah, Avaya, Varian Medical Systems
12	Amdocs, Appdirect India, Teradata, Sybase, EXL Service, Bentley Systems, Dar Al-Handasah, Infosys

Pentagon

Tower	Companies
3	Arnekt Solutions Pvt. Ltd.
3	Datafortune Software Solutions Pvt. Ltd.

== Residential clusters ==
Magarpatta City has the below residential clusters. Names of these clusters are based on different flower species, and they are listed below in order from oldest to newest.

Apartment clusters

S. No.	Residential Apartment Cluster
1	Daffodils - 2 and 3 BHK society with 8 buildings, 4 with 6 floors and 4 with 11 floors.
2	Grevillea - 2 and 3 BHK society with 14 buildings, 8 with 6 floors, 4 with 7 floors, and 2 with 11 floors.
3	Heliconia - 1 BHK society with 24 buildings, 6 with 5 floors and 18 with 6 floors.
4	Cosmos - 2 and 3 BHK society with 24 buildings, 13 with 7 floors, 10 with 9 floors, and 1 with 11 floors.
5	Iris - 2 BHK society with 20 buildings, 12 with 9 floors and 8 with 11 floors.
6	Jasminium - 2 and 3 BHK society with 31 buildings, 17 with 9 floors and 14 with 11 floors.
7	Roystonea - 2 and 3 BHK society with 14 buildings, 8 with 9 floors and 6 with 11 floors.
8	Laburnum Park - 3 and 4 BHK society with 16 buildings of 11 floors each.
9	Sylvania - 2 and 3 BHK society with 8 buildings, 4 with 9 floors and 4 with 11 floors.
10	Trillium - 2 and 3 BHK society with 14 buildings, 7 with 9 floors and 7 with 11 floors.
11	Zinnia - 1 BHK society with 13 buildings of 5 floors each.
12	Annexe - 1 and 2 BHK society with 7 buildings of 11 floors each.

Villa clusters

S. No.	Residential Villa Cluster
1	Erica Row Houses
2	Acacia Gardens Bungalows
3	Mulberry Gardens Bungalows
4	Zinnia Row Houses

== Schools ==
- Magarpatta City Public School. - ICSE board

== Aditi Garden ==
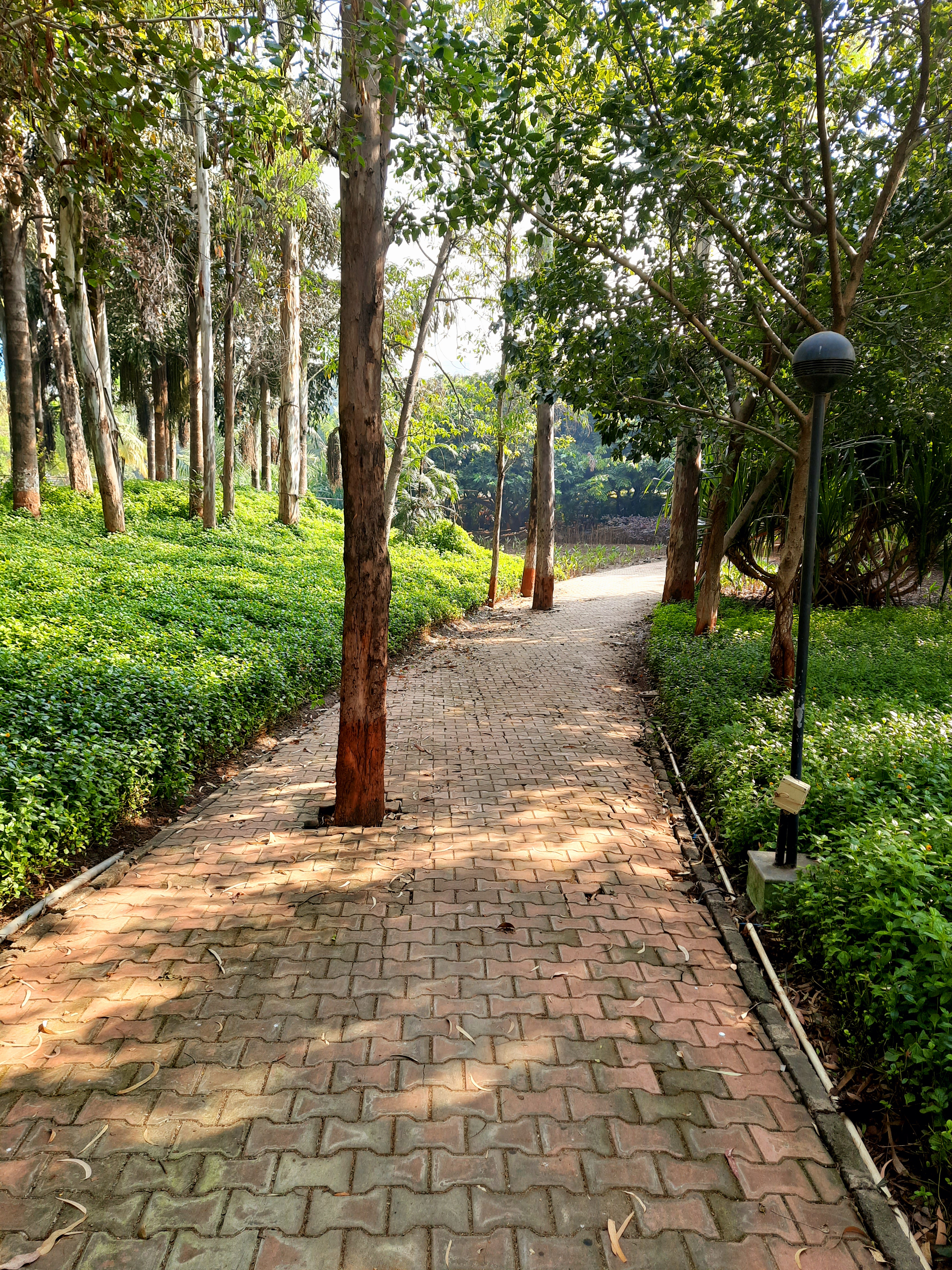
Aditi Garden, Magarpatta

A 25 acres urban park.

== Awards ==
- Magarpatta won accolades at the Sydney World Congress of Metropolis in 2008. The Maharashtra Economic Development Council lists it among the Top 10 Success Stories of the State.
- Magarpatta won the Best Residential Property in India at the CNBC Awaaz-Crisil-Credai Real Estate Awards, 2009.

== In popular culture ==
=== Film ===
- The college inauguration scene of the film Sivaji: The Boss (a 2007 Indian Tamil masala film) was shot at the Magarpatta City SEZ towers.
- Mirchi (a 2013 Telugu action drama) was also shot in Magarpatta City.
- Andhadhun (a 2018 Hindi dark comedy thriller) was also shot in Magarpatta City.

Many car and bike commercial advertisements have been shot in Magarpatta City. It has also been a host to a lot of movie stars.

== See also ==
- Hinjawadi
- Nanded City
- Hadapsar
