= One bill =

One bill may refer to:

- Convergent charging, where a single bill is used for multiple telecommunications services from a single company, as is frequently done with triple play or quadruple play bundles
- United States one-dollar bill
