= Andrew Karney =

British electrical engineer (born 1942)

Andrew Karney FIET CEng FRSA
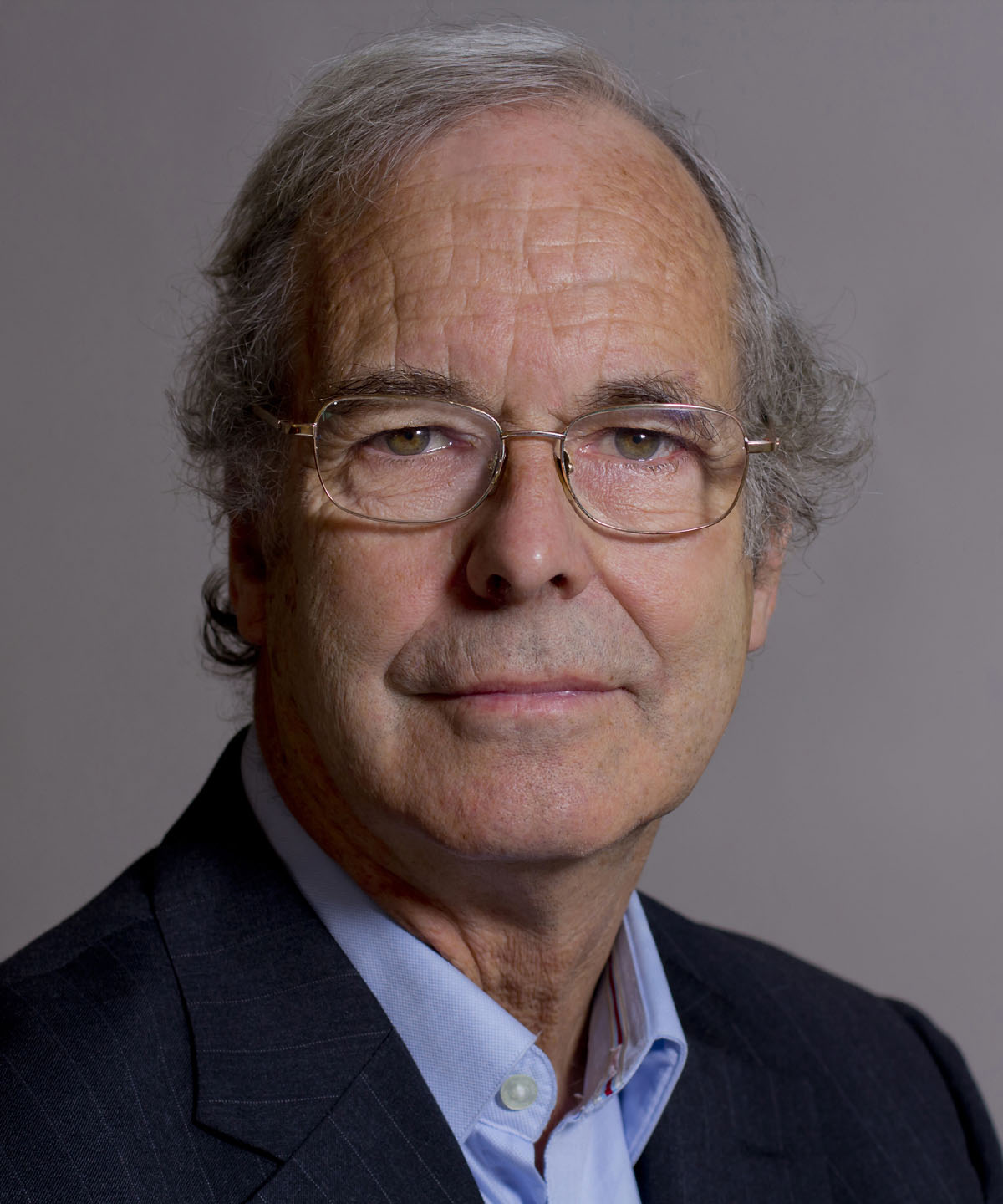
- Born: Andrew Lumsdaine Karney; 24 May 1942 (age 84); Dovercourt, Essex, England
- Education: Rugby School; Trinity College, Cambridge
- Occupations: Chartered engineer, businessman
- Notable work: Director of Guardian Media Group and Logica; Senior scientist at General Electric Company
- Spouse: Beryl Goldwyn (m. 1969; died 2022)
- Children: 1
- Website: http://www.karney.com

Andrew Karney, FIET, CEng, FRSA (born 24 May 1942) is a British electrical engineer, businessman and company director. He is also an accredited European Engineer.

== Career ==
Karney studied engineering at Trinity College, Cambridge. He started his career working as a teacher for the United Nations Relief and Works Agency (UNRWA) in Lebanon and Gaza in 1964 and 1965, when it was occupied by Egypt. He was honoured by the United Nations Secretary-General, U Thant in 1969.

Karney worked as a development engineer at Standard Telephones and Cables on a small team headed by British engineer Tommy Flowers, who designed Colossus, the world's first programmable electronic computer, used to break German wartime codes, particularly the Lorenz cipher. He played an important role in the development of the world's first fully electronic digital telephone exchange, which was developed in collaboration with Laboratoire Central de Télécommunications, based in Paris, and which was then installed in Moorgate in the City of London in 1967. He also worked as a senior scientist at Hirst Research Centre, the central research laboratories of the UK General Electric Company on the development codecs for high speed (140 Mbit/s) digital transmission systems which were used to test the capabilities of helix wave guides (and later of optical fibres), digital radio receivers for GCHQ and electronic telephone exchanges. During this time he filed a number of international patents which were used by developers of the first digital telephone switching equipment in the UK, the US, Canada, France, Sweden and Japan.

In 1973, he joined Logica, an international systems company and was a senior member of team of engineers from Supreme Headquarters Allied Powers Europe, SHAPE Technical Center in the Hague, military personnel from NATO countries and industry defining the communications and IT requirements for the underground Static War HQ to be built near Mons in Belgium. He was project director of the European project based in Paris to bring the Internet to Europe from 1975 to 1976. INRIA in France, Euratom in Italy, the National Physical Laboratory (United Kingdom), ETH Zurich (Eidgenössische Technische Hochschule Zürich), Polytechnic University of Milan and the Organisation Européenne pour la Recherche Nucléaire, commonly known as CERN, participated in the project, where the World Wide Web was conceived by Tim Berners-Lee in 1989. The project with implemented under the guidance of two of the original pioneers of the Packet Switching, Louis Pouzin from France and Donald Davies from the UK. In 1984, Karney became a main board director responsible for the telecommunications, electronics, space, government and media sectors as well as operations in Italy and Asia, which included the development of the trading system for the new unified Hong Kong Stock Exchange, and the first container management system for Hongkong International Terminals. During that time he was responsible for the development of the Customer Service System for British Telecommunications (BT/CSS), the £1bn total implementation, represented largest computer project undertaken in Europe and the largest integrated database in the world and the development of early Text Messaging (SMS) for mobile phones.

In 1984, together with others, he founded Cable London plc – one of the first cable TV operations in the UK, which subsequently became part of Telewest now part of Virgin Media. From 1980 to 1990 he was a member of the UK National Electronics Council, an independent nongovernmental organisation, originally set up in July, 1964, under the chairmanship of Earl Mountbatten of Burma seeking to coordinate pure and applied research in electronics, and later chaired by Prince Edward, Duke of Kent.

On leaving Logica in 1994, Karney became a director of NASDAQ quoted Integrated Micro Products, later acquired by Sun Microsystems (now part of Oracle Corporation) and chairman of Language Line Ltd, a telephone interpreting and language resources company founded by Lord Michael Young (politician), now owned by Teleperformance in France. In 1997, he became an independent director of the Guardian Media Group plc and Guardian News and Media, publishers of The Guardian and The Observer newspapers, chairing the IT steering board - responsible for the development of all the news and commercial platforms for the newspapers and websites. He was a director of Baronsmead Second Venture Trust from 2001 to 2016, a venture capital company, investing in a number of technology and business services companies. In 2005 he was appointed chairman of the trustees of the international NGO, Integrity Action, which seeks practical solutions to reducing corruption in governments, civil society and business. From 2009 to 2018, he was a trustee of Medical Aid for Palestinians which supports the health and dignity of Palestinians living under occupation and as refugees. He then became a trustee of the Welfare Association (UK), which supports Palestinian families and communities in the West Bank and the Gaza Strip and in the refugee camps in Lebanon. From January 2020, he was a director of Helix Technologies, a specialist developer of compact, high-performance, dielectric-loaded ceramic antennas for demanding telecommunications and navigation applications until the completion of a significant Venture Capital funding round in November 2021.

He is a chartered engineer, fellow of the Institution of Engineering and Technology, a Freeman of the City of London, a fellow of the Royal Society for the encouragement of Arts, Manufactures & Commerce. He is a member of Chatham House (The Royal Institute of International Affairs), The Council for Arab-British Understanding and an expert on contemporary Middle Eastern affairs, particularly Palestine and Syria.

In 2020 he wrote one of the essays in the book "I Found Myself in Palestine: Stories from around the Globe" which is a collection of personal reflections on the experience of being a foreigner in Palestine edited by Nora Murad Lester, in which he describes his experiences in Gaza in 1964. He is one of the founding donors at The Palestinian Museum in Birzeit and many of his photographs taken in Gaza in the 1960s are archived there.

== Personal life ==
Karney is one of six children. His father was Gilbert Henry Peter Karney, vicar of Embleton, Northumberland, and his grandfather was Bishop Arthur Karney, the first bishop of Johannesburg. His mother was Celia Karney (née Richardson), granddaughter of John Wigham Richardson. Richardson was a Quaker Victorian shipbuilder and founder of Swan Hunter and Wigham Richardson shipbuilders on Tyneside, who built the RMS Mauretania (1906). Celia Karney was also great niece of Charles Hesterman Merz, a pioneer of electrical distribution in the UK referred to as the “Grid King”, who was President of the Institution of Electrical Engineers and was awarded the Faraday medal. Andrew Karney was a talented amateur photographer in the 1960s specialising in ballet photography published in various dance magazines and national newspapers. He also took some of the iconic photographs of the 1968 demonstrations in Paris against the Gaullist government. It was his photography that led him into contact with the prima ballerina Beryl Goldwyn whom he married in 1969 and with whom he had a son.
