= Logica =

Defunct multinational IT and management consultancy company

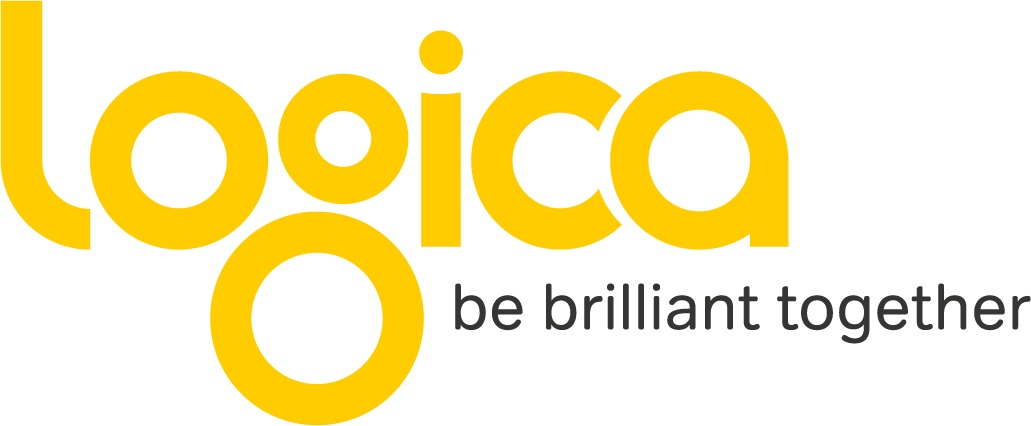
- Type: Private (1969–83); Public (1983–2012); Subsidiary (2012–13)
- Industry: IT services, IT consulting
- Founded: 1969
- Fate: Acquired by CGI Inc in 2012
- Headquarters: Reading, United Kingdom
- Key people: Pat Coen (founder); Len Taylor (founder); Philip Hughes (founder); David Mann (CEO, 1987–93); Martin Read (CEO 1993–2007); Andy Green (CEO, 2007–); Serge Godin (Executive Chairman); George D Schindler (President and CEO)
- Services: IT, business consulting and outsourcing services
- Revenue: £3,921 million (2011)
- Operating income: £54.5 million (2011)
- Net income: £27.2 million (2011)
- Number of employees: 21,000 (2012)
- Parent: CGI Inc
- Website: www.cgi.com

Logica plc was a multinational IT and management consultancy company headquartered in London and later Reading, United Kingdom.

Founded in 1969, the company had offices in London and in a number of major cities across England, Wales and Scotland, as well as in other countries around the world. It was responsible for many telecommunications infrastructure projects, such as the design of the SWIFT network for international money transfers, the Euronet packet-switching network, and the Bay Area Rapid Transit in San Francisco. Following the acquisition of CMG in 2002, the company was known as LogicaCMG from then until 2008, when it changed its name back to Logica. The company's main business at that point was providing consulting, systems integration, and IT outsourcing in both the public and private sectors.

Logica was acquired by Canada-based CGI Inc in 2012 and the Logica brand name ceased being used in 2013.

== History ==
=== Origins ===
Logica was started as a systems integration business in 1969. Its founders were five people who left Scicon, an American computer company that had opened a London-based UK subsidiary and that had then been bought by BP. Chief among these were Len Taylor, who took the operational helm, and Philip Hughes, who served in the visionary role. The other founders were Pat Coen, Steve Feldman, and John McNeil. Another important figure, David Mann, joined the fledgling outfit a few weeks later.

=== Early projects and expansion ===
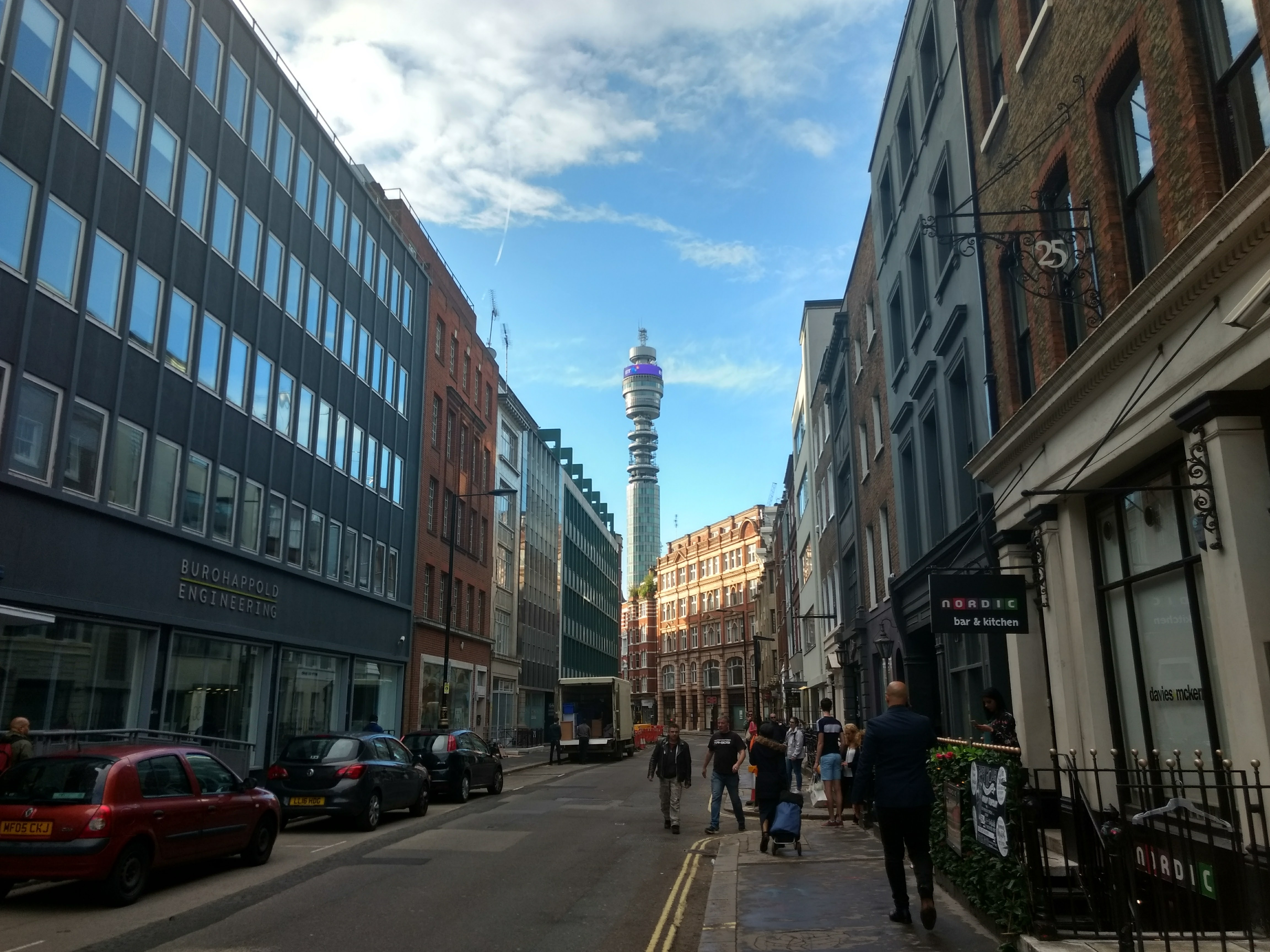
Logica's headquarters were at 64, Newman Street, fourth building on the left, in the Fitzrovia section of central London (here seen in 2017)

The new firm's first major contract came in 1970 for a computerized hotel reservation system that would operate on a nationwide basis and was worth £100,000. Another early project was the control system for the United Kingdom's natural gas grid in 1971. In its early years the company focused on adapting software to specific customer needs and requirements and advising customers on trends in information technology. The company was premised on the idea that there was tremendous promise in communications technology and that an international approach was warranted. Accordingly, Logica's first overseas office, in the Netherlands, was opened in 1973, the same year that turnover exceeded £1 million for the first time. Overall, Logica played a role in putting into use many of the components that later made the Internet a large-scale success.

Logica had a major success that gave it visibility when it won the design of the SWIFT network for international money transfers in 1972–73. The company produced a whole new production, transmission and management system for the BBC in the late 1970s. Another involved the first bank cash dispenser in the UK. The company's staffing levels were around 200 employees in the early years, and their successes at pulling off large-scale and difficult projects garnered them a reputation for technical excellence and able management.

McNeil led the teams that did many of the company's early projects. He left Logica in 1977 and ended up in a successful career as a novelist and a writer for BBC dramas.

In 1974, Logica, together with the French company SESA, set up a joint venture, Sesa-Logica, to undertake the Euronet development. The project, with the support of partners throughout Europe and the assistance of Bolt, Beranek and Newman in Cambridge, Massachusetts, used the packet switching technology of the NPL network and ARPANET and X.25 protocols to form virtual circuits. It established a network linking research centres in a number of European countries. They hired Roger Scantlebury in 1977 who had worked on the European Informatics Network, a datagram network linking CERN, the French research centre INRIA and the UK’s National Physical Laboratory.

Logica set up operating subsidiaries in the Sweden and the United States in 1977.

While there were many other British computer services firms started up during this period, most ended up being bought out by bigger companies or overseas services firms. As such Logica became the dominant independent UK computer services company.

The firm was involved in the development of the original automatic train control system for San Francisco Bay Area Rapid Transit (BART) in the late 1970s and early 1980s as part of the original construction of BART.

=== Logica VTS ===
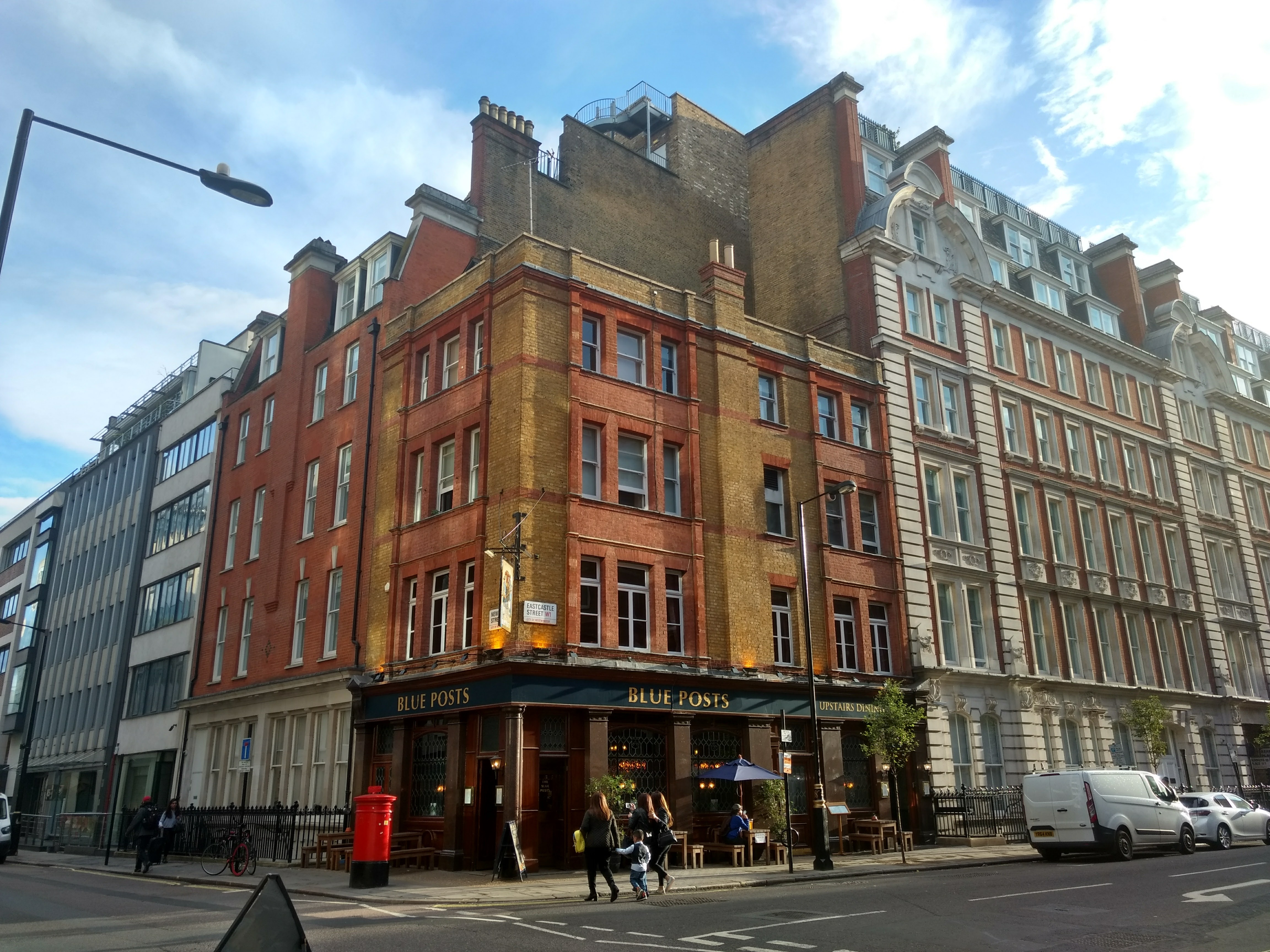
84, Newman Street, first silver-grey building on the left, housed Logica VTS (here seen in 2017)

In 1975, Logica developed the first electronic typing pool – Unicom – for Unilever. This development allowed the functions of a typing pool to be automated into a single system supporting about 50 workstations.

With the support of the UK's National Enterprise Board, in January 1979 the company established a new subsidiary to exploit this technology, Logica VTS. A range of standalone word processors, the VTS 100, the VTS 2200 ("Whirlwind") and, finally, the VTS 2300 ("Kennet"), were developed and were manufactured at a purpose built factory in Swindon. These machines were sold internationally by BT and by International Computers Ltd, and were amongst the first word processors to achieve mass sales.

The advent of the personal computer, and software such as WordPerfect, led to the decline of this business and its ultimate closure.

In connection with office automation, Logica VTS also engaged in product work related to local area networking, putting out a product called Polynet in 1981 which was based upon the Cambridge Ring idea rather than Ethernet. This aspect of business was still going in 1984, with Logica founder Pat Coen as managing director of Logica VTS.

By the end of 1985, Logica had decided to exit the office automation business, and Logica VTS was shut down over the course of 1986.

=== Software Products Group, Rapport, and Xenix ===
Most of Logica's software products were used only internally, as part of reusing implementation parts of the contracting projects it engaged in. However, Logica staged a foray into the wider software products world in the early-mid 1980s, creating the Software Products Group. The director of the group was Gordon Kirk.

Logica Rapport was an early relational database management system that was developed internally in 1977 and began selling as a general product in 1979, with another release in 1980. Micro Rapport was also released, for the Zilog Z80. By 1986, support for Rapport was being phased out by Logica, to the consternation of some organisations using it.

Xenix was a version of the Unix operating system that Microsoft worked on; in 1982 they engaged with the Santa Cruz Operation (SCO) in this work, with the two companies' engineers working together on improvements. Microsoft and SCO then further engaged Human Computing Resources in Canada, and the Software Products Group within Logica in the United Kingdom, as part of making further improvements to Xenix and porting Xenix to other platforms. In doing so, Microsoft gave HCR and Logica the rights to do Xenix ports and license Xenix binaries in those territories, which for Logica included all of Europe. This second source agreement was formalised between Microsoft and Logica in January 1983.

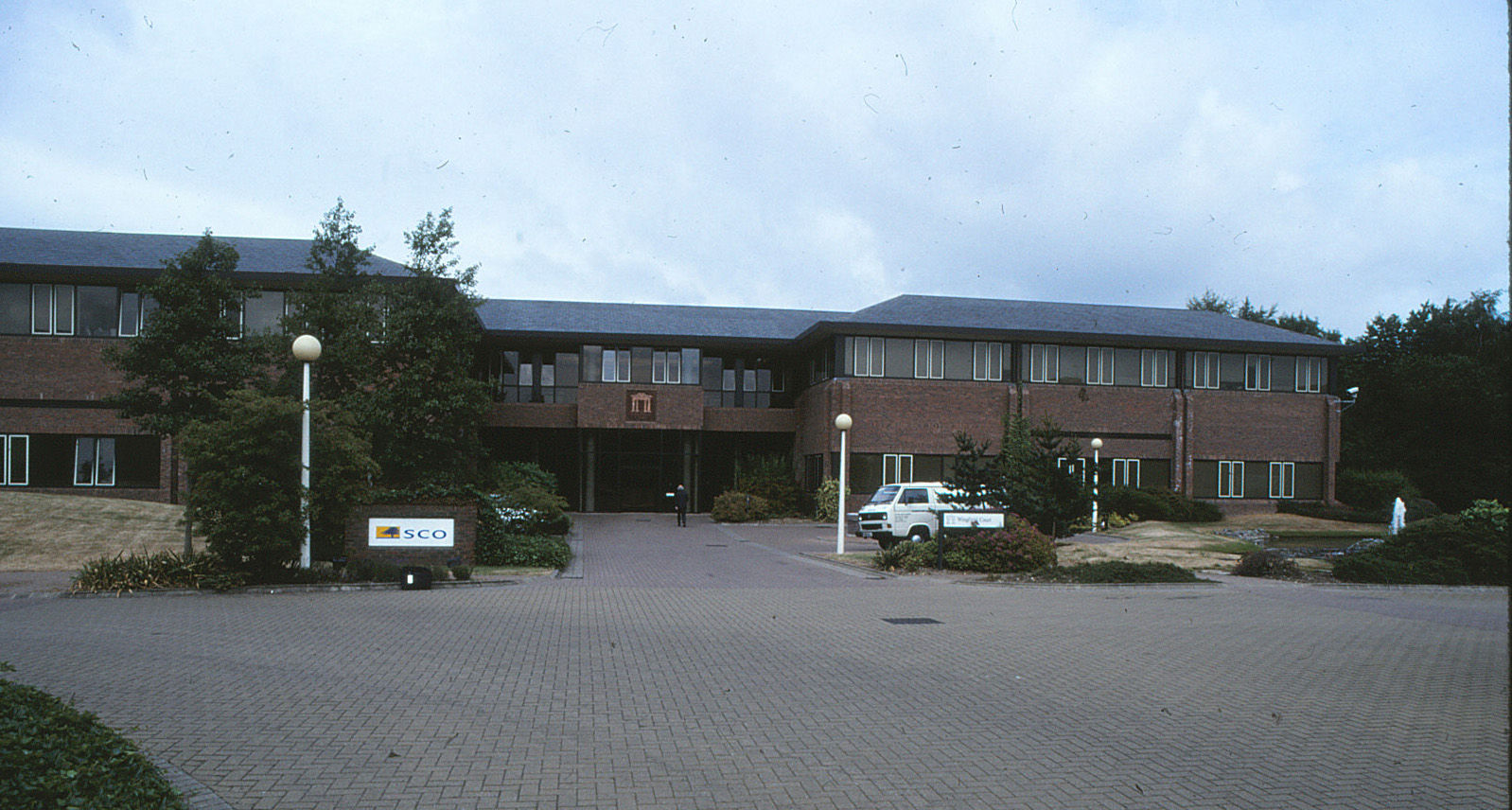
After being acquired by SCO, the Logica Software Products Group subsequently had its offices at the Croxley Centre in Watford

This Logica group put out several releases, including Xenix 3.0 in 1984, which was based on UNIX System III for 16-bit processors with some Berkeley Software Distribution networking functionality and improved compatibility with MS-DOS. Logica stated that it had over 300 clients for its Xenix product, including other computer manufacturers such as Acorn Computers, Plessey Microsystems, SAGEM, Regnecentralen, and Triumph-Adler, indirect sales through resellers, and direct sales to end customers such as Chemical Bank, West Midlands County Council, and Natural Environment Research Council. Logica's positioning of Xenix included features making it easier to use. However, during 1986, Logica decided to withdraw from Xenix operations.

The Software Products Group was acquired by SCO in December 1986; it became a wholly owned subsidiary, the Santa Cruz Operation Limited, and the basis for SCO's UK operation, with its office subsequently being relocated first to Soho and then to Watford outside London. Initially supplemented by some engineers who transferred from SCO's headquarters operation in Santa Cruz, California, the ex-Logica group now in Watford became one of the major development sites for SCO and over the next few years did the operating system kernel development work behind the subsequent SCO OpenDesktop and SCO OpenServer product releases, as well as later working in networking, security, escalations, and other areas, in addition to being the sales, marketing, and customer engineering hub for SCO's (and later Caldera International's) EMEA region (although most development work in Watford was shut down in 2000).

=== Public company and the David Mann era ===
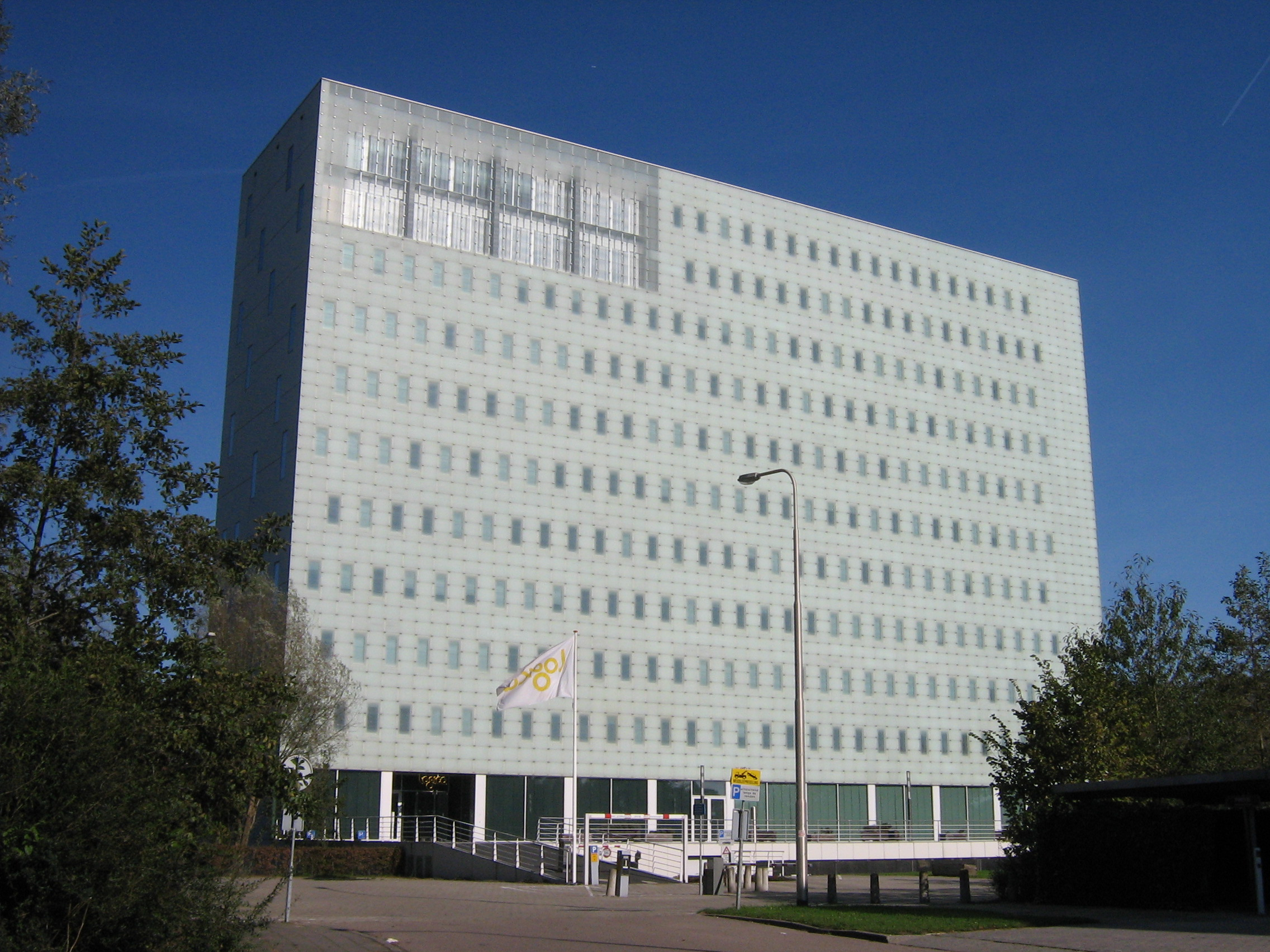
Logica offices in Amstelveen in the Netherlands

The company floated on the London Stock Exchange on 26 October 1983. The company had 1,000 employees at this time, and they were major shareholders, owning some 40 percent of the firm. However the stock price remained flat during this time, and indeed would for much of the next ten years.

In 1985 they were faced with a hostile takeover bid by the Ross Perot-led competitor Electronic Data Systems (EDS), but they were able to fend it off. Around this time the UK trade magazine Computing named Logica as the "Company of the Decade".

In 1984 the company developed the automated clearing system for the UK banks (CHAPS) as well as the Customer Service System for British Telecommunications (BT/CSS), the £1bn total implementation, represented largest computer project undertaken in Europe and the largest integrated database in the world.

Logica pioneered the automated ticketing system for London Underground in 1987 and a new version of the system which randomly generates Premium Bond numbers (ERNIE) in 1988.

Logica set up joint ventures in Hong Kong with Jardine Matheson to undertake the real time trading system for the new integrated Hong Kong Stock Exchange in 1984, in Italy with Finsiel in 1993, and in the UK with British Airways in 1990 to undertake the development of computer systems for the airline and then sell them to other airlines. The company's research and development arm was known as Logica Cambridge and located in Cambridge, England.

Logica's competitors in the IT services and contracting realm in general included not just EDS but also Andersen Consulting, Cap Gemini Sogeti, and the Sema Group, as well as in specialty areas (such as banking) Hoskyns Group, Admiral Consulting, and Advanced Computer Techniques.

Near-original employee David Mann became managing director and CEO of the company in 1987. Founder Philip Hughes resigned as chairman of the board of directors in 1990, and left the board entirely in 1995, focusing instead on a completely different career as a very successful landscape painter. Other original founders of the company were also playing a lesser role at this point.

During the late 1980s and early 1990s the company was led by David Mann. During this period the company's turnover fell flat, and it suffered a loss in 1991, as it struggled with the effects of the early 1990s recession, especially among customers in the financial services industry. There were also problems in the Logica US subsidiary, and changes in the software marketplace. The company gained a reputation for emphasizing the creation of technically difficult, bespoke solutions, but ones that did not always maximise customer or shareholder value. Logica was a pioneer in the development of Text messageing systems for Mobiles making their first sale to Vodafone. By February 1994, Mann was out as CEO.

=== Martin Read era ===
Martin Read was recruited from GEC Marconi, where he had worked for Arnold Weinstock, and appointed CEO in August 1993. Most of the executive directors left the company during the two years following his appointment – David Mann, Colin Rowland, Andrew Karney, Ian Macleod and Cliff Preddy.

By 1994 the company had some 3,400 employees.

Defence work was still going on within the company, being done both by both Logica plc and by a specific group known as Logica, Defence and Civil Government.

By the close of the 1990s, Logica had seen large-scale growth, with an average annual earnings increase of 35 percent over the previous five years and an increase in the company's market capitalisation from £130 million in August 1993 to £6.1 billion in December 1999. Logica had 8,500 employees and had gained entry into the FTSE 100. Its customers included large governmental organizations and private companies such as Ford, Exxon, IBM, Compaq, Vodafone, Reuters, Merrill Lynch, Prudential, Deutsche Bank, and Diageo.

In 1999 the buyout of the in-house Customer Care and Billing product division took place leading to the founding of the company that would become Cerillion.

In 2000, Logica acquired the German computing services business PDV for £370 million, increasing the size of the German workforce by 1,200 in the process.

In 2001 the company secured an outsourcing contract to create and operate a new case management system for the Crown Prosecution Service. At this time the level of Read's remuneration received attention when it was revealed that he enjoyed a £28 million pay packet.

=== LogicaCMG ===
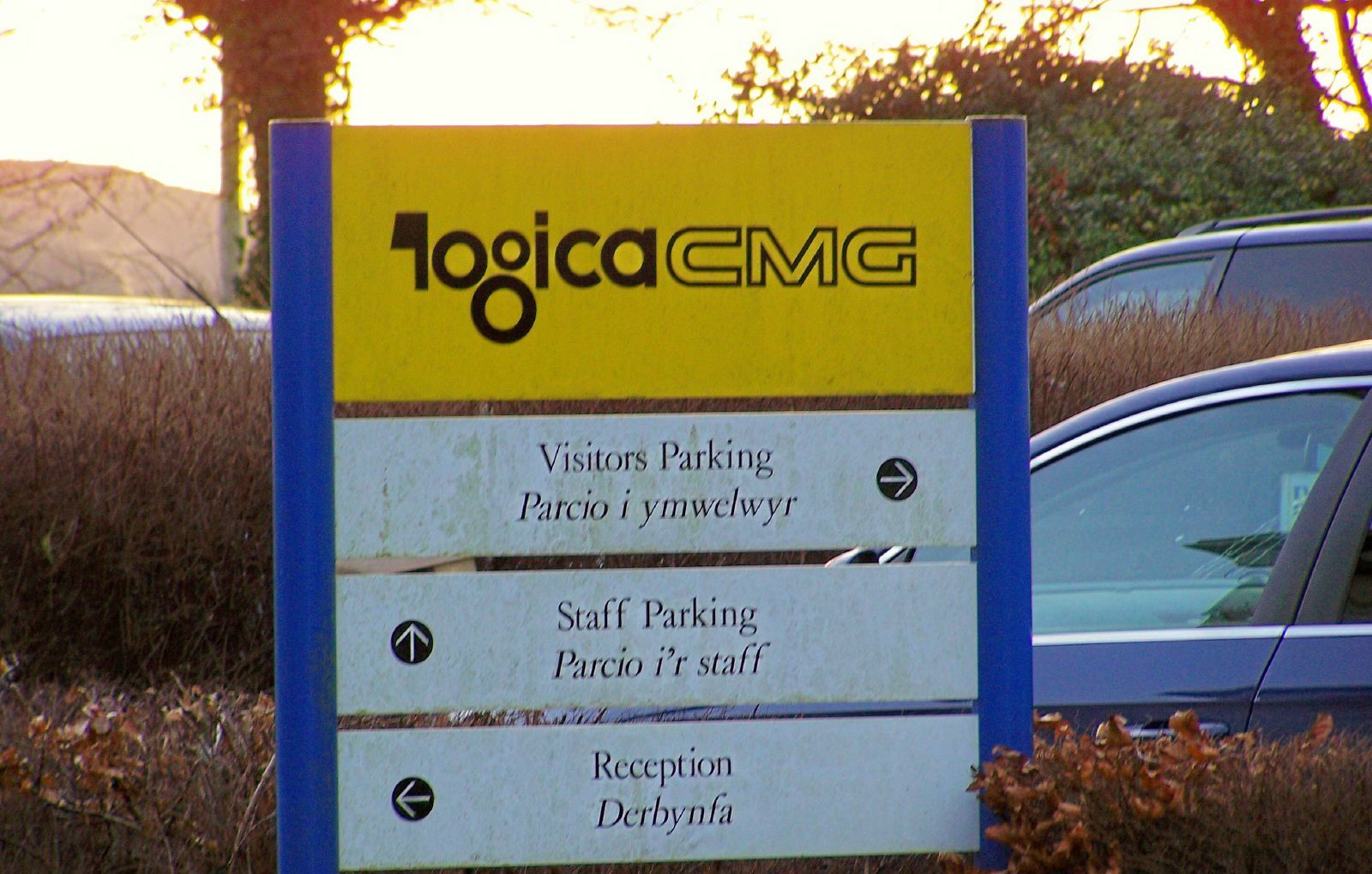
LogicaCMG logo and parking signs at Wales offices, 2006

The merger of Logica (60 percent) with British company CMG (40 percent) to form LogicaCMG on 30 December 2002 united an established technology firm (Logica) with an established consulting firm (CMG).

In December 2003, LogicaCMG’s software controlled the doomed Beagle 2 probe after separation from the Mars Express orbiter.

During the mid-2000s the company embarked on a series of acquisitions of Continental European firms. In 2005, LogicaCMG purchased 60 percent of the Portuguese company Edinfor (and in March 2008 purchased the remaining portion). In 2006, LogicaCMG purchased the French company Unilog for £631 million and the Swedish company WM-data for £876 million.

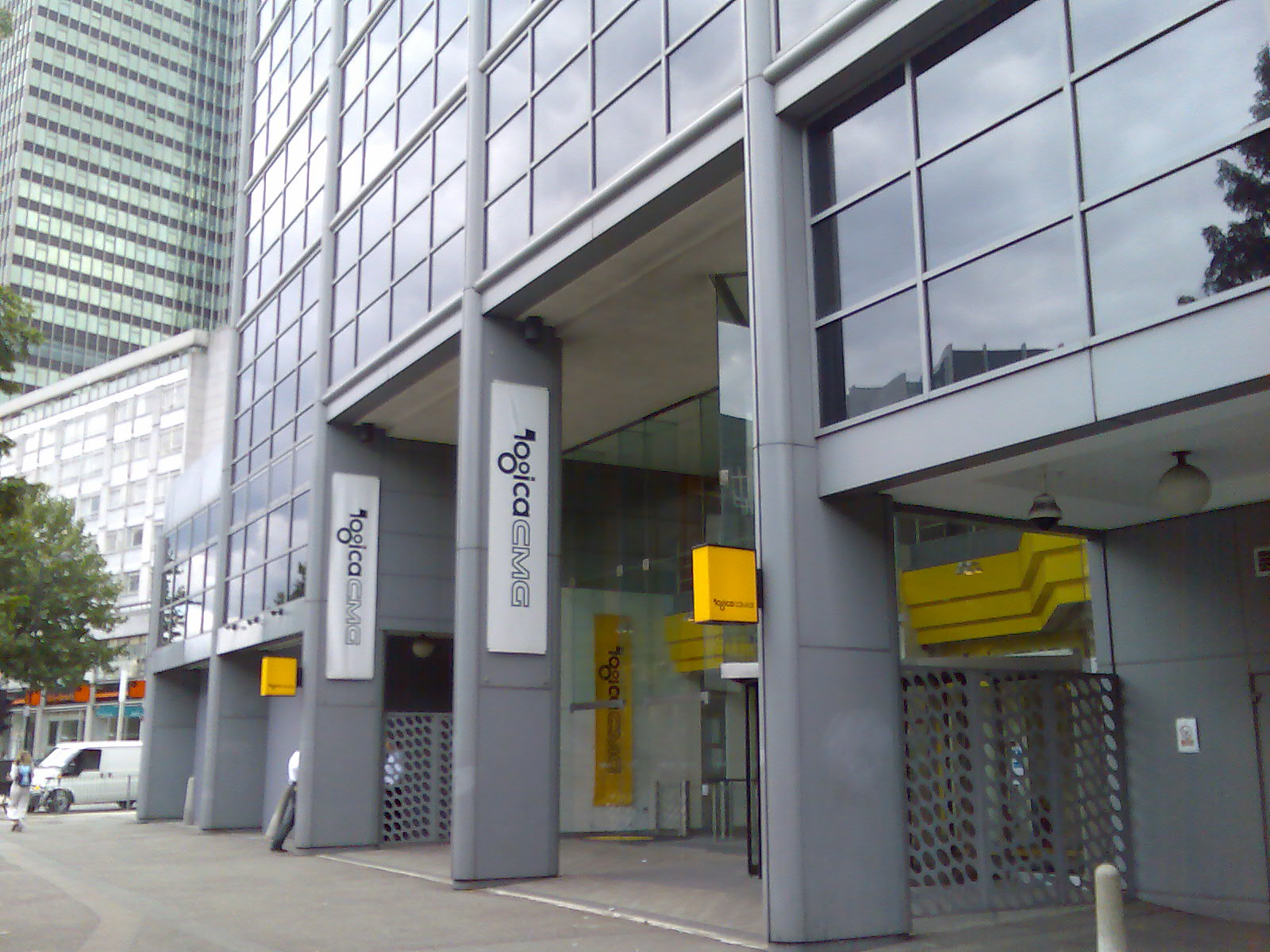
LogicaCMG offices on Hampstead Road in London, 2007

The company suffered some embarrassment in 2006 when laptops containing police payroll data were stolen from LogicaCMG and an outsourcing contract with Transport for London for IT services was terminated early after disputes over payments and service level agreements.

By 2007, the firm had some 39,000 employees and offices in 36 countries, and was one of Europe's largest IT services and outsourcing firms. Its largest locations in terms of employees counts were France, the Netherlands, and the United Kingdom, in that order. Its most profitable sales regions were the UK, France, the Netherlands, and Scandinavia.

On 20 February 2007, LogicaCMG Telecom Products was sold for £265m (US $525m) to private investors Atlantic Bridge Ventures and Access Industries, and became known as Acision.

Following a profit warning in 2007, shareholders became increasingly skeptical about the wisdom of the European acquisitions strategy, and Martin Read was forced out as CEO by these shareholders.

=== Return to Logica ===
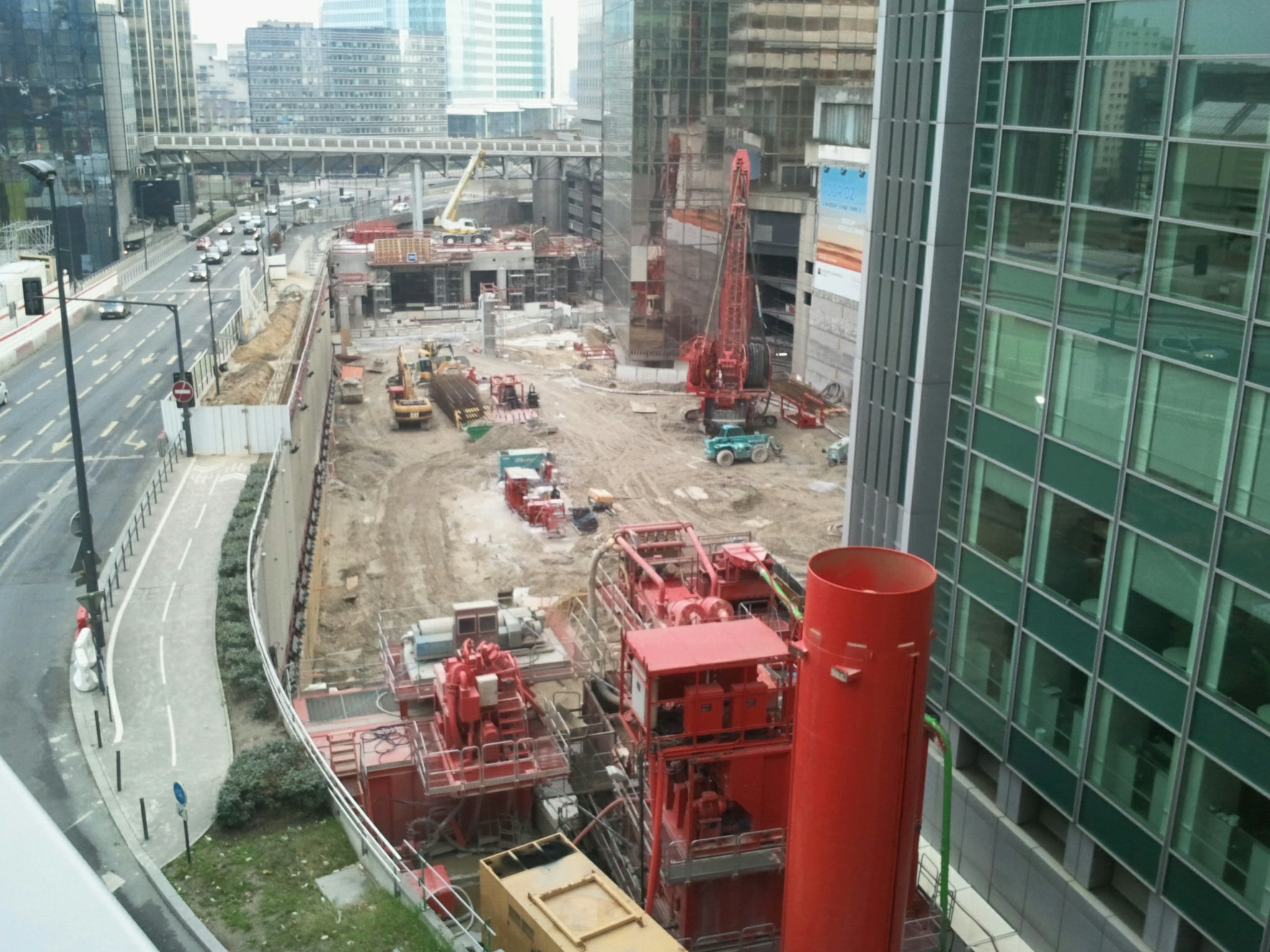
Logica building (near right) in the La Défense complex outside of Paris, early 2012

Andy Green was recruited as the new CEO and took office from 1 January 2008.

On 27 February 2008, the company changed its name back to Logica. Nevertheless news accounts often referred to the company as being Anglo-Dutch.

In April 2008 Green announced a major restructuring programme for the company, leading to 1,300 job losses. In May 2008 the company announced that it would offshore more of its activities including SAP support and HR and payroll administration to Makati in the Philippines, and saw a subsequent increase in its outsourced HR and payroll services business to more than 850 customer organisations.

Beginning in late 2009, Logica's revenues suffered from the effects of the European debt crisis. In December 2011, Logica announced it would cut 1,300 jobs or around 3 percent of the workforce spread across Benelux, the United Kingdom and Sweden, to save 50 to 60 million pounds a year from the second half of 2012. Logica's shares fell to half their value from a year prior. Gradually the outsourcing component came to represent some 45 percent of the company's overall business.

=== Acquisition by CGI ===
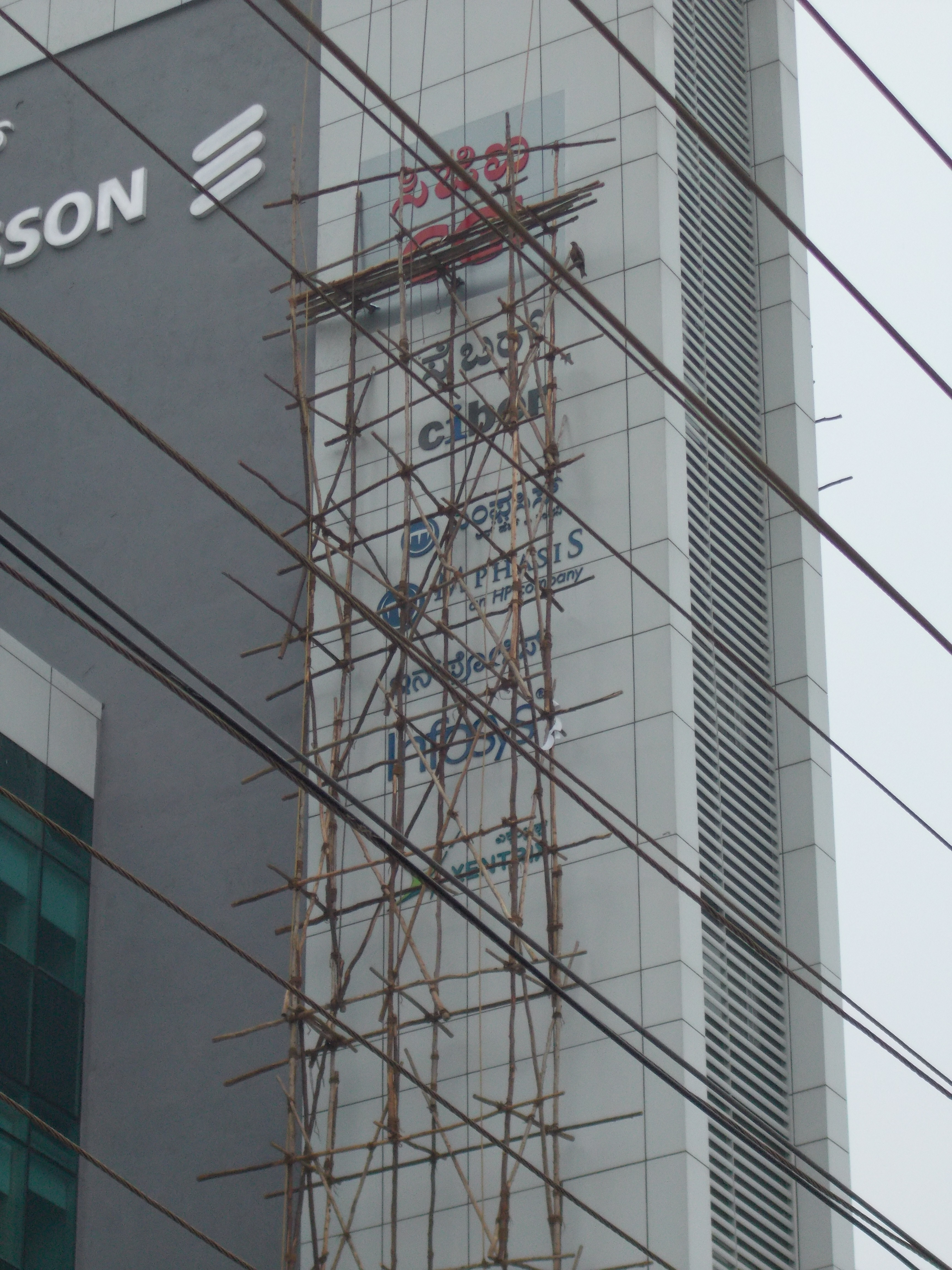
The Logica name being replaced by CGI on a building in Bangalore, India, following Logica being acquired

On 31 May 2012, Canada's CGI Inc agreed to buy Logica in a £1.7 billion cash deal. The acquisition would give CGI a large presence in Europe for the first time and make it the sixth-largest IT services provider in the world. The acquisition was completed on 20 August 2012.

At the time of the acquisition, CGI had some 35,000 employees compared to Logica's 40,000; following elimination of redundancies, around 71,000 employees were in the newly merged company. By March 2013, Logica had been fully integrated into CGI and the Logica brand name disappeared from use.

== Operations ==
Logica was a management consultancy, outsourcing and IT services and solutions company. Its activities included:

- Supporting the missions of over 150 orbiting satellites.
- Processing more than $100 billion of salaries globally each year.
- Supporting 300 telecoms operators in 130 countries.

== LogiBods ==
Some Former Logica staff have referred to themselves as a "LogiBod".

During the 1980s and 1990s Logica ran an extensive graduate recruitment programme that resulted in the company having a relatively young workforce.

There is an independently operated alumni society, run by former employees, to cater for nostalgic needs of LogiBods and help them keep in touch.

== See also ==
- Defence Information Infrastructure
