= Nanded City, Pune =

Residential township in Pune, India

Coordinates: 18°30′54″N 73°55′35″E

Nanded City
- Interactive map of Nanded City

General information
- Location: Nanded, Pune, India
- Status: Ongoing project
- Category: Residential and Commercial
- Area: 700 acres (280 ha)

Construction
- Constructed: 2010-present
- Architect: Nanded City Development and Construction Company Limited

Other information
- Governing body: Nanded City Development and Construction Company Limited

Nanded City is a 700-acre, gated community located in Nanded, Pune, India. It is named after erstwhile Nanded village on whose farmlands it is being built.

It has a commercial area, residential area, hospital with several specialisations, an urban park named "Stream Park", a shopping complex named "Destination Centre" and schools. Around 30% of the area is made up of green cover. Construction began in 2010 and continues as of 2026.

== Management ==
The Nanded City Development and Construction Company Limited is the governing body. Satish Magar is the chairman & managing director of the township.

== Commercial establishments ==
Symphony IT Park
Companies

- Tower B1 - IncubXperts, PrimaVerse, INTECH, ADF STYMER, LogiTrail, PanchRatna Ventures Pvt Ltd, TRIOS coworking, evolvus, PTd CleanTech Solutions.
- Tower B2 - Under construction.

Destination Center

A shopping complex having D-Mart, HDFC Bank, Punjab National Bank, Abs Fitness, and others.

Kridangan

A sports complex having a gymnasium, 1 swimming pool, 4 lawn tennis courts, 1 indoor badminton court, 1 skating rink, and 1 open amphitheater.

== Residential societies ==
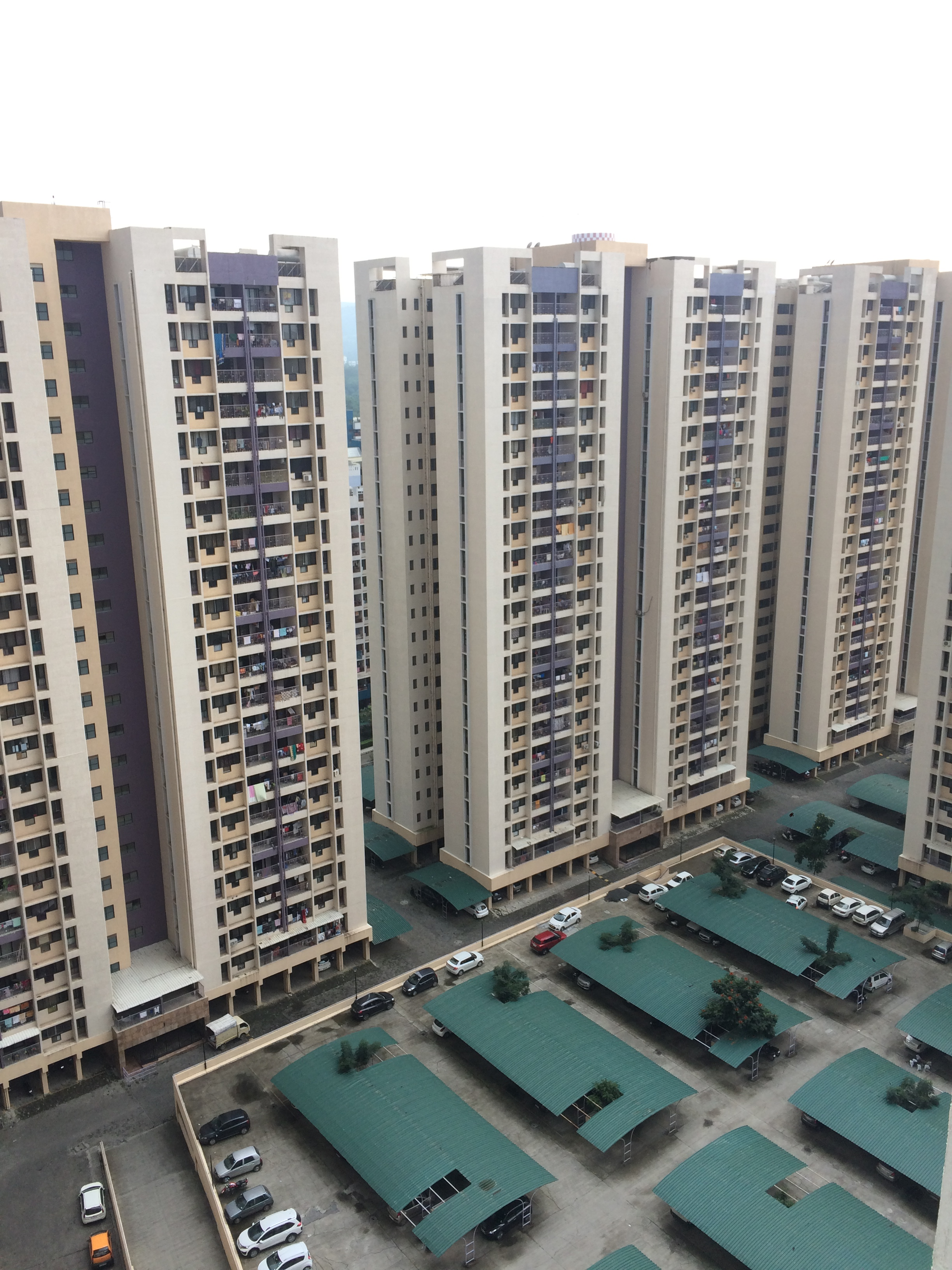
Asawari, Nanded City

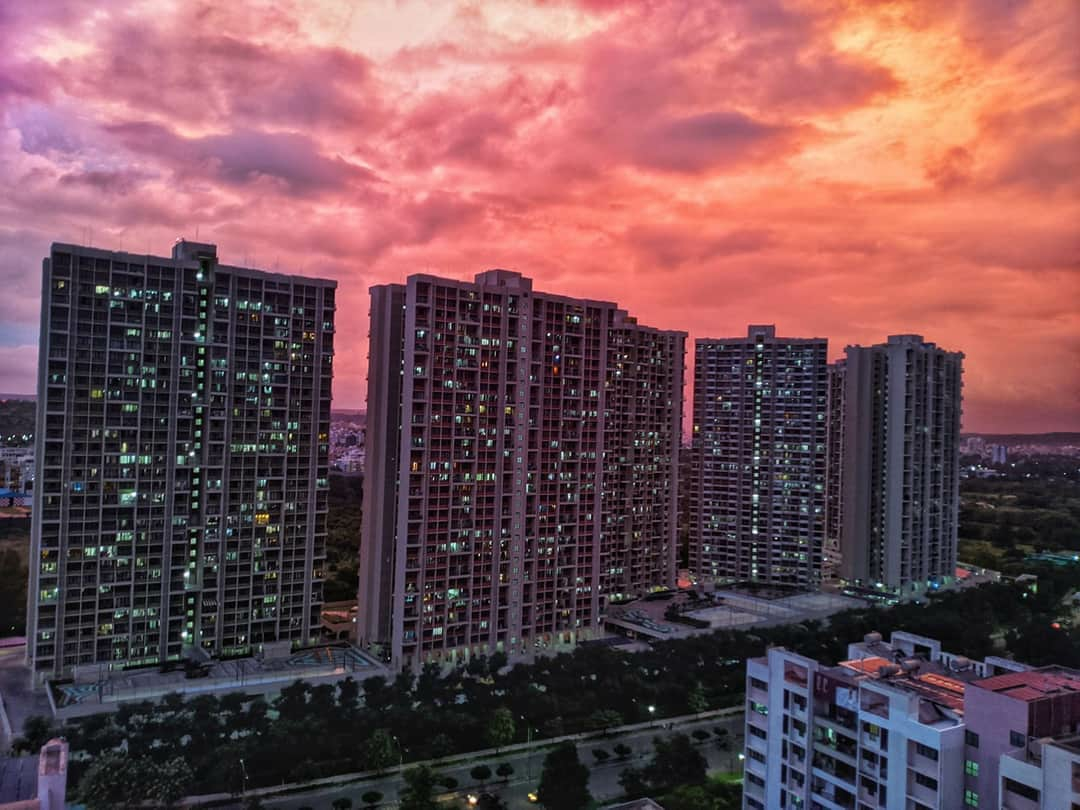
Sargam, Nanded City

Nanded City has the below residential societies. Names of these societies are based on different aspects of Hindustani classical music.

Apartment societies

- Asawari - 2 and 3 BHK society with 11 buildings of 22 floors each.
- Bageshree - 2 BHK society with 5 buildings of 18 floors each.
- Bahaar - 2, 2.5, and 3 BHK society with 6 buildings of 19 floors each.
- Dhanashree - Plot society with 183 plots.
- Janaranjani A, B, C, D (MHADA) - 1 BHK society with numerous buildings of 5/9 floors each.
- Kalashree - 2.5 BHK society with 5 buildings of 18 floors each.
- Lalit - 2.5 BHK society with 6 buildings, 3 with 11 floors and 3 with 22 floors.
- Madhuvanti - 2 BHK society with 23 buildings of 11 floors each.
- Mangal Bhairav - 1 BHK society with 38 buildings of 11 floors each.
- Pancham - 2 BHK society with 4 buildings of 31 floors each.
- Sarang - 2 BHK society with 13 buildings of 11 floors each.
- Sargam - 2, 2.5, and 3 BHK society with 7 buildings of 31 floors each.
- Shubh Kalyan - 3 BHK society with 4 buildings of 22 floors each.
- Sur - 2 and 3 BHK society with 7 buildings of 19 floors each.

Bungalow societies

- Rhythm 1,2,3 - Signature Bungalow plots. Exclusive Club Harmony Membership
- Melody 1,2 - Signature Bungalow plots. Exclusive Club Harmony Membership

== Schools ==
- Nanded City Public School - ICSE board
- Pawar Public School - CBSE board

Both the schools have a large shared playground. The playground is also open to society outside of school hours.

== Stream Park ==
A 7 acres urban park. It has a canal adjacent to it as well as a fish pond in it.

== Awards ==
- Nanded City won the Best Residential Property in affordable segment - Pune.
- Nanded City won the Integrated township of the Year.

== See also ==
- Magarpatta
- Nanded
- Hinjawadi
