= Cerillion =

Software company in United Kingdom

Cerillion Plc
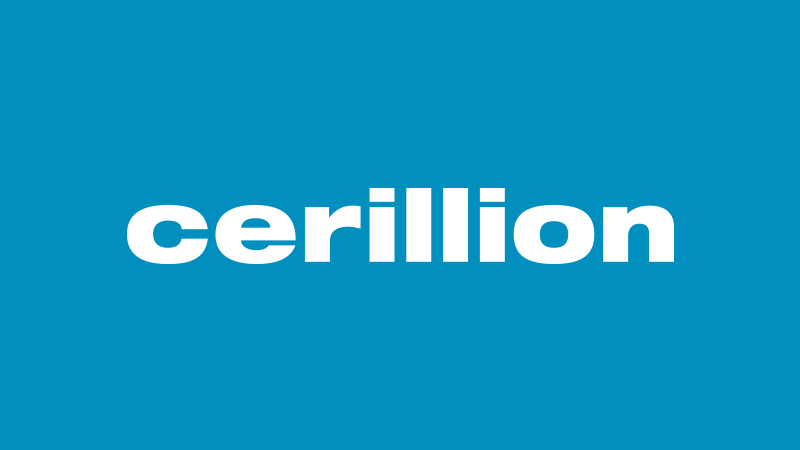
- Type: Public
- Traded as: AIM: CER
- Industry: Telecommunications, Software industry
- Founded: 1999
- Founder: Louis Hall, CEO
- Headquarters: London, United Kingdom
- Products: Business support systems (BSS), Operations support systems (OSS), billing and convergent charging systems, Customer relationship management software
- Website: cerillion.com

Cerillion plc is a United Kingdom-based telecommunications software company that provides business support systems (BSS) and operations support systems (OSS) to communications service providers. Its software platforms support billing, charging, customer relationship management and digital service monetisation for mobile, fixed, broadband and multi-service operators. The company was founded in 1999 following a management buyout of Logica's telecom billing division and is listed on the AIM market of the London Stock Exchange.

== History ==
Louis Hall founded the company in 1999 following the Management Buyout of the in-house Customer Care and Billing product division of Logica.

In 2000, the company partnered up with Isle of Man based Manx Telecom, billing for the world's first commercial UMTS services. This partnership developed further in 2005, with the implementation of its mediation solution in support of Manx Telecom's new High Speed Downlink Packet Access (HSDPA) network. A year later they also helped Manx Telecom become the first combined fixed and mobile telecommunications company in the world to gain BABT approval for its billing accuracy. And in 2013, the partnership with Manx Telecom was extended again with Cerillion selected as their provider for an online charging system.

In 2006, Cerillion was named one of Britain' fastest-growing private technology companies in the Sunday Times Microsoft Tech Track 100. In 2007, the company announced that it would be opening a Global Solutions Centre in India. Following their expansion into India, the company also announced they had secured their first contract for Econet Wireless Kenya (now known as Essar Telecom Kenya). During 2008, Cerillion also launched Cerillion Express, and secured a major deal with BTC Bahamas.

2009 saw the launch of Cerillion's Total Convergence Architecture (TCA) based on the TM Forum's Application Framework. The two following years saw the company secure a strategic partnership with Nokia Siemens Networks, with the launch of NSN's Compact UCB solution.

During 2010, the company was awarded a new multi-site cable billing contract with Columbus Communications, followed by major contracts with both M2 Telecommunications and Truphone in 2012.

In 2013, Cerillion introduced a new Software as a Service (SaaS) billing application, Cerillion Skyline, and launched its Cloud Partner Programme.

On 18 March 2016, Cerillion Technologies became a public company by listing on the AIM market.

In 2020, Cerillion announced its BSS automation technologies as part of the project The Edge in Automation Catalyst, set to be revealed in the Catalyst Interactive Showcase at TM Forum on 7 July. Cerillion is investing with Ciena Blue Planet, IBM and Optare Solutions, with AT&T, BT, Orange, Telecom Italia, Telus, Verizon, Videotron and Vodafone championing the network.

In 2023, Suriname's telecommunications provider, Telesur, implemented Cerillion billing, charging, and customer relationship management software for its mobile services, followed by fixed line in 2024.

In 2026, Cerillion announced its largest contract to date with Oman Telecommunications (Omantel) to deliver its BSS/OSS platform.

== Products and technology ==
Cerillion develops an integrated business support system (BSS) and operations support system (OSS) software platform used by communications service providers to manage the lifecycle of telecommunications services.

The platform includes functionality for customer relationship management (CRM) and customer experience, product catalogue management, order management, convergent charging, billing and revenue management, analytics and reporting, and network and service management.

Cerillion's software is designed to support the monetisation of mobile, fixed, broadband and digital services, and can be deployed in cloud-based or on-premises environments.

Recent versions of the platform have introduced artificial intelligence capabilities, including the use of AI agents to support automation of operational processes.

== Standards and certifications ==
The company's BSS/OSS products support TM Forum Open API standards and the Open Digital Architecture (ODA) framework, which are designed to enable interoperability between telecommunications software platforms.

In 2025, Cerillion achieved "Ready for ODA" status from TM Forum for selected products within its BSS/OSS portfolio.

Cerillion has also achieved certification under the TM Forum Open API programme, including recognition at Diamond level for API conformance.

== Customers and deployments ==
Cerillion's software has been deployed by telecommunications operators in multiple regions, including Europe, the Americas, the Middle East, Africa and Asia-Pacific.

Notable customers include Virgin Media Ireland, Omantel, Telesur and Norlys, where Cerillion's BSS/OSS platform has been used to support billing, customer management and digital service operations.

The company has also undertaken deployments supporting mobile virtual network operators (MVNOs) and converged service providers.
