= Baalbeck International Festival =

Cultural event in Lebanon

Coordinates: 34.00666°N 36.20483°E

The Baalbeck International Festival (Arabic: مهرجانات بعلبك الدولية, romanized: Mahrajānāt Baʿlabakk ad-Duwaliyya; French: Festival International de Baalbeck) is a cultural event in Lebanon. Since 1955, people from around the world have gone to the city of Baalbek in the Beqaa Valley of Lebanon to attend the annual festival. Classical music, dance, theater, opera, and jazz as well as modern world music are performed each July and August in the ancient Roman Acropolis. The presidents of the festival have been as follows: Aimée Kettaneh from 1956 to 1968, Salwa es-Said from 1969 to 1972, May Arida from 1973 to 2010 and Nayla de Freige from 2011 to present.

== History ==
The festivals date back to the mid 20th century with the first organizing activities being held in 1955 as part of the "Touristic Year 1955." After one year, President Camille Chamoun appointed a festival committee with Kettaneh as its President, and named it the Baalbeck International Festival. It became a governmental institution whose goal was to promote tourism and Lebanese culture. The festival was held in July and August in the ruins of the Roman temples. In the early 1960s, it established a drama school called Théâtre Libanais Moderne for the promotion of works done by Lebanese authors.

After the Lebanese Civil War (1975–1990) and the cessation of festival activities for a quarter century, the festival reopened in 1997.

== Festival highlights ==
Ballet

- Ballet Rambert (1959 Beryl Goldwyn)
- The Royal Ballet (1961 Margot Fonteyn, 1964 Fonteyn and Rudolph Nureyev)
- Australian Ballet (1965)
- Bolshoi Ballet (1971)
- Stuttgart Ballet
- Béjart Ballet Lausanne (Maurice Béjart)

Dance

- Caracalla Dance Theatre
- Paul Taylor Dance Company (1970)
- The Dance Theater of Alwin Nikolais (1969)
- The Alvin Ailey Dance Theater
- Lord of the Dance

Jazz

- Ella Fitzgerald (1971)
- Miles Davis (1973)
- Charles Mingus (1974)
- Herbie Hancock Quartet (1998)
- Buena Vista Social Club (2000)
- Gilberto Gil (2002)
- Ahmed Jamal (2003)

Orchestra

- The New York Philharmonic Orchestra (1959)
- Chamber Orchestra of Stuttgart (1960)
- The Pittsburgh Symphony Orchestra (1964)
- Chamber Orchestra of Moscow (1965)
- English Chamber Orchestra (1966)
- Lebanese National Symphony Orchestra (2002, 2019 with Marcel Khalife)
- Santa Cecilia Academy Rome Orchestra

Singers, musicians, actors

- Fairuz (1957–1973, 1998, 2006)
- Umm Kulthoum (1966)
- Joan Baez (1974)
- Nina Simone (1998)
- Charles Aznavour (1999)
- Marcel Khalife (2000, 2015)
- Sting (2001)
- Johnny Hallyday (2003)
- Plácido Domingo (2004)
- Warda Al-Jazairia (2005)
- Jessye Norman (2012)
- Gerard Depardieu (2014)
- Jean Michel Jarre (2016)
- Mika (2016)
- Ibrahim Maalouf (2017)
- Ben Harper (2018)
- Fanny Ardant
- Angela Gheorghiu
- Sabah
- Angelique Kidjo
- Matthieu Chedid

Bands

- Massive Attack (2004)
- Deep Purple (2009)
- Mashrou' Leila
- Toto

Theatre

- Fairuz, the Rahbani Brothers and the Lebanese popular troupe (1957–1973, 1998, 2006)
- Comédie-Française (1961)
- Théâtre National de Belgique
