= CMG (company) =

Former British consulting company

- Type: Public
- Industry: Consulting
- Founded: 1964
- Defunct: 2002
- Fate: Acquired
- Successor: Logica
- Headquarters: London, UK
- Key people: Doug Gorman (Chairman)

CMG (Computer Management Group) was a consulting company focused on telecommunications and computing and based in London, United Kingdom. It was once a constituent of the FTSE 100 Index until it merged with Logica in 2002.

== History ==
The company was founded in 1964 by Bob Collins, Bryan Mills and Chairman Doug Gorman – the first letters of their surnames forming the original company name. In fact, Bob Collins never actually commenced with the company, his place being taken by Bob Fawcett.

CMG started trading in August 1965, when Bryan Mills and Bob Fawcett gave up their jobs (with Burroughs and Honeywell respectively) and started working out of their homes. By late 1965 they had moved into the basement of Doug Gorman's house in Blackheath, South East London. Doug had also left his job and was working full-time for the company having worked out his 3 months notice at Cooper Bros. One of the earliest employees, Barbara Ward, who joined the company in 1965 as a secretary, worked her way up in the company to Group Director of Personnel and became one of the best-paid women in Britain.

By the time she was hired, the founders had developed, and were selling, the Accountants' Time Ledger package. They bought only as much computer time as was needed for the work available, and produced a fully comprehensive package service. In 1966 they opened offices in Davis House in Croydon. A rapid expansion ensued followed by a move to Sunley House in Croydon and offices being opened in the Netherlands in 1969 and later in Germany. In 1985 CMG acquired the bureau business of Baric Computing Services from ICL. This acquisition brought several new locations to its UK business and, when merged with the existing Croydon based bureau operation, formed the basis of CMG's growth in Outsourcing and Managed Services throughout the 1990s.

Although Bryan Mills and Bob Fawcett left CMG in the 1980s, Doug Gorman continued to lead CMG until his death in 1995. Doug Gorman in his role as chairman of CMG was succeeded by Cor Stutterheim. Bob Fawcett died in 2012.

Bryan Mills was interviewed by the IT Archives in 2016 in which he recounted his personal CMG journey.

=== Company values ===
CMG was known for its no-nonsense equality rules, which included eating lunch together daily in "the kitchen", calling all employees by their first names, ranking all employees per company holding each year and publishing this ranking (including salaries!) to its members, and demanding compliance to the company quality system "Commander" by all employees, all of the time. Sanctions included a "CAR" or Corrective Action Request, which could and often did result in demotion (lower ranking and sometimes lower salary). Since the company offered salary services as a product, salary management was understandably an open topic of conversation within CMG walls. All staff were required to wear suits, even junior engineers.

=== Management ===
Each CMG company had approximately 150 employees, with between 60-80 consultants, one managing director (MD), one associate director per 10-12 consultants (AD), one quality manager, one accountant, and one secretary per director. If a company grew to 120 consultants, it was "split" into two. This created a policy of management that depended on CMG Group growth, whereby aspiring directors from the consultancy ranks could be nominated by their MD to take an internal course that was also an assessment. There were no AD's who had not passed the 4-day intensive course, known as the Pre Management Training Course (PMTC).

Groups of companies were divided into Sectors; these were Finance, Insurance, Telecoms, Transport&Industry, Utilities, Commercial (Oil&Gas), Public and Managed Services. Overseeing these were country boards, and above them were the Group Board. Once a year, each company would be visited personally by a delegation of Group Board officers.

=== Initial public offering ===
CMG floated on the London and Amsterdam stock exchanges in December 1995. Until that time, only employees and their immediate families could purchase shares in CMG, and at its peak about 85% of employees owned shares in the company. The IPO had the effect of imposing the first barriers to the company tradition of openness, since not all deals could be openly discussed after going public, and each company holding was beholden to secrecy guidelines. This started a slow change-over in company culture, a trend that increased when other companies were bought and merged into the CMG name.

== Takeovers and merger ==
In July 1998, it purchased COMETH, a French SAP service provider, for $4.5 million. Then in December 1998, it acquired Rohirst, a British-based financial software maker, for $2 million. In February 1999 it bought Hamburg-based Partner Consult and in March 1999 it purchased Belgium-based Soft Guide: both companies were systems consultancies. In April, it acquired Amsterdam's Thijssen Information Systems, an information management firm. At the end of the year it made two more acquisitions: Germany's Banksys Software and France's Eurasoft.

In 2000 it bought Germany's SDC and Britain's Computer Answers International and then in June 2000, it acquired Admiral Computing, another British IT consultancy. It has been agreed that the unusually high price for Goodwill (accounting) spent by CMG on Admiral was the indirect cause of the Logica merger, as the cash position of CMG became compromised the next year when an economic downturn in the Netherlands caused an internal upheaval and later layoffs.

The merger of Logica (60%) with CMG (40%), on 30 December 2002, represented the union of an established technology firm (Logica) with an established consulting firm (CMG).

== Operations ==
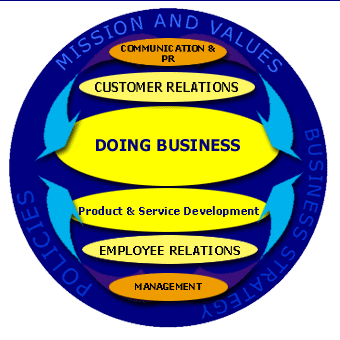
'CMG:Commander' logo, the employee guide that eventually was used against the company in 2002.

CMG supplied services and products in the finance, trade and industry, transport, telecommunications, energy and public sectors. The Company also provided managed information processing services, including networks, payroll and personnel. CMG created its own quality system that it successfully used to gain ISO 9000 accreditation, called 'Commander', which included a Waterfall model of software project management.

Though the most mission critical business process for CMG was always selling consulting services, the company also had a large internal IT department to service the company's infrastructure and manage services for large customer applications. One of the most popular applications which it developed and sold for decades, was PAYFACT, a payroll and HR reporting system that gained widespread use in the Netherlands in the 1990s. Another popular service was short message service centers for mobile telephone operators, using the proprietary EMI protocol. Such large-scale service offerings were managed thanks to strict adherence to Commander, and when Commander did not have the answer, the Commander body of knowledge was extended with the contribution of the company with the specific demand. Commander's added value as a quality system over the years was thus improved and adjusted through proprietary use, as well as from projects for customers or industry standards.

Commander was later used against the company itself in court proceedings in 2002 when the company laid off workers in the Netherlands using legislation regarding temporary personnel. There was a lawsuit brought against CMG using Commander as evidence to show that employees were the responsibility of CMG, and therefore could not be seen as temporary personnel. Despite protests that Commander was proprietary information, the entire Commander cd was released to the court proceedings and became public record.
