= Beryl Goldwyn =

English ballet dancer (1930–2022)

- Born: Beryl Fleur Goldwyn; 31 December 1930; England
- Died: 11 October 2022 (aged 91)
- Occupation: Ballet dancer
- Spouse: Andrew Karney (m. 1969)
- Children: Peter Karney (b.1972)

Beryl Fleur Karney (31 December 1930 – 11 October 2022), also known as Beryl Goldwyn, was an English ballet dancer.

Born near London, she started dancing at the age of three. She studied with Marie Rambert at the Mercury Theatre, Notting Hill Gate alongside Audrey Hepburn and at the Italia Conti Academy of Theatre Arts. She attended the Royal Ballet School and performed with The Royal Ballet in The Sleeping Princess (The Sleeping Beauty) with Dame Margot Fonteyn when the Royal Opera House reopened after the World War II in 1946.

Goldwyn danced in 1946 with the Anglo Polish Ballet, a wartime troupe originally formed to provide work for Polish dancers in exile. The company was disbanded six months later, but not without first dancing at the Saville Theatre on London's West End.

She joined the Ballet Rambert in 1949, later becoming its prima ballerina.

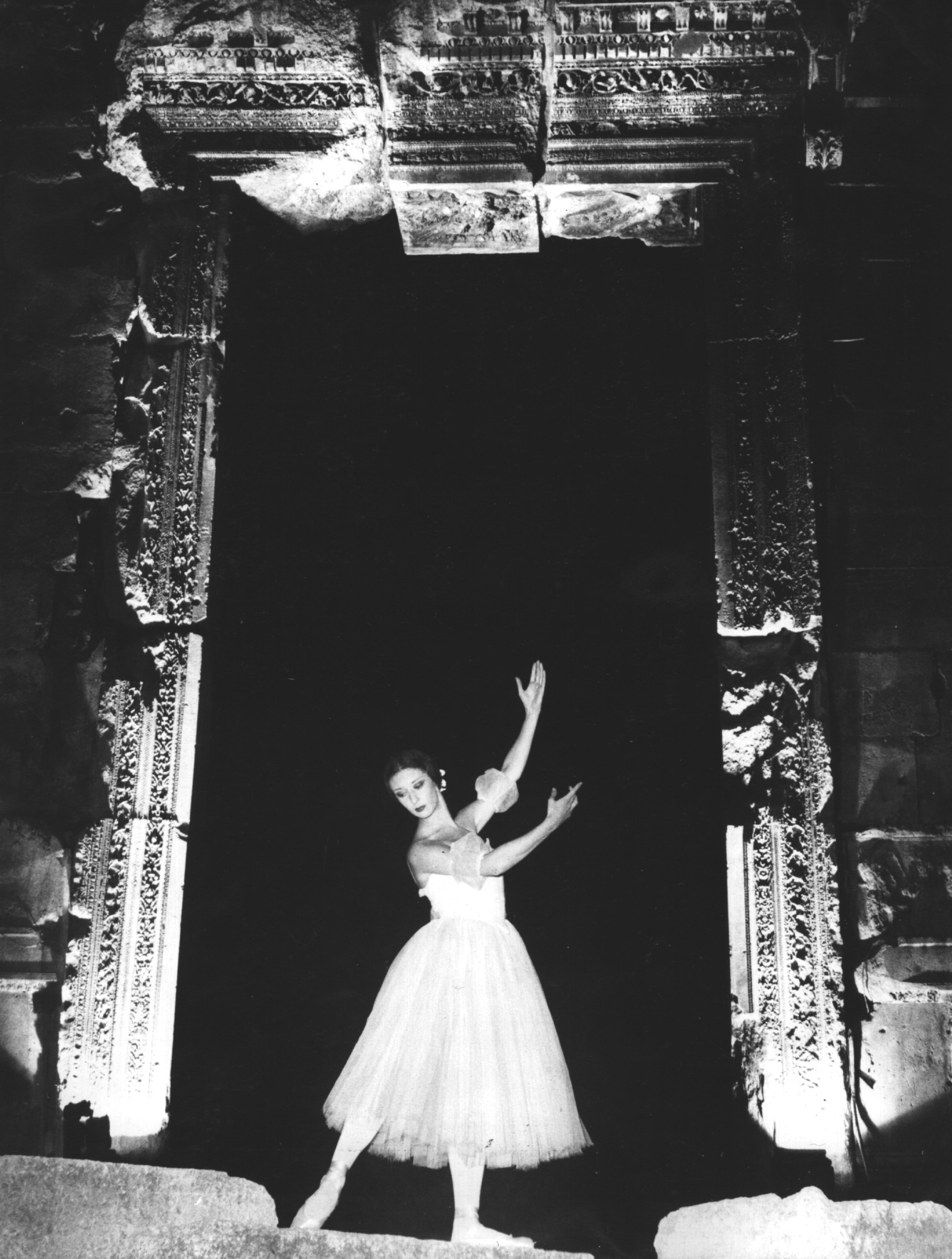
At Baalbeck International Festival

Goldwyn danced numerous roles, including Les Sylphides, The Nutcracker, Gala Performance, and The Sleeping Beauty, She was fortunate early in her career to find an ideal partner in Alexander Bennett. She first impressed with the chamber ballets revived as part of Ballet at Eight, the final performances of Rambert at the tiny Mercury Theatre, Notting Hill Gate. Goldwyn got to know the choreography of Walter Gore and Antony Tudor. Her most celebrated was the part of Giselle. The Times newspaper wrote that she was “the most moving Giselle that Britain can offer”, this was at a time when Margot Fonteyn was also performing the role at the Royal Opera House, Covent Garden. While in The Observer Richard Buckle described what a bore it was “to have to traipse out to Sadler's Wells and see ... some girl one has never heard of in the title role”, but admitted leaving the theatre astonished.

In 1954, when Roberto Rossellini staged Joan of Arc at the Stake at the Stoll Theatre, London, for his wife Ingrid Bergman, it was preceded by the first act of Giselle, ballet critic of the Financial Times Andrew Porter later wrote (in 1971) that "with Beryl Goldwyn as its delightful heroine, the Honegger work (Joan of Ark at the Stake) did not stand much of a chance".

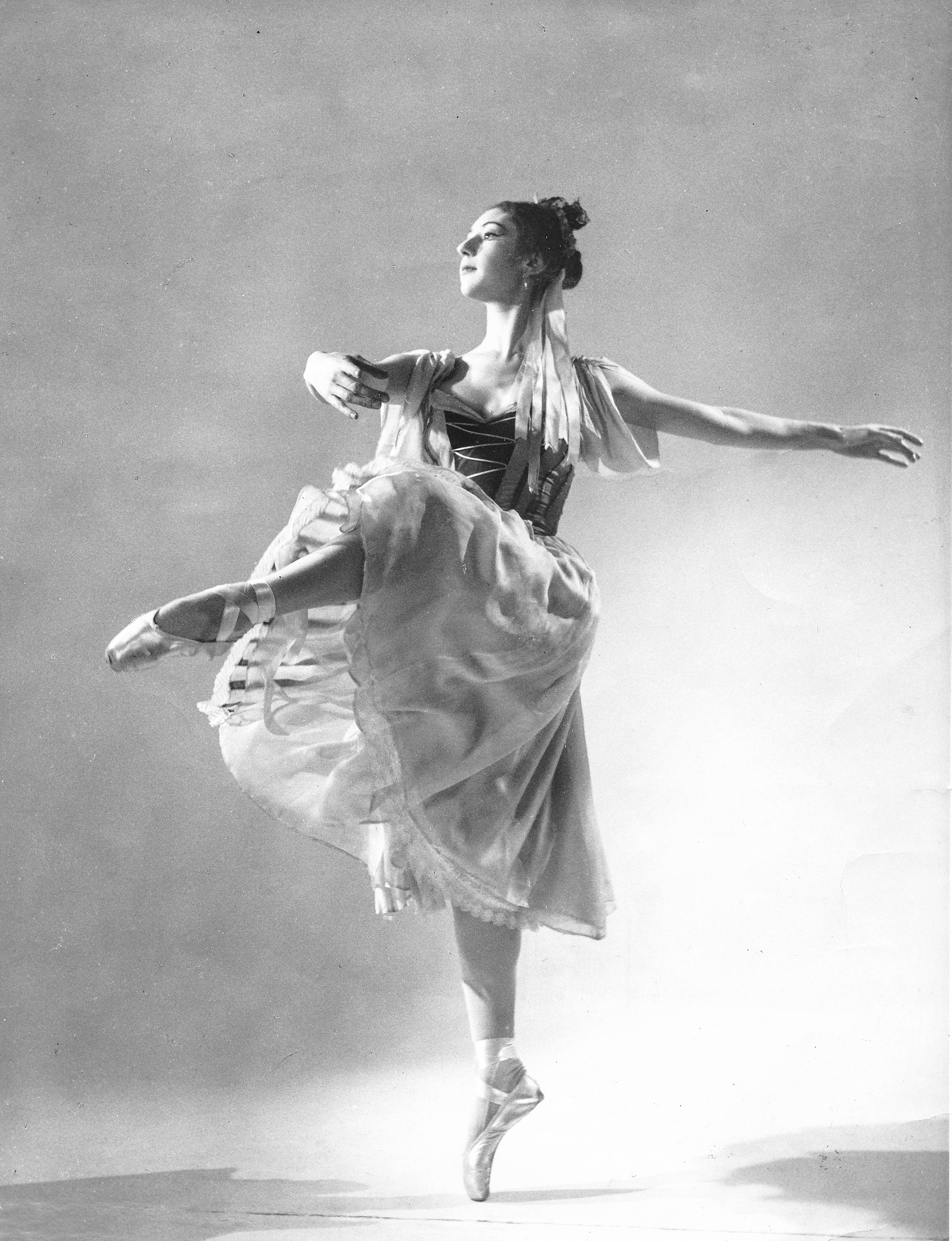

When John Cranko choreographed the two ballets for Rambert: The Lady with her Shadow in Variations on a Theme (1955) and The Girl in Black in La Reja (1959), he chose Goldwyn for the lead roles. Robert Joffrey cast her as Marie Taglioni in his ballet Pas de Déesses.

She performed in the UK, Jersey, Ireland, Belgium, France at Théâtre de la Ville (then known as Théâtre Sarah-Bernhardt) in Paris and at the Aix-les-Bains Festival. She also performed throughout Germany (including West Berlin), Italy at La Fenice in Venice, Bologna at the Teatro Comunale di Bologna, Perugia and Rome at Teatro Eliseo, the United States (at the Jacob's Pillow festival. In 1959 she danced at the Baalbeck International Festival in Lebanon, where she shared the programme with the Lebanese singer Fairuz. In 1996–97, she performed again with The Royal Ballet at the Royal Opera House in Don Quixote, with Sylvie Guillem, fifty years after her first performance there.

She represented ballet dancers on the Council of British Actors Equity and in this capacity, she was consulted before Rudolf Nureyev was granted his work permit to perform in the UK.

Following her retirement from the Ballet Rambert she taught ballet for the Inner London Education Authority. In 1977 she graduated from the Royal Central School of Speech and Drama. She studied painting with Maggi Hambling and exhibited her works at Saint Martin's Gallery in London in May 1991. She also studied flamenco dancing in Seville with Milagros Mengíbar, the celebrated flamenco dancer.

For the 90th birthday celebrations of the Ballet Rambert, she took part in the "Rambert at 90 Oral History Project".

== Personal life and death ==
In 1969, she married scientist, engineer and businessman Andrew Karney; their son Peter was born in 1972. Goldwyn died of cancer on 11 October 2022, at the age of 91.
