= Customer Service System =

The Customer Service System (CSS) of the BT Group (previously British Telecommunications) is the core operational support system for BT, bringing in 70% of income for the company (figures from 1997). BT rolled out CSS nationally in 1989 and provided an integrated system for telephony—order handling, repair handling and billing.

BT Customer Service System (BT/CSS) was developed by Logica in 1984, costing £1bn to implement, representing the largest computer project undertaken in Europe and the largest integrated database in the world, at the time.

In 2005, the CSS databases deployed by BT handled 23 million customers, with 13 terabytes of data spread out over 28 mainframe images. The databases supported 230 million transactions per day generated by over 40,000 users.

CSS is still used by BT but it is now controlled by Openreach. BT retail migrated all accounts from CSS to a new billing system known as Geneva/Oneview/Avalon. This was to support the migration to WLR3.
