= Convergent charging =

Convergent charging and billing (also known as convergent charging, converged charging and convergent billing), is a solution in the telecommunications industry that enables common management of all users and all services for operators. It includes convergence of payment methods like prepaid and postpaid, as well as access methods and services like fixed telephony, mobile telephony, broadband and TV.

== Characteristics ==
Characteristics attributed to a convergent charging & billing system include support for multiple service types such as voice, data, multimedia and content, support for bundling of services and the ability to create a single bill and statement for all communications services including fixed, mobile, broadband and TV.

A converged charging system is described as having the ability to control services and manage balances in real-time. This includes, for example, authenticating the subscriber and checking the account balance before service delivery to the end user. A converged charging system can also notify users when the account balance threshold set by the operator is reached, or terminate service connectivity when real-time charging indicates that credit has been depleted. This real-time capability can be used to deliver promotions and notifications to service users to stimulate usage.

== Rationale ==
The need for convergent charging & billing has been partly explained by consolidation within the communications industry, the launch of new multimedia services and the increasing emergence of multi-play service offerings on mobile networks.

A number of motivations have been suggested to explain why mobile telecoms providers use convergent charging & billing. One is the ability to offer mobile service packages that include both pre- and post-paid services. Another is a sustained drop in Operating Expenditure thanks to reduced billing system complexity, since operators run a single billing platform rather than multiple ones.

The telecoms and software consulting firm Ovum has said that convergent charging can greatly reduce revenue leakage. Swedish telecoms supplier Ericsson has stated that convergent charging & billing can increase marketing flexibility for operators and create revenue growth. Telecommunications software provider Redknee has said that convergent billing allows operators to launch targeted promotions quickly and deliver an improved subscriber experience. Openet reinforces this by saying "Convergent Charging makes it easier for communication service providers to optimize profitability by providing flexibility to deploy any service to any type of subscriber using any payment method with any set of business rules.". Finnish telecoms supplier Nokia Siemens Networks is of the belief that the solution also provides the flexibility and cost transparency that prepaid and postpaid subscribers need to take up new services. Convergent charging & billing has been credited with reduction of OPEX.

== Challenges ==
Challenges to the introduction of convergent charging & billing include migration from existing billing systems for an incumbent telecoms operator. IT research and advisory company Gartner has also highlighted potential migration risks, reservations about return on investment and the need for a business case for making a change. FTS and Aradial has a patent in the Convergent charging area called the DO TREE (Decision Operation Tree).
