= Mavenir Systems =

Mavenir
- Type: Formerly Public
- Traded as: NYSE: MVNR
- Industry: Communication Software
- Founded: Richardson, Texas (2005)
- Founder: Rashad Ali
- Defunct: 2015
- Fate: Acquired by Mitel (2015)
- Successor: Mavenir
- Headquarters: United States
- Key people: Pardeep Kohli (president and CEO
- Revenue: $108 million
- Number of employees: 986

Mavenir Systems was an American software-based telecommunications networking provider based in Richardson, Texas that existed from 2005 until 2015. The company's software was aimed to deliver internet protocol (IP)-based voice, video, rich communications and enhanced messaging services to clients. Mavenir Systems provided service to approximately 120 mobile networks globally.

== Origin ==
Mavenir Systems was founded in 2005, with Rashad Ali as the founder. Pardeep Kohli served as the company's president and CEO.

== History ==
In December 2008, the company completed a funding round for $17.5 million. Another funding round for $13.5 million backed by Alloy Ventures, Austin Ventures and North Bridge Venture Partners was completed in June 2010. The company raised $40 million in a funding round backed by previous investors and Cross Creek Capital. The funding round brought the company's total funding to $105 million. Mavenir Systems placed first on the Metroplex Technology Business Council's Fast Tech list in 2010 with a 479.6 percent growth. Mavenir Systems placed second on the Fast Tech list the following year. In May 2011, Mavenir Systems acquired Airwide Solutions, a Massachusetts-based mobile messaging and wireless internet infrastructure company.

Mavenir Systems provided VoLTE service to MetroPCS in 2012. The company partnered with Radisys in February 2013 on VoLTE deployments in Europe and the United States. 4G Americas, a wireless industry trade association, elected Mavenir Systems to its Board of Governors in April 2013. The company opened a user experience center in Zagreb, Croatia in April 2013. The center intended to demonstrate and bring new offerings for VoWi-Fi, VoLTE and rich communication services (RCS) to the market.

In November 2013, Mavenir Systems became a publicly traded company on the New York Stock Exchange. The company priced its shares at $10 and raised approximately $44.5 million in the initial public offering. Mavenir Systems provided T-Hrvatski Telekom, Croatia's largest telecommunications company with its IMS WebRTC gateway in February 2014. The gateway furthered T-Hrvatski Telekom's Terastream project, a simplified service delivery model. In May, Mavenir Systems released a mobile voice and messaging client software for handsets and tablets. The software was aimed to allow mobile operators to differentiate their Voice over LTE (VoLTE), Voice over WiFi (VoWiFi) and Rich Communication Services (RCS).

The company began developing a VoWiFi mobile app for 3UK on HockeyApp, a service to develop and test mobile apps, in June 2014. The mobile app was intended to provide 3UK subscribers with the ability to make calls and send text messages when out of cellular coverage (VoWiFi). In July 2014, T-Mobile launched its VoLTE service with an IP Multimedia Subsystem (IMS) voice solution developed by Mavenir Systems. T-Mobile was the first major provider to launch VoLTE according to Converge Network Digest.

In November 2014, Mavenir Systems acquired Stoke, a mobile and security gateway company. On January 13, 2015, Mavenir Systems acquired Ulticom Inc, a signaling solutions software provider, for $20 million.

== End ==
In March 2015, Mitel announced to buy Mavenir Systems for $560 million; the acquisition became effective the following month. Thus the first incarnation of Mavenir came to an end.

Two years later, as the result of the merger of established company Xura with the Mavenir Systems part of Mitel and the startup Ranzure, a new company named Mavenir was formed.
