= Boaz Misholi =

Israeli computer specialist

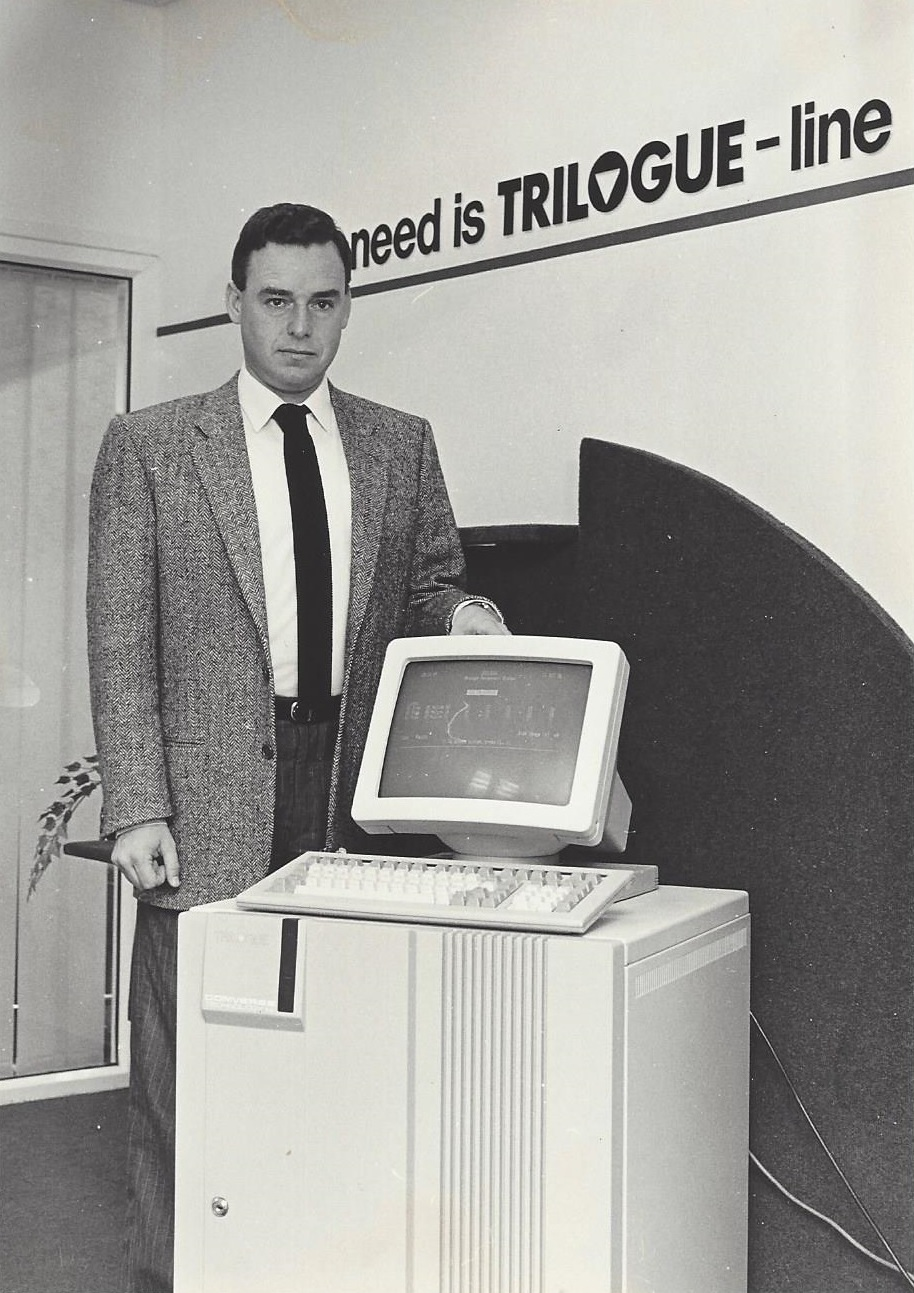
Boaz Misholi

Boaz Misholi (Hebrew: בועז משעולי; born November 11, 1951) is one of the pioneers of high-tech in Israel. He was a co-founder of Comverse, Verint Systems, Telemesser, DSP, Fundtech, Versamed and others, companies which paved the way for the establishment of many other Israeli technology ventures.

== Biography ==
Boaz Misholi was born and raised in Ramat Gan, where he attended Ort Singalovski high school. In the Israel Defense Forces he served in the Paratroopers Brigade of the Nahal. He studied Computer Engineering at the Technion in Haifa, from which he graduated with honors. As a graduate student, he was a teaching assistant at the Technion's Faculty of Electrical Engineering.

== Business career ==
In 1972, Misholi joined Shamoa Electronics and was part of a team that developed the first commercial computer manufactured in Israel and marketed worldwide. From 1975 to 1978, he opened a consulting firm that advised on the use of microprocessors. In 1978, he was invite dto Stamford, Connecticut to oversee the design of an automatic telephone credit verification system using digital voice response technology.

=== Efrat Corporation ===
In 1980, Misholi founded the U.S. based Efrat Corporation, which developed digital signal processing (DSP) technologies and architecture for computerized handling of multimedia. In addition, the company helped design software and hardware for Fujitsu and ITT, which was developing a public switchboard for telephone companies. At this time, Misholi worked on voicemail architecture for storing and transferring multimedia information by computer using a new algorithm to digitally represent speech.

=== Efrat Future Technologies ===
In mid-1982, Misholi cofounded Efrat Future Technologies in Israel based on his patent for a message management system. His partners were Yechiam Yemini of Columbia University and his brother-in-law, Kobi Alexander, then an investment banker in New York. In the original business plan, Misholi was named president, Yemini as chief scientist and Alexander as chief financial officer.

=== Comverse ===
Misholi set out to develop a voice and fax messaging system for storing, processing, accessing and transmitting information from any telephone or fax machine. The system offered a more comprehensive solution than answering machines or other devices available at the time. Aside from the money from the Swiss concern Ascom, Tadiran, Ampal-American Israel Corporation, Shearson, ADP, Lehman Brothers and private American investors, the firm received a grant from Israel's Office of the Chief Scientist and subsidies from the Israeli government, which was trying to boost the country's technology sector. Initially, they began to work on a digital listening system for military intelligence.

Misholi and Alexander concluded that for marketing and raising capital it was preferable to be registered in the United States, with names that rang well in English. Misholi's voice messaging system, originally called "Tavor," was thus renamed "Trilogue." The system was capable of supporting up to 5,000 users, 32 ports and 182 hours of digitized voice storage. Users entered a personal identification code via the telephone keypad to access their mailboxes. The voice mailbox provided a user experience similar to the answering machine but without the need to buy a separate device. In early 1984, Misholi, Alexander and Yemini returned to New York to establish a company for marketing the new technology. Comverse (a combination of "communication" and versatility") was founded that year. The firm was headquartered in Woodbury, New York, and focused on centralized voice and fax-messaging hardware systems for large organizations and telecommunications providers. Efrat operated as a wholly owned subsidiary of Comverse, with Misholi and Alexander as joint CEOs and chairmen. In 1984, Comverse's Trilogue technology was chosen by the United States Government's General Services Administration over IBM and Sperry Corporation. In 1985, the New York Times published a profile on the Israeli economy singling out Misholi as a "new breed of Israeli entrepreneur," and calling him a "whiz kid." In January 1987, Comverse went public on the New York Stock Exchange. In 1988, Misholi resigned as CEO after a disagreement with Alexander over strategy. although he continued as a board member until 1992.

=== DSP ===
In 1986, Misholi joined a team of developers specializing in signal processing and founded CallTalk Ltd. The company, sold and renamed DSP, later split into two companies, one traded on NASDAQ and the other sold to Intel.

=== Aura Investments ===
In 1992, Misholi cofounded Aura, an investment company traded on the Tel Aviv stock exchange. Misholi was chairman and CEO of Aura until 2000. While CEO, Misholi invested in many companies, among them FundTech, Versamed, Magma and Skyline. In 2000, Misholi sold Aura to Yitzhak Tshuva's Green Group. In 2005, Misholi rejoined Aura and changed its focus to real-estate. In the wake of losses due to the real-estate crisis in eastern Europe in 2008-2009, the company was liquidated in 2011.

=== FundTech ===
In 1994, Misholi joined Fundtech, a company that developed software facilitating electronic money transfers between financial institutions. Misholi was active chairman and the first lead investor. The company sold its system to thousands of banks. In early 1998, Fundtech raised additional capital through a public offering and was valuated at $900 million. When Misholi left Fundtech at the end of 1999, it was worth $1.1 billion.

=== Versamed ===
In 1996, Misholi became chairman of Versamed, a medical technology company established in 1994 that developed a mobile ventilation device to replace invasive intubation. Versamed's portable ICU ventilator allows for respiration of patients in transit and emergencies. The product gained FDA approval in 1999. In 2002, Versamed won first place in the Israel Technology Fast 50 list, a list compiled by the Deloitte accounting firm of the fastest-growing technology companies based on revenue growth. The ventilator was sold to hospitals and medical centers worldwide, and was purchased by the Israel Defense Forces for use in combat. In 2008, Versamed was acquired by GE Healthcare.

=== Magma ===
In 1994, Aura purchased shares in Magma Industries, a decorative candle manufacturer. Misholi served as chairman. The candles were sold from carts in shopping malls, gift shops and supermarket chains in the U.S. and Europe, a marketing innovation at the time.

== Other activities ==
Misholi is CEO and chairman of SirTlab Corporation, which is working on a cure for age-related diseases through the activation of the SIRT6 gene.

In 2004, Misholi cofounded D-Cure, a nonprofit organization dedicated to finding a cure for diabetes and promoting diabetes research in Israel. He was also a member of the board of the Israeli Association of Publicly Traded Companies.

== See also ==
- List of Israeli companies quoted on the Nasdaq
