= Sword Ciboodle =

Sword Ciboodle Ltd
- Company type: Private
- Industry: Software
- Founded: 1986
- Defunct: 2014
- Fate: Acquired by KANA Software
- Headquarters: Inchinnan, Scotland, UK
- Key people: Mike Hughes (COO), Steven Thurlow (CTO)
- Products: Ciboodle Flow, Ciboodle One, Ciboodle Crowd, Ciboodle Live
- Number of employees: 300 staff located across 5 continents
- Website: www.sword-ciboodle.com

Sword Ciboodle was a Scottish company specializing in Customer Relationship Management (CRM) software solutions. It had regional offices in North America, South Africa and Asia Pacific.

== Overview ==
The company, originally known as Graham Technology plc, was co-founded in 1986 by Dr. Iain M. Graham. It was headquartered in Inchinnan, Scotland, near Glasgow Airport. Sword Ciboodle offered modular CRM software primarily for contact centers, with a focus on integrating multiple social channels.

== History ==
Sword Ciboodle was previously known as Graham Technology plc, co-founded in 1986 by Dr. Iain M. Graham.

On 31 March 2008, Sword Group announced it was acquiring Graham Technology and their Ciboodle product. The company thus became Sword Ciboodle.

On 9 July 2012, Sword Group agreed to sell Ciboodle to KANA Software.

In 2014, KANA Software was purchased by Verint Systems.

== Solutions ==
Sword Ciboodle is modular CRM software for contact centers. The products work across multiple social channels.

The Ciboodle platform consists of:

- Ciboodle One is the desktop which provides a single customer view, for example of all their products and contact history.
- Ciboodle Flow is the Workflow engine for business process automation.
- Ciboodle Live is the Self-service software.
- Ciboodle Crowd provides a social networking service to customers.

The Ciboodle platform was subsumed into other KANA products following the acquisition by Verint.
