= Comverse Technology =

American-Israeli technology company (1982–2013)

Comverse Technology, Inc.
- Type: Public
- Traded as: Nasdaq: CMVT
- Industry: Computer software
- Founded: 1982; 44 years ago, in Israel
- Founder: Jacob "Kobi" Alexander; Boaz Misholi; Yechiam Yemini
- Defunct: 2013
- Fate: divested
- Successor: Comverse, Inc.; Verint Systems; Xura; Amdocs; Mavenir
- Headquarters: Woodbury, Nassau County, New York, United States
- Key people: Charles J. Burdick (last CEO and chairman)
- Revenue: US$1.59 billion (FY 2011)
- Net income: ▲ -US$58.7 million (FY 2011)
- Number of employees: 4,500
- Website: www.cmvt.com

Comverse Technology, Inc. was a technology company located in Woodbury, New York in the United States, that developed and marketed telecommunications software. The company focused on providing value-added services to telecommunication service providers, in particular to mobile network operators. Comverse Technology had several wholly or partly owned subsidiaries. The name "Comverse" is a fusion of the words "communication" and "versatility".

The company was founded in 1982, and went public on the Nasdaq Stock Market in 1986. Led by co-founder and CEO Jacob "Kobi" Alexander, the company originally specialized in centralized hardware/software systems for voice and fax messaging and sold them to telecommunications companies and other large enterprises. Much of its funding came from Israeli government subsidies and tax credits provided to research and development for hi-tech firms. By the mid-1990s, one of its most successful products allowed legal authorities and intelligence agencies to record and store data collected from intercepted communications. Starting in the late 1990s, Comverse's voice messaging software became its main product and the company grew rapidly with the surge in mobile phone use, passing the $1 billion mark in revenues. It established a formidable position in the worldwide mobile voicemail management market and sold a popular short message service center (SMSC) product. While headquartered in the US, most of the company's research and development was done in Israel; Comverse became one of the more visible success stories in Israel's hi-tech industry. It was one of Israel's largest employers of software engineers, was closely followed in the nation's business press, and was the first Israeli-associated company to join the S&P 500 index.

In 2006, Comverse was involved in an options backdating scandal. Alexander and two other top executives were charged in the US with multiple counts of conspiracy, fraud, money laundering and making false filings. Alexander fled the country to Namibia where he fought extensively against extradition. The scandal proved difficult for Comverse Technology to recover from; the company was delisted from Nasdaq, removed from the S&P 500, and spent the next several years consumed by the costly need to restate its financial reports for several years. Additionally affected by the 2008 financial crisis and changes in the mobile phone market, the company underwent several rounds of large-scale layoffs and sold off parts of its business. By 2011, the company began a turnaround.

During 2012 and 2013, Comverse Technology divested itself of all its holdings and ceased to exist. The two independent companies that carried on its most well-known product lines were a newly independent Comverse, Inc. and Verint Systems. After further mergers Comverse, Inc. became Xura in 2015 and then Mavenir in 2017, while part of the Comverse business went to Amdocs in 2015.

== Subsidiaries ==
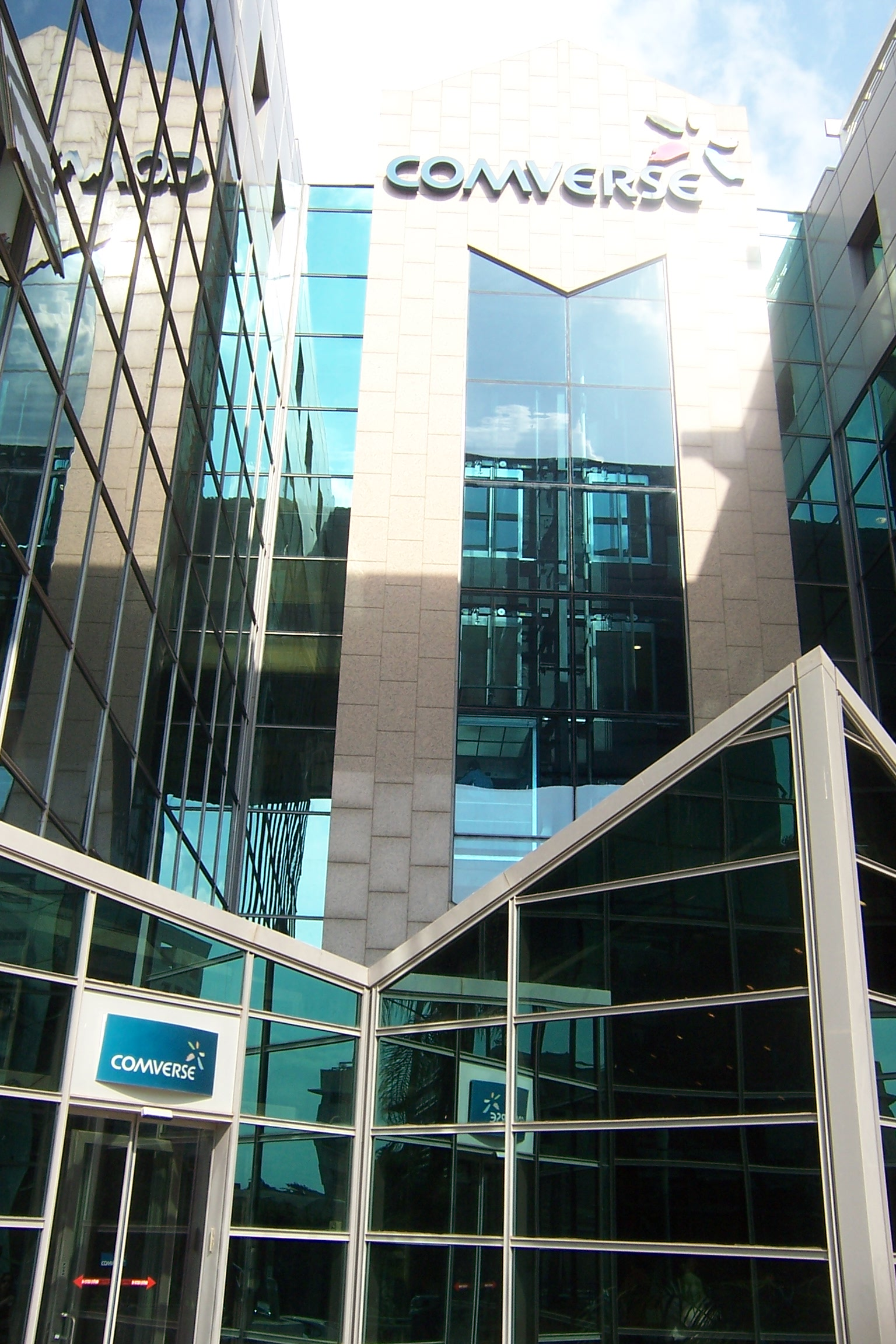
Comverse offices in Tel Aviv, 2006

Comverse Technology had multiple subsidiaries, many of which are still in business. Their activities at the time of their belonging to Comverse Technology were:

- Comverse, also known as Comverse Network Systems or Comverse CNS, was a provider of software and systems enabling value-added services for voice, messaging, mobile Internet and mobile advertising; converged billing and active customer management. Comverse's solutions supported flexible deployment models, including in-network, hosted and managed services, and could run on circuit-switched, IP, IMS, and converged network environments. Comverse's customer base spanned more than 130 countries and covered over 500 communication service providers serving more than two billion subscribers. It typically provided some 70 percent of Comverse Technology's overall revenue. Comverse had 100 local offices in 40 countries, with its corporate headquarters located in Wakefield, Massachusetts, in the United States.
- Verint Systems (which, from 1999 to 2002, was known as Comverse Infosys) was a provider of solutions for analysis of intercepted communications, digital video-focused security and surveillance, and analytics and business intelligence for the enterprise. Their products were aimed at enabling government and enterprises to make sense of the vast information they collected to meet performance and security goals. Verint solutions were used by more than 10,000 organizations in 150 countries. Verint was headquartered in Melville, New York, with offices worldwide and 2500 employees around the globe. By 2011, Verint was 52 percent owned by Comverse Technology.
- Ulticom provided signaling solutions for wireless, wireline, and Internet communications. Ulticom's products were used by telecommunication equipment and service providers worldwide to deploy mobility, location, payment, switching, and messaging services. Ulticom was headquartered in Mount Laurel, New Jersey, with additional offices in the United States, Europe, and Asia. Comverse acquired Ulticom in 1996 and sold it in 2010.
- Startel sold integrated voice, data and networking solutions for use in call centers worldwide. It was originally an independent company that was acquired by Comverse Technology in 1992. Startel was sold to financier Bill Robertshaw in the late 2000s and then became employee-owned in 2011.
- Starhome provided roaming services for mobile network operators. The Starhome portfolio included international roaming services and core network solutions across various technologies, including intelligent networks and next-generation networks. It was fully owned by Comverse Technology until being sold to Fortissimo Capital in 2012 for $54 million.
- ComSor was a venture capital operation, created as a subsidiary in partnership with Soros Fund Management, that invested in start-up companies directly and was active in the late 1990s and early 2000s.

== History ==
=== Origins ===
The company's origins date to 1982 (or 1983, sources differ), when three Israelis, aspiring investment banker Jacob "Kobi" Alexander of Shearson Loeb Rhoades, engineer Boaz Misholi, and Alexander brother-in-law and Columbia University computer science professor Yechiam Yemini, got together and founded an Israeli start-up company, Efrat Future Technologies Ltd. In a meeting in New York, Misholi had the idea of building a business around centralized hardware systems to support voice and fax messaging and selling them to telecommunications companies and other large enterprises, who could then resell the voice and fax services to their customers. The three quickly returned to Israel and started the company, with the goal of securing Israeli government grants to fund the research and development work.

The early years of the company were difficult; in 1984, they founded Comverse in the United States, which became the parent company of Efrat. The name "Comverse" was chosen as a fusion of the words "communication" and "versatility".

In 1986 Comverse went public on the Nasdaq Stock Market with a $20 million valuation; the company used the money so gained as its final round of funding. The three founders had trouble working with each other, and Yemini divorced Alexander's sister; in 1987, Alexander was left with sole control of the company after the other two pulled out. The company was a penny stock on the edge of collapse.

=== Early successes ===
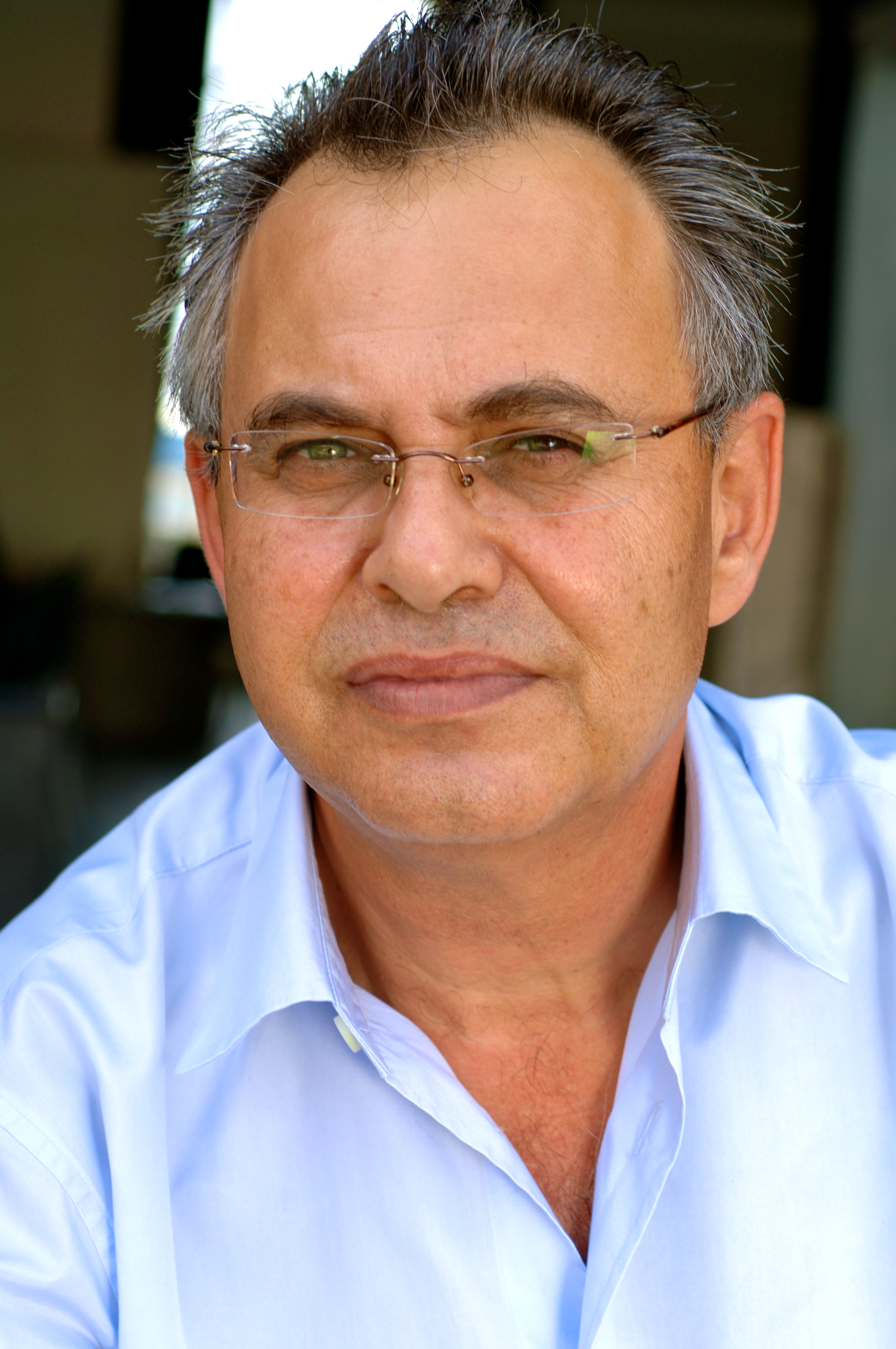
Comverse co-founder and CEO Jacob "Kobi" Alexander

Under his lead, Alexander was credited with turning around Comverse's fortunes. In 1989, the Ascom Group made a $6 million direct investment in the company. In 1990, Comverse won a potentially $10 million contract, its largest yet, to deliver computers running voicemail and fax applications on West German cellular networks, beating out far larger corporations in the process. Deutsche Telekom became one of the company's biggest early customers. By 1991, the company had annual sales of $17 million and was selling a combined voice and fax mailbox system. Many of its early successes came from avoiding the huge telecommunications companies in the U.S. and instead focusing on selling to small- and medium-sized companies in the wireless market in Europe. The company also sought a variety of other markets, including developing countries such as Mexico and China for its Trilogue virtual telephone service. Gradually its product emphasis shifted more from hardware to software.

While headquartered in the U.S., nearly all its manufacturing was done in Israel, where it was able to substantially benefit from government subsidies and tax credits provided to research and development for hi-tech firms and industries by the Office of the Chief Scientist in the Ministry of Trade and Industry and by the Israel-U.S. Binational Industrial Research and Development Foundation. Many other Israeli companies were built by the same model, including another top software company, Mercury Interactive. During the 1990s, Comverse received at least 69 research and development grants from the OCS program.

In 1993, the company reported a 341 percent rise in profits on revenues in the $64 million range and was named a "Company to Watch" by Fortune magazine. However its stock plunged for a while in 1994 after a disappointing earnings report.

By 1995, Comverse was best known for its AudioDisk product, which was sold to overseas clients and allowed legal authorities and intelligence agencies to record and store data collected from wiretaps. Half the company's revenues at that point were from AudioDisk, and market analysts were recommending Comverse's stock.

=== Growth with wireless ===
Comverse became a market leader in voice messaging software and boomed during the late 1990s with the surge in mobile phone use. Much of its market focus was on wireless operators and overseas companies, and it gained a formidable position in the worldwide mobile voicemail management market. The growth coincided with SMS text messages becoming popular; the first big application for SMS was as a notification mechanism to tell a wireless subscriber that voicemail were stored in a voicemail box. Comverse expanded this application into a full-blown short message service center (SMSC), which receives, buffers, processes, and dispatches all SMS messages throughout a mobile network. Comverse branded and productised this as the Intelligent Short Message Service Center, or ISMSC. Typical of telecomm software, it ran on Unix-based platforms, such as UnixWare and later Linux. Comverse's ISMSC found success as a lower-price solution for lower-traffic networks, where it competed with Logica's Telepath solution. Other companies in the SMSC space included CMG and Openwave. ISMSC found considerable market penetration, exemplified by all six of Hong Kong's wireless carriers using it.

Comverse also became a participant in forming international wireless standards, such as in 2001 for the Speech Application Language Tags (SALT) markup language for XML to add voice capabilities to web-based applications. Additional industry standards groups in which Comverse has been active include the Open Mobile Alliance and TM Forum.

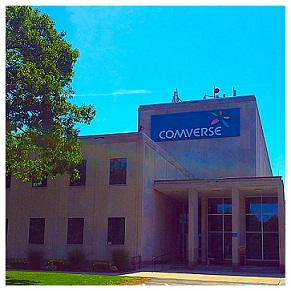
The Comverse Network Systems subsidiary's headquarters building was in Wakefield, Massachusetts in the U.S.

In addition to growing organically, Comverse Technology began acquiring other companies in both Israel and the U.S. It acquired Dale, Gesek, McWilliams, & Sheridan, later known as DGM&S Telecom, in 1996 and renamed it Ulticom in 1999. Comverse Technology acquired one of its key rivals, Boston Technology, for $843 million in stock in 1997. The acquisition gave Comverse entree into the large U.S. telecommunications market and meant Comverse would be supplying voice messaging systems to 12 of the world's top 20 carriers, and left it the third-largest supplier after Lucent and Northern Telecom. In 1999, as it saw record earnings, Comverse formed two wholly owned subsidiaries, Comverse Network Systems and Comverse Infosys, representing the telecommunications services platforms and products and the digital monitoring and recording products, respectively. By 2000, its revenues were $1.2 billion and it had global operations. It continued to aggressively acquire small companies to fill out its technologies, as exemplified by the purchase of Loronix, Gaya Software, and Exalink, all within a 30-day period in 2000. The company's stock price rose from around $10 in late 1998 to over $120 in early 2001. The company was able to raise money several times on Nasdaq, including once for its Ulticom subsidiary and once (at a valuation of $600 million) shortly before the Dot-com bubble burst.

Comverse was one of the most prominent success stories in Israel's hi-tech industry, with both Haaretz and The Jerusalem Post referring to it as a flagship of that industry. As CEO, Alexander was sought out for meetings in Tel Aviv by world leaders such as Chinese President Jiang Zemin. He became known, as Bloomberg News later stated, as "the wizard of Israel's technology boom"; his oft-stated goal was for Comverse to do for Israel what Nokia had done for Finland. Comverse was one of the largest employers of software engineers in Israel and its stock was widely held among the Israeli investing public; as a consequence, the successes and failures of Comverse were always followed closely in the country's financial press. (Amdocs and Mercury Interactive were two other prominent Israeli companies in the enterprise software sector that were also closely followed.)

The company was also quintessentially Israeli in how it was run, with Comverse CEO Ze'ev Bregman in particular favoring a loose, relaxed system in which he knew all the employees and lines of management reporting were frequently bypassed. When Comverse Technology joined the S&P 500 index in 1999, it was the first Israeli-associated company ever to do so. It set the same mark when it joined the NASDAQ-100 index.

The early 2000s recession led to some struggles for Comverse Technology, with the global economic downturn leading to publicly announced profit warnings and a plunge in the stock price in July 2001. Over 3,000 jobs were cut during the period as part of several restructuring efforts. The company still made some acquisitions, such as buying the instant messaging specialist Odigo for $20 million in 2002, after having previously purchased a 12 percent stake in it in 2001. The image of Comverse Technology as Israel's blue-chip hi-tech stock suffered, and led to a slide in several other large Israeli technology firms. Comverse's management was criticized by analysts for having issued over-optimistic forecasts, although many other Israeli firms in the industry did even worse or failed completely during this period. In addition, the European market for mobile voicemail management was already saturated by 2002 and the prepaid wireless market was in decline. In 2002, Comverse Infosys changed its name to Verint, partly to separate its more thriving business from Comverse's struggles, and staged a modestly successful IPO of a minority portion of its stock. By 2002, Comverse Technology had more than 5,000 employees across nearly 40 countries; due to the partial spinoffs and economic difficulties, revenues were down to $735 million.

In December 2001, Fox News reported that wiretapping equipment provided by Comverse Infosys to the U.S. government for electronic eavesdropping may have been vulnerable, as these systems allegedly had a back door through which the wiretaps could be intercepted by unauthorized parties. Fox News reporter Carl Cameron said there was no reason to believe the Israeli government was implicated, but that "a classified top-secret investigation is underway". A March 2002 story by Le Monde recapped the Fox report and concluded: "Comverse is suspected of having introduced into its systems of the 'catch gates' in order to 'intercept, record and store' these wire-taps. This hardware would render the 'listener' himself 'listened to'." Fox News did not pursue the allegations, and in the years since, there have been no legal or commercial actions of any type taken against Comverse by the FBI or any other branch of the US Government related to data access and security issues. While no real evidence has been presented against Comverse or Verint, the allegations have become a favorite topic of conspiracy theorists.

By 2005, the company had $959 million in sales and employed over 5,000 people, of whom about half were located in Israel. That country held most of the research and development workers, many of whom occupied the company's seven buildings on HaBarzel in the Ramat HaHayal district of Tel Aviv, while business and marketing operations were stationed in the company's Woodbury, New York headquarters.

=== Options backdating scandal ===
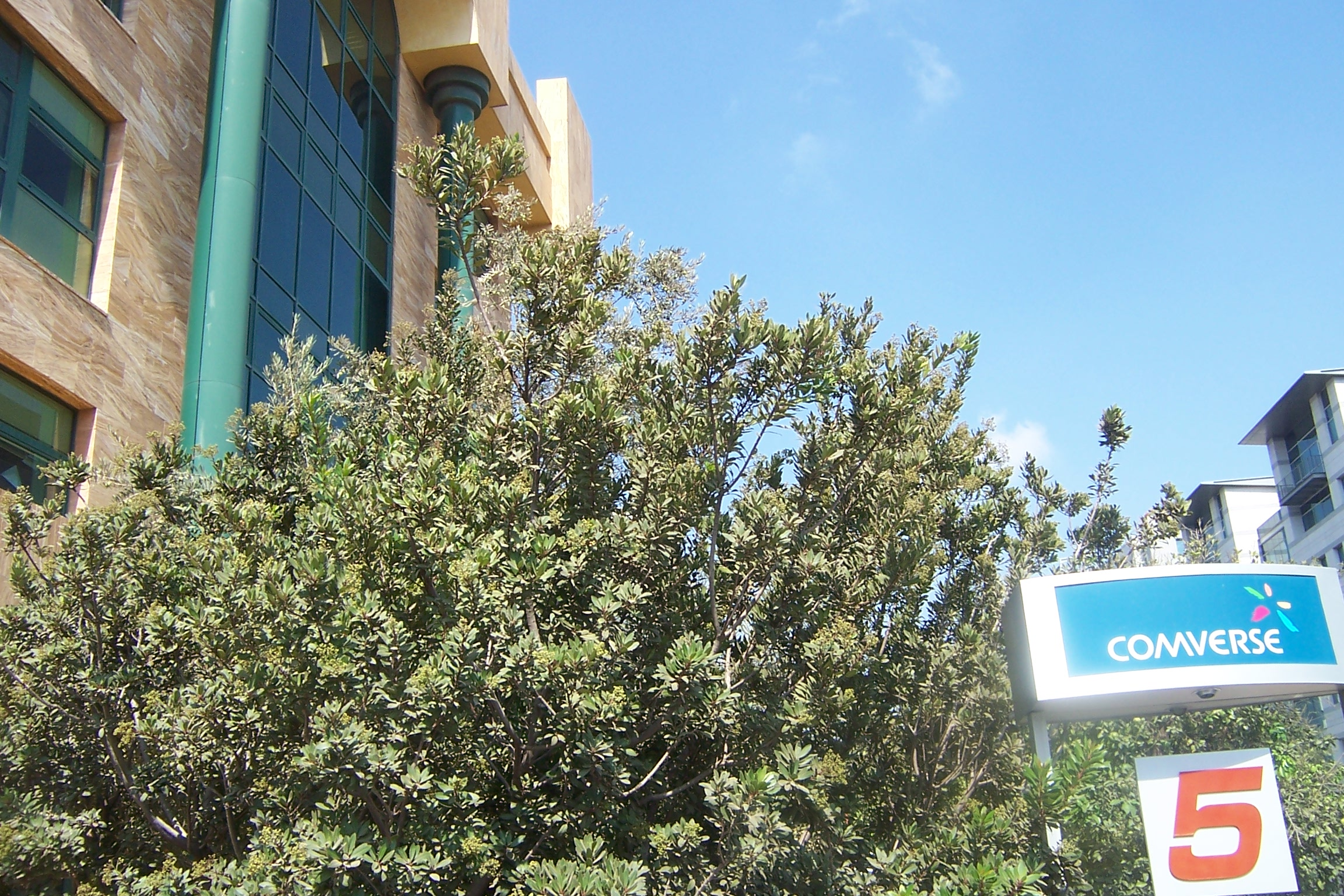
Another view of a Comverse building in Tel Aviv, from 2006

In 2006, Comverse Technology was involved in an options backdating scandal. In May of that year, company founder and CEO Jacob Alexander stepped down from his position. Alexander, finance chief David Kreinberg, and former senior general counsel William Sorin (both of whom had also stepped down) were charged in July 2006 in the United States District Court for the Eastern District of New York with multiple counts of conspiracy, fraud, money laundering and making false filings to the Securities and Exchange Commission (SEC), all related to alleged options backdating or other actions related to stock options between 1998 and 2006. The accusations against the three included the backdating of options to when Comverse stock had been trading at low prices, the use of fake names of option holders, and the creation of secret funds in which to hold the illicit gains. The SEC also filed civil charges against the three, for filing false annual and quarterly financial reports and proxy statements from 1991 to 2005.

By then, Alexander had fled the country and was classified a wanted fugitive in August 2006 by the US Federal Bureau of Investigation. On 27 September 2006, he was arrested in Namibia after hiding in Windhoek with his family, where he had bought a house at a country club. If extradited to the US and convicted, he faced 25 years in prison.

He was released on bail and engaged in a long battle to avoid extradition to the US (in Namibia neither money laundering nor options backdating is a crime). Upon leaving the US he had transferred some $64 million to Israel, with most of that ending up in Namibia; another $50 million was blocked by the US government, which overall sought the forfeiture of $138 million of Alexander's assets. In April 2010, Alexander won a victory in the Supreme Court of Namibia that allowed him to continue to live and work there until the extradition request was ruled upon. In November 2010, Alexander agreed to pay the U.S. government $53.6 million to settle the SEC's case against him, with those monies being targeted to settle assorted lawsuits against Comverse by shareholders.

Of the other two executives, William Sorin pleaded guilty to criminal charges and was sentenced to a year in prison in 2007. David Kreinberg cooperated with prosecutors, repaid $2.4 million to the SEC, and in 2011 was sentenced to the "time served" of the minimal period he had originally been in custody. While over a hundred companies were investigated or charged with options backdating, Comverse was one of the most visible and was labeled by a pair of financial writers a "poster child for stock option fraud."

=== Continuing difficulties ===
Recovery from the scandal was difficult. The three charged executives, who had stayed on as consultants, were fired without severance pay, and the company said it would pursue legal action against them. The board of directors was expanded from five to ten, with all new ones being Americans rather than Israelis. A new CEO, Andre Dahan, came on board in April 2007 but the ongoing management crisis prevented the company from engaging in new innovation or entering new business areas. Despite the 2006-2007 economic climate being one of growth, layoffs occurred in mid-2007. Research analysts began speculating that the company might break up.

Because of the accounting issues from the option backdating, Comverse Technology was unable to file full or timely financial reports with the SEC. Its stock was delisted from the Nasdaq Stock Market on 1 February 2007, and removed from the S&P 500 and NASDAQ-100 at the same time. The stock then traded on the Pink Sheets. In 2009, the SEC settled its case with Comverse Technology; the company would not be subject to penalty fines over the backdating matter, but would accept a permanent injunction against itself regarding any future violations of law regarding publicly traded companies. A settlement in a similar case against Ulticom was also reached. The failure to file timely financial reports put the company at risk of having its stock registration revoked; a process deciding this, involving the SEC and an Administrative Law Judge, was still active of 2011.

The 2008 financial crisis caused further difficulties for Comverse Technology, with new layoffs occurring in October 2008, March 2009, and August 2009. The company reportedly lost considerable money in 2009, and the moves were typical of other hi-tech companies caught in the bad economic environment. Some of Comverse's products were still viewed highly; a Yankee Group survey ranked them first in the world in their type of billing services, and they were the worldwide market-share leaders in providing multimedia message service centers to wireless carriers. However, the rise in popularity of smartphones and of sending e-mail eroded the carrier market for some of Comverse's products and services. By 2009, the company's upper management was now largely American rather than Israeli, Dahan was under internal criticism, and there were frequent clashes regarding company culture.

In early 2010, Comverse Technology planned to release an annual report with full financial statements and return to being fully listed on Nasdaq, but anticipated more layoffs. One piece of positive news in July 2010 was an $80 million investment by well-known entrepreneur George Soros. However, the financial reports were not published and a public announcement was made in August 2010 that the company was short on cash and planning more layoffs. A precipitous drop of the stock price caused the market valuation of the company to fall below $1 billion, and the continued failure to file financial reports put the company at risk of having its stock being delisted completely. CEO Dahan said simply, "These are challenging times." By August 2010, analysts were stating that Comverse Technology might have to break up by selling off its subsidiaries and spin off Comverse's own business units. Running low on cash, Comverse Technology engaged Goldman Sachs to explore such possibilities, with several large, well-known technology companies potentially interested in Comverse and some private equity firms possibly interested in Verint. The company had some 4,000 employees, and continued having about half of them employed in Israel and most of the rest in the US and France. The continuing financial reporting problems had cost the company some $500 million in accountants' fees and related costs since 2006 and was the largest drain on its cash position. The fact that senior management awarded itself bonuses in a time of various rounds of layoffs left employees feeling outraged. Comverse's restructuring also affected its 2006-acquired NetCentrex business unit in France, with layoffs or a shutdown possible. In October 2010, Comverse Technology agreed to sell its two-thirds ownership of its Ulticom subsidiary to a U.S. private equity firm for $90 million; the deal closed in December 2010. The company also sold part of its holdings in Verint, netting $80 million, and sold for $27 million land in the hi-tech area of Ra'anana, north of Tel Aviv, where it had been planning to build a new headquarters.

In October 2010, Comverse Technology finally published its restated financial reports for fiscal years 2005 through 2008. (The company's fiscal year N ran from February of year N to January of N+1.) They revealed that the company lost about $1 billion during that period. In February 2011, the company announced that due to this effort, its report for fiscal 2009 would be delayed, and also that it was restructuring into four independent business units and focusing much of its emphasis on billing systems for mobile carriers. Layoffs also resumed, with more possibly in the offing.

In March 2011, revenues for fiscal 2009 were announced at $1.58 billion, down from $1.72 billion two years previously, with an overall loss of $273.3 million. Dahan stepped down as CEO. During his tenure, Comverse Technology stock fell 68 percent in price and 2,000–2,500 employees were laid off; he made more than $20 million during that time and gained payments of some $5 million upon his departure. Overall, his stint as leader of the company was not regarded positively by some in the Israeli business press.

The new CEO was Charles Burdick, who had been non-executive chairman of the company. Burdick became the first American to head the company.

In April 2011, the company agreed to a $2.8 million settlement with the U.S. government over violations of the Foreign Corrupt Practices Act that had taken place between 2003 and 2005. Payments of $536,000 had been made to the Hellenic Telecommunications Organization in order to obtain purchase orders and had been inaccurately reported as sales commissions in Comverse's accounting.

=== Hopes for recovery ===
During the first half of 2011, analysts such as Oppenheimer & Co., J.P. Morgan and Barclays said that with its accounting problems largely behind it, some restructuring done, and an improving cash balance and some revenue growth, Comverse Technology was well-positioned for ongoing operations or a possible sale. Zacks Investment Research predicted the company would again show a profit for fiscal year 2011. Comverse itself had gained tens of millions in new business, was hiring again in modest numbers, and was at about 4,000 employees, including some on an outsourcing basis.

In June 2011, results for fiscal 2010 were announced, finally bringing the company current with its annual audited reporting. Revenues rose to $1.63 billion while the company's net loss was halved to $132.3 million, and the cash position was now stated as being sufficient to meet foreseeable needs. Another positive sign for its recovery came when it was re-listed on NASDAQ in September 2011. In April 2012, results for fiscal 2011 were announced; revenues remained flat at $1.59 billion while the company's net loss decreased again, to $58.7 million.

=== Restructuring ===
In August 2012, a series of transactions were announced that would end Comverse Technology as a functioning entity, by making Comverse Network Systems an independent company once again known simply as Comverse, allowing Verint Systems to buy back Comverse Technology's majority stake, and selling off the other subsidiaries. Burdick said, "[The Verint] agreement, along with the planned spin-off of [Comverse Network Systems], will result in a tax efficient distribution to our shareholders and direct ownership in two independent, well-capitalized publicly-traded companies." Philippe Tartavull was named as the CEO of the newly independent Comverse. Results for fiscal year 2012 for the restructured Comverse, Inc. demonstrated a return to profitability, with a net income of $5.1 million.

These restructuring transactions were completed on 4 February 2013 and represented the effective liquidation of the Comverse Technology holding entity.

Further actions followed the end of Comverse Technology. During June 2015 Comverse divested its BSS business to Amdocs. In September 2015 after a merger this new Comverse entity changed its name to Xura, then after a further series of acquisitions and mergers in February 2017 it became part of Mavenir.

== Industry recognition ==
Over the years, Comverse Technology won a number of awards within its industry, including:

- 2002 – Technology Marketing Corporation's Product of the Year (for Verint's Ultra IntelliMiner)
- 2004 – CMP Media's Product of the Year (for Verint's Ultra Intelligent Recording)
- 2004 – CDMA Development Group's Innovative Solutions Award (for Comverse's Multimedia Messaging Service Center)
- 2005, 2006, 2007, 2008, 2009 – Frost and Sullivan's Telecom BSS Vendor of the Year award (for Comverse's business support systems in the Asia Pacific region)
- 2007 – International Engineering Consortium's Best VoIP Product or Service Award (for Comverse's Converged IPCentrex solution)
- 2007 – Technology Marketing Corporation's IMS Leadership Award (for Comverse's Converged Messaging Solution)
- 2007 – International Engineering Consortium's InfoVision Awards for Best New Product (for Comverse's Converged Billing Suite)
- 2007 – Technology Marketing Corporation's Internet Telephony Excellence Award (for Comverse's MyCall Converged Communications product)
- 2009, 2010 – Technology Marketing Corporation's Internet Telephony BSS/OSS Excellence Award (for Comverse's ONE Billing & Active Customer Management package)
- 2010 – Virgo Publishing's Excellence Award for Best Cost Management Implementation (for Comverse's Business Support System product)

== Bibliography ==
- Breznitz, Dan (2007). Innovation and the State: Political Choice and Strategies for Growth in Israel, Taiwan, and Ireland (Revised ed.). New Haven: Yale University Press. ISBN 978-0-300-12018-9.
- Commander, Simon (2005). The Software Industry in Emerging Markets. Cheltenham: Edward Elgar Publishing. ISBN 1-84542-247-3.
- Longueuil, Donald (2003). Wireless Messaging Demystified. New York: McGraw-Hill Professional. ISBN 0-07-138629-7.
- Sarna, David E. Y.; Malik, Andrew (2010). History of Greed: Financial Fraud from Tulip Mania to Bernie Madoff. John Wiley and Sons. ISBN 978-0-470-60180-8.
