= Michael Horvath =

American entrepreneur, co-founder of Strava

- Born: United States
- Education: Harvard University (AB), Northwestern University (PhD)
- Occupations: entrepreneur and former academic
- Known for: co-founder and former CEO of Strava and Kana Software
- Notable work: assistant professor, Stanford University and Dartmouth College

Michael Horvath is an American entrepreneur and former academic. He is the co-founder and former CEO of Strava, a fitness tracking and social networking platform, and Kana Software, an enterprise software company.

== Early life and education ==
Horvath attended Harvard University, where he was captain of the lightweight rowing crew, graduating in 1988 with an AB in economics. He subsequently earned a PhD in economics from Northwestern University.

== Academic career ==
From 1994 to 2000, Horvath served as an assistant professor of economics at Stanford University. He then joined the Tuck School of Business at Dartmouth College as an assistant professor from 2000 to 2004. Concurrently, from 2001 to 2005, he served as CFO and vice president of operations at GlycoFi, a biotechnology company.

== Career ==
In 1996, Horvath co-founded Kana Communications with Mark Gainey, an enterprise email management software company, serving as its CFO until 1998.

In 2009, Horvath co-founded Strava alongside Gainey, Davis Kitchel, Chris Donahue, Mark Shaw, and Pelle Sommansson. He served as CEO from 2009 until 2013, when he stepped down for personal reasons, with Gainey resuming the role. Horvath returned as CEO in November 2019. In February 2023, he announced his resignation for a second time. In December 2023, Michael Martin, a former executive at YouTube, was appointed as the new CEO. Following his departure from Strava, Horvath co-founded Nyfik, a software company, in 2024.
