= Kobi Alexander =

Israeli-American businessman

- קובי אלכסנדר
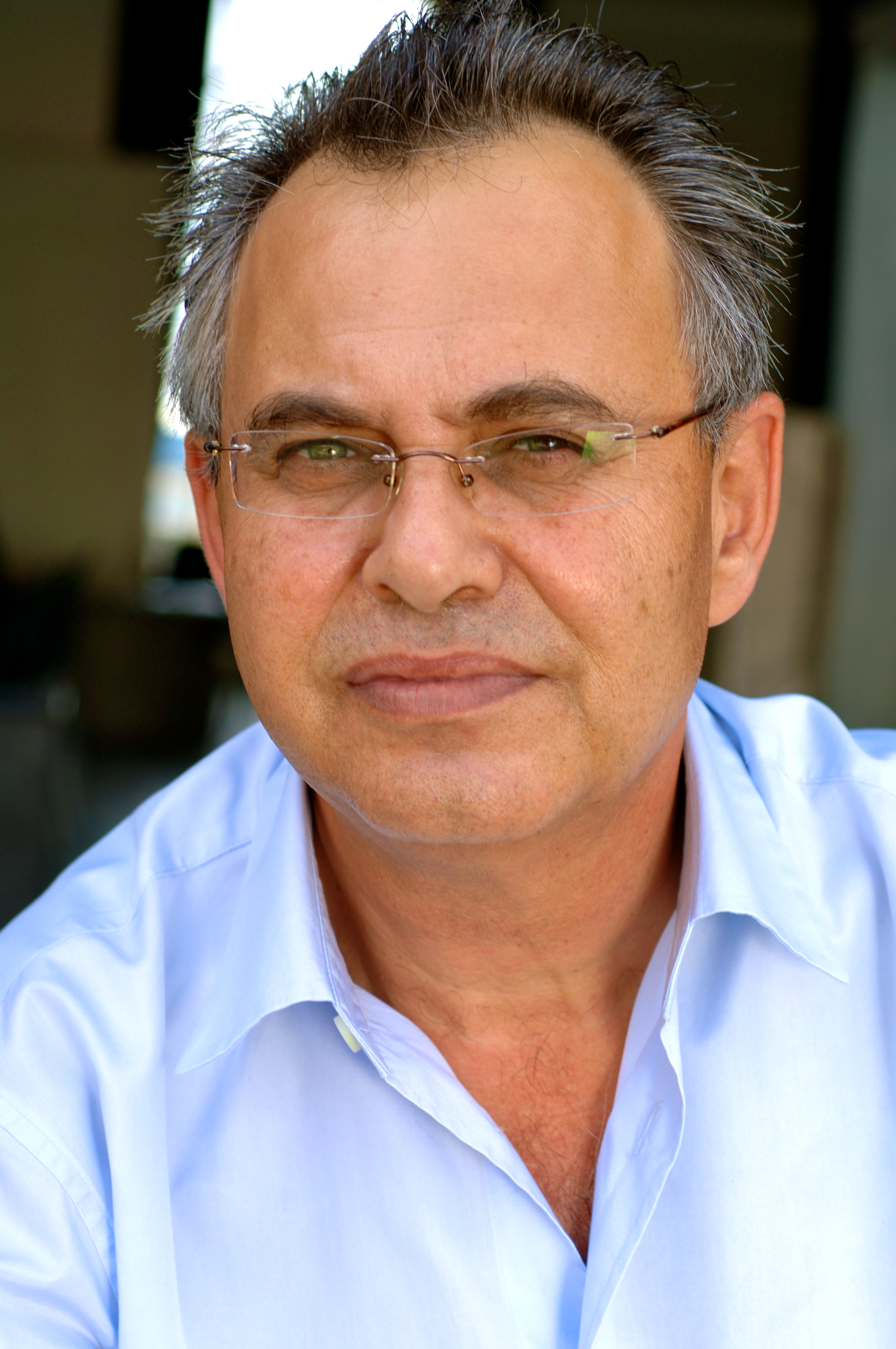
- Born: Jacob Alexander; May 4, 1952 (age 74); Kfar Saba, Israel
- Known for: Founder of Comverse Technology

Jacob "Kobi" Alexander (Hebrew: יעקב (קובי) אלכסנדר; born May 4, 1952) is an Israeli-American businessman. He is the founder and the former CEO of New York-based Comverse Technology. In 2006, he was charged with multiple counts of fraud and related offenses pertaining to irregularities in trading of Comverse stock; he subsequently fled to Namibia, a nation which has no extradition treaty with the US.

== Education ==
Alexander earned degrees in economics from Hebrew University in Jerusalem and finance from New York University.

== Career ==
A major breakthrough came when Alexander convinced Swiss telecom giant Ascom to invest US$6 million in the company in the mid 1980s, providing Comverse the capital it needed at that time. In 1986, Alexander was able to take Comverse public on the NASDAQ.

Alexander also formerly owned 25% of the Israeli basketball team Maccabi Tel Aviv B.C.

== Awards and accomplishments ==
In addition to Comverse Technology, Alexander spun off and took public several other companies including Ulticom (NASDAQ: ULCM) and Verint Systems (NASDAQ: VRNT). Companies under his leadership were listed in Barron's 500, Business Week: "Hot Growth Companies", "Business Week 50", Business Week: "The Information Technology 100", Financial World: "America's Best 100 Growth Companies", Fortune: "100 Fastest Growing Companies"', International Business: "100 Fastest-Growing International Companies", Wall Street Journal: "10-Year Best Performers", and Wall Street Journal "Honor Roll", among others. In 2006, Comverse was named one of the "Institutional Investor: America's Most Shareholder-Friendly Companies". "As CEO of Comverse, Alexander was sought out by the likes of former Chinese President Jiang Zemin, who slipped away from official meetings in 2000 and steered his motorcade through a pot-holed section of Tel Aviv to meet with him." He served as the chairman of the board and chief executive officer of CTI from 1987 to May 1, 2006, when he resigned during an investigation being conducted by a Special Committee of CTI's board of directors into the timing of CTI's stock option grants. He was chairman of several CTI subsidiaries, including Verint Systems and Ulticom.

== Criminal charges ==
On July 31, 2006, Alexander was charged by United States Department of Justice authorities with multiple charges of conspiracy to commit various types of fraud (including securities fraud, wire fraud and mail fraud), as well as with related offences, all relating to the timing of Comverse's stock option grants.:

After Alexander left the United States on June 21, 2006, on a pre-planned annual vacation in Israel, his lawyers arranged with American authorities that he would return to face indictment on July 30, 2006; however, he instead traveled to Germany. On July 31 a warrant was issued for his arrest.

On August 9, 2006, the United States Securities and Exchange Commission filed a civil injunctive action in the United States District Court for the Eastern District of New York against Alexander, along with alleged co-conspirators William F. Sorin, Comverse's former Senior General Counsel, and David Kreinberg, Comverse's former chief financial officer. The complaint makes nine claims of violation of the Securities Act and the Exchange Act, including fraud (First and Second Claims), and falsification of books, records or accounts (Fourth Claim). Through this action, the Commission is seeking permanent injunctive relief, disgorgement of ill-gotten gains, civil damages, and a prohibition against any of the defendants becoming officers of a securities-issuing entity under SEC jurisdiction.

Alexander transferred over 40 million dollars from his personal U.S. bank account to his personal bank account in Israel. He was arrested by Interpol in Windhoek, Namibia on September 27, 2006. He was released on bail on October 3, 2006. According to a Reuters report of April 23, 2007, the Namibian government described Alexander as "very passionate" about the country and its people; Alexander has promised to boost academic interest in science and technology in Namibia by establishing an annual scholarship for primary and secondary level students. He has also begun to introduce advanced technology to the country with his development of a low budget solar powered housing project for 100 low-income Namibian families.

Despite fighting extradition to the United States, Alexander announced on January 28, 2008, that he has filed suit against Comverse. Alexander claims the firm owes him $72 million in severance, unexercised stock options, and bonus pay.

On July 3, 2008, a Namibian court split decisions for and against Alexander granting his request to remove the judge currently assigned to preside at his extradition hearing while declining to assign a magistrate of his choosing. Additionally, the Namibian High Court did not, at Alexander's attorneys' request, rule unconstitutional the Extradition Act which would allow Alexander to be imprisoned at some point during the upcoming extradition hearing. As reported by Bloomberg.com on November 19, 2008, a hearing to request Alexander's extradition to the United States was postponed until March 4, 2009, pending Alexander's appeal to Namibia's Supreme Court regarding which judge should hear the case. This appeal, not yet scheduled, will likely be adjudicated in March or April 2009. The final outcome of the extradition proceedings can be several years away pending the appeals process. Despite impending extradition proceedings, Alexander has invested heavily within the country.

In 2011, Alexander settled the civil charges with the SEC and gave up bank accounts worth $46 million to federal authorities.

On August 22, 2016, it was reported by Scott Cohn on CNBC that Alexander would return to the US to face criminal charges. On February 23, 2017, Judge Nicholas Garaufis of the Eastern District of New York sentenced Alexander to 30 months in prison. On March 1, 2018, Alexander was transferred to Israel to carry out his remaining sentence. Later in 2018 he was released from prison.
