= Cognyte =

Israeli software company

Cognyte Software Limited
- Traded as: Nasdaq: CGNT
- Founded: 2021; 5 years ago
- Revenue: ▲US$400 million (2025)
- Net income: ▲ −US$0.64 million (2025)
- Website: cognyte.com

Cognyte Software Limited is an Israeli company specialized in lawful interception software.

== History ==
The company started in 2021 after it was spun off from Verint Systems. It is based in Herzliya, Israel.

In 2021, the company exposed 5 billion records of data, which contained data from previous data breaches.

== Products ==
Cognyte is the maker of FalcoNet, a type of IMSI-catcher or cell site simulator used for cellphone surveillance, similar to a Stingray.

== Customers ==
Cognyte has customers in more than 100 countries, including Israel and the United States.

In July 2026, Forbes reported that the Texas Department of Public Safety spent $4.5 million to equip four 2026 Chevy Tahoe SUVs with FalcoNet mobile cellphone surveillance equipment. Cognyte has also sold surveillance technology to the Albuquerque Police Department, the New York State Police, the Florida Department of Law Enforcement, and the US Department of War.

== Surveillance controversies ==
=== Sale of intercept technology to Myanmar ===
In January 2023, Reuters reported, citing documents it had reviewed, that Cognyte had won a tender to supply intercept spyware to Myanma Posts and Telecommunications (MPT), a state-owned telecommunications operator, about a month before the Myanmar military seized power in the February 2021 coup. The documents – a January 2021 letter from MPT to local regulators, passed to Reuters and to the lawyer Eitay Mack by the activist group Justice For Myanmar – named Cognyte as the winning vendor and indicated that the purchase order had been issued by the end of December 2020. The equipment was described as a fixed-data lawful interception gateway, with work reportedly scheduled for completion by mid-2021. Such systems allow authorities to monitor calls, text messages and internet traffic and to locate users without the cooperation of telecommunications and internet providers.

The reported deal was concluded despite Israel's repeated public statements that it had ended defence exports to Myanmar following a 2017 Israeli Supreme Court ruling, the contents of which were placed under a court-ordered gag. Under Israeli law, "dual-use" interception technology is treated as defence equipment, and its export and marketing require government licences. Reuters reported that it could not establish whether Cognyte had obtained such licences or whether the sale had been finalised.

On 2 January 2023, Mack filed a complaint with Israel's attorney general on behalf of more than sixty Israeli citizens, including former Knesset speaker Avraham Burg, seeking a criminal investigation. The complaint accused Cognyte and unnamed defence and foreign ministry officials of aiding and abetting crimes against humanity in Myanmar, and contended that any officials who had granted the company export or marketing licences should also be investigated.

Cognyte, MPT and Myanmar's military government did not respond to requests for comment from Reuters, and Israel's attorney general and its foreign and defence ministries either declined to comment or did not respond. Justice For Myanmar further stated that Cognyte was listed as a partner of the Myanmar technology firm Khine Thitsar and that it had identified a payment from Cognyte to that firm in October 2021, several months after the coup, while noting that it could not confirm the purpose of the payment.

=== Other criticism ===
Cognyte had previously drawn scrutiny over its surveillance products.

In December 2021, Meta Platforms removed around 100 accounts it attributed to the company, stating that Cognyte's tools could be used to operate networks of fake accounts across social media; Meta said the targets included journalists and politicians in several countries.

In December 2022, Norway's sovereign wealth fund excluded Cognyte from its portfolio over concerns that its products and services may have contributed to serious human-rights violations.

In 2024, the Brazilian newspaper O Globo reported that the Brazilian Intelligence Agency used Cognyte's FirstMile surveillance technology to spy on the phones of political opponents of former Brazilian president Jair Bolsonaro during the first three years of Bolsonaro's administration.

According to The Irrawaddy and Justice For Myanmar, the company also had a record of supplying interception equipment to governments with poor human-rights reputations, including South Sudan. Cognyte did not publicly respond to the allegations at the time of the reports.
