= Strava =

American fitness tracking app

- An activity shown on the Strava website
- Developers: Strava, Inc
- Release: 2009
Stable release
- Android: 324.10 / September 11, 2023; 3 years ago
- iOS: 455.0.0 / March 20, 2026; 6 months ago
- Operating system: Android, iOS 13 or later, Web browser, WatchOS, Wear OS
- Size: 138.8 MB (iOS); 44.85 MB (Android)
- Available in: 24 languages
- List of languages English, French, German, Italian, Portuguese (Portugal), Portuguese (Brazil), Spanish, Spanish (Latin America), Simplified Chinese, Traditional Chinese, Russian, Dutch, Japanese, Indonesian, Czech, Thai, Tagalog, Danish, Malay, Norwegian Bokmal, Polish, Swedish, Turkish, Vietnamese
- Type: Fitness
- License: Proprietary
- Website: strava.com

Strava is an American internet service for tracking physical exercise which incorporates social networking features. It started out tracking mostly outdoor cycling and running activities using Global Positioning System (GPS) data, but now incorporates several dozen other exercise types, including indoor activities. Strava uses a freemium model with some features only available in the paid subscription plan. The service was founded in 2009 by Mark Gainey and Michael Horvath, along with co-founders Davis Kitchel, Chris Donahue, Mark Shaw, and Pelle Sommansson, and is based in San Francisco, California.

== Overview ==
Strava records data for a user's activities, which can then be shared with the user's followers or publicly. If an activity is shared publicly, Strava automatically groups activities that occur at the same time and place (such as taking part in a marathon, sportive or group ride). An activity's recorded information may include a route summary, elevation (net and unidirectional), speed (average and maximum), timing (total and moving time), power, and heart rate. Activities can be recorded using the mobile app or from devices manufactured by third parties such as Garmin, Coros, Google Fit, Suunto, Apple Health, and Wahoo. Activities can also be entered manually via the Strava website and mobile app.

Strava Metro, a program marketed to city planners, uses cycling data from Strava users in supported cities and regions.

== History ==
Strava, which means "strive" in Swedish (although spelled "sträva" in Swedish with an "ä"), was founded in 2009. Co-founders Michael Horvath and Mark Gainey first met in the 1980s as members of Harvard University's rowing crew.

In 2007, the two began developing an athlete-focused social platform, returning to an idea they had first discussed in the mid-1990s. Development accelerated after Horvath met Davis Kitchel, a software developer who had been independently working with GPS cycling data.

Strava launched in 2009. The founding team consisted of Mark Gainey, Michael Horvath, Davis Kitchel, Chris Donahue, Mark Shaw, and Pelle Sommansson. Gainey served as the company's first CEO, with Horvath succeeding him in 2010. The company raised a Series A funding round of $3.5 million in 2011. Horvath stepped down as CEO in 2013; Gainey resumed the role until 2017, when James Quarles succeeded him. Horvath then later returned as CEO in November 2019. According to co-founder Mark Gainey, Strava initially operated as a website accepting uploads from Garmin devices and launched its first mobile app in 2011. The company subsequently operated separate cycling and running apps, including Strava Run, before combining them.

Gainey said that Strava's original free tier allowed five activity uploads per month, with further uploads requiring payment. The company later switched to charging for access to additional features.

By 2017, over 1 billion activities had been uploaded to the service. By 2020, Strava had more than 50 million users, and more than three billion activities had been uploaded. In May 2020, at the height of the COVID-19 pandemic, Strava made significant changes to its user terms. Some features that were previously free will now require a paid subscription, and most new developments going forward will be available only to subscribers.

In March 2022, Strava stopped operating in Russia and Belarus because of the Russian invasion of Ukraine.

In early 2023, Strava significantly raised subscription prices in many markets—some more than doubling. A month earlier, the company laid off approximately 14% of its workforce. The company's last venture capital funding was a $110 million Series F in 2020. In January 2023 Strava also acquired Fatmap, a P101 SGR funded company, focused on building high-resolution 3D maps used for outdoor activities, with a long-term goal to integrate Fatmap's core platform into the Strava platform.

In February 2023, founder and current CEO Michael Horvath announced that he would resign. In December 2023, Strava announced Michael Martin, former executive at YouTube, as the new CEO.

On March 5, 2025, Strava moved into a new headquarters office on four levels of the 181 Fremont tower in San Francisco. In May 2025, Strava acquired the running app Runna and the cycling app Breakaway, increasing its valuation to around $2.2 billion, including its debt.

== Features and tools ==
Strava incorporates social media features that allow users to post their exercises to followers. Alongside a map of their exercise, users can also post pictures and videos. Followers can then comment on posts and give 'kudos' in the form of a like button.

Beacon is a feature that allows Strava users to share their location in real time with anyone they choose and nominate others as a safety contact for their workout. Other premium features include access to custom route-building tools and access to map segment leaderboards.

Strava's segments feature developed from conversations with cyclists about individual climbs, which led the company to develop automatic climb detection and associated leaderboards.Strava maintains a system of leaderboards that show the most frequent runners or riders on a segment, as well as the fastest times by activity type. These fastest segment times (also known as KOMs/QOMs (King/Queen of the Mountain) for cycling segments, or CRs (Course Record) for running segments) have been widely criticized for including times by athletes banned for doping, as well as fake times logged by motorized vehicles and other forms of cheating such as biking on runs. In response, Strava released tools for users to report suspicious activities.

== Strava art ==
Some users of the platform use the GPS mapping feature to create line drawings, known as Strava art, within the broader field of GPS drawing. A Canadian runner created 120 such designs and went viral for it. Images have been made while running, cycling, skating, and travelling by other methods, and records such as "largest GPS drawing by bicycle (team)" have been recognized by Guinness World Records.

== Privacy concerns ==
=== Military breaches ===
In November 2017, Strava published a "Global Heatmap"—a "visualization of two years of trailing data from Strava's global network of athletes." In January 2018, an Australian National University student studying international security discovered that this map had mapped military bases, including known U.S. bases in Syria, and forward operating bases in Afghanistan, and HMNB Clyde—a Royal Navy base that contains the United Kingdom's nuclear arsenal. The findings led to continued scrutiny over privacy issues associated with fitness services and other location-aware applications; Strava's CEO James Quarles stated that the company was "committed to working with military and government officials" on the issue, and would be reviewing its features and simplifying its privacy settings. Although users can now opt out of having their data aggregated on the global heatmap, the original data that contains sensitive information has been archived on GitHub.

In June 2022, FakeReporter identified a separate security flaw that allowed the identification and tracking of security personnel working at military bases in Israel. Distinct from the previous heatmap issue, this vulnerability relied on Strava's segments feature.

In January 2025, an investigation by the French newspaper Le Monde found Strava data from French submariners, with public profiles and their real names, at the Île Longue base for the Triomphant-class submarine nuclear ballistic missile submarines. Patrol timings could be deduced from this. The French Navy commented that it was "not a major risk" and would not "affect the activities" of the base. A similar investigation had already been reported by local newspaper Le Télégramme. Le Monde also located the French aircraft carrier Charles de Gaulle.

=== Civilian breach ===
In June 2023, a report claimed that Strava heat map data could be used to reveal the home addresses of highly active users in remote areas. In August 2023, Strava was used to identify a Raleigh, North Carolina resident as the alleged arsonist who lit a "Trump won" lawn sign on fire.

In July 2024 runners for hire, colloquially known as "Strava jockeys", made headlines in Singapore, performing runs on behalf of clients by accessing their Strava accounts and fulfilling set distance and time goals, charging around 10,000 Indonesian rupiah per kilometer. In response to media inquiries, Strava spokesperson James Foster stated that the use of such services, including the sharing of login credentials, constitutes a violation of Strava's terms of service and could result in a ban from the platform.

In October 2024, an investigation by Le Monde revealed that the fitness-tracking app exposed the movements and locations of world leaders' security teams, including those of French President Emmanuel Macron and U.S. President Joe Biden, raising serious concerns about potential security risks and the need for stricter guidelines on the use of such apps by security personnel. A 2025 report by La Presse found similar breaches for former Canadian prime minister Justin Trudeau.
