= Xura =

American technology company (1997-2017)

Xura, Inc.
- Formerly: Comverse, Inc.
- Company type: Public
- Traded as: Nasdaq: MESG
- Industry: Telecommunications software
- Founded: 1997; 29 years ago (subsidiary); 2013; 13 years ago (independent company)
- Defunct: 2017
- Fate: Acquired by Siris Capital Group (2016); Merged into Mavenir (2017)
- Headquarters: Wakefield, Massachusetts, United States
- Key people: Philippe Tartavull (president and CEO)
- Products: Digital Communications Services, Converged Communications (traditional and IP)
- Revenue: US $678 million (FY 2012)
- Net income: ▲US $5.1 million (FY 2012)
- Number of employees: 3,000 (2015)
- Website: www.xura.com

Xura, Inc. previously known as Comverse, Inc., was a technology company headquartered in Wakefield, Massachusetts, United States, in existence from 2013 to 2017, that offered a portfolio of digital services which enabled global communications across a variety of mobile devices and platforms. Xura marketed and sold to communications service providers (CSPs) and to enterprises.

== History ==
=== Subsidiary of Comverse Technology ===
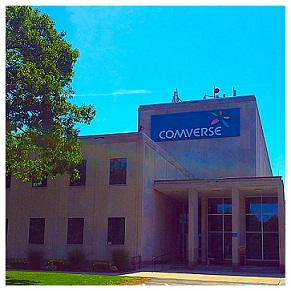
Comverse building in Wakefield, Massachusetts in the U.S. in 2015

For many years, Comverse, also known as Comverse Network Systems, was part of the more widely known Comverse Technology, which had several wholly or partly owned subsidiaries. The name "Comverse" is a portmanteau of the words "communication" and "versatility". As a U.S. subsidiary, Comverse was incorporated on November 19, 1997, as part of the larger Comverse Technology.

In August 2012, a series of transactions were announced that would end Comverse Technology as a functioning entity, by making Comverse Network Systems an independent company once again known simply as Comverse, allowing Verint Systems (the former Comverse Infosys) to buy back Comverse Technology's majority stake in it, and selling off other subsidiaries. Philippe Tartavull was named as the CEO of the independent Comverse.

These transactions were completed by February 4, 2013, and represented the effective liquidation of the Comverse Technology holding entity and the emergence of Comverse, Inc. as a fully independent company.

=== Comverse, Inc. ===
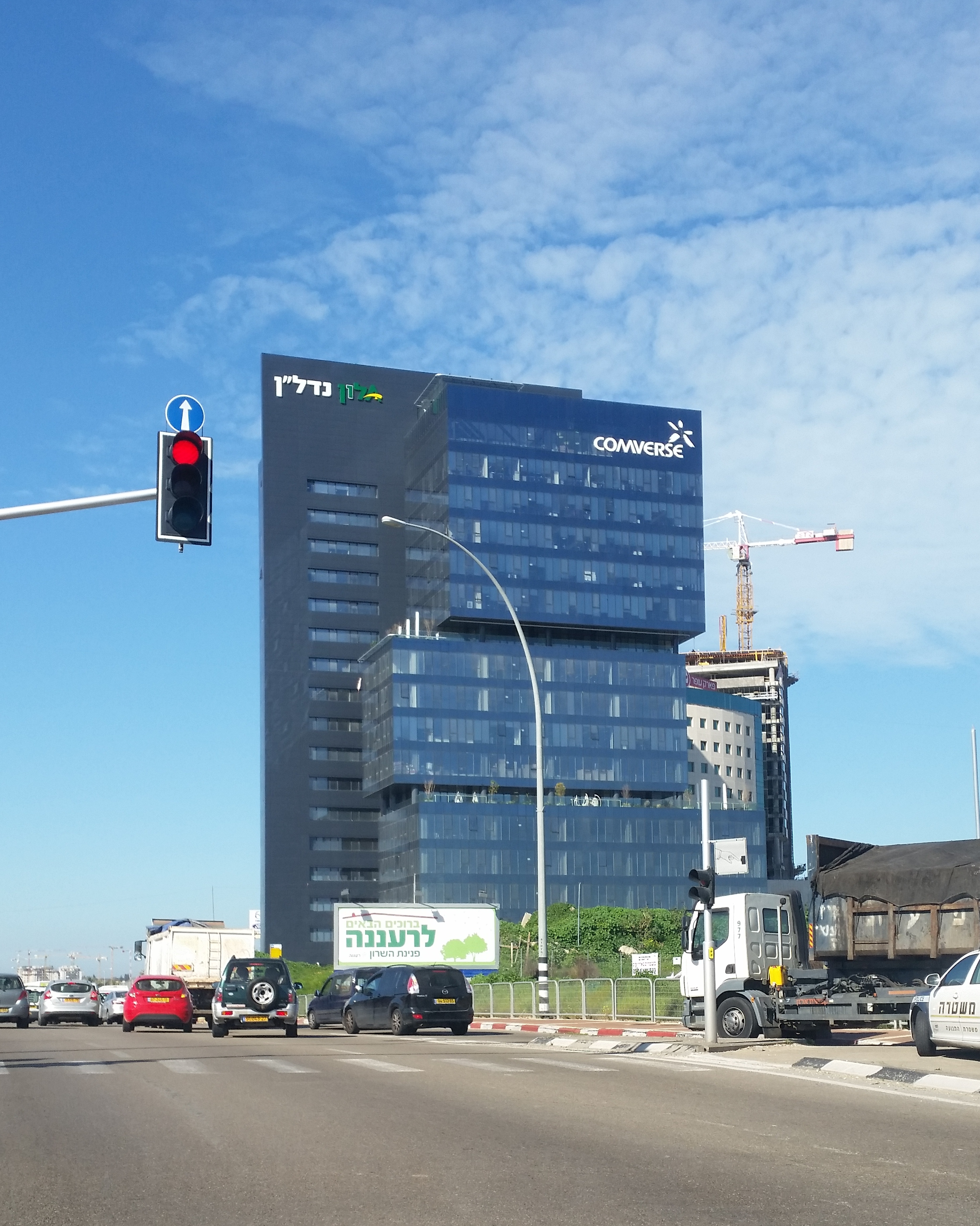
The new Comverse building in Ra'anana, Israel in 2015

Results for fiscal year 2011, which took place as the spin-off of Comverse from Comverse Technology was happening, demonstrated a return to profitability, with a net income of $5.1 million.

In March 2015 Comverse had 3,000 employees, of whom 750 were located in Israel. Company headquarters were located in Wakefield, Massachusetts in the United States.

The company focuses on providing Business Support Systems (BSS), data policy (PCEF, PCRF), traditional and IP-based value-added services to telecommunication and other service providers, complemented by professional and managed services. Comverse's products and solutions included Traditional VAS (TVAS) - Digital Services from the Cloud (mVas), Unified Communications - Cloud Business VoIP & UC, and the Evolved Communication Suite.

During June 2015 Comverse divested its BSS business to Amdocs. In August 2015 Comverse announced it had completed the previously-announced acquisition of Acision, a privately held firm that specialized in secure mobile messaging and engagement services.

=== Xura ===
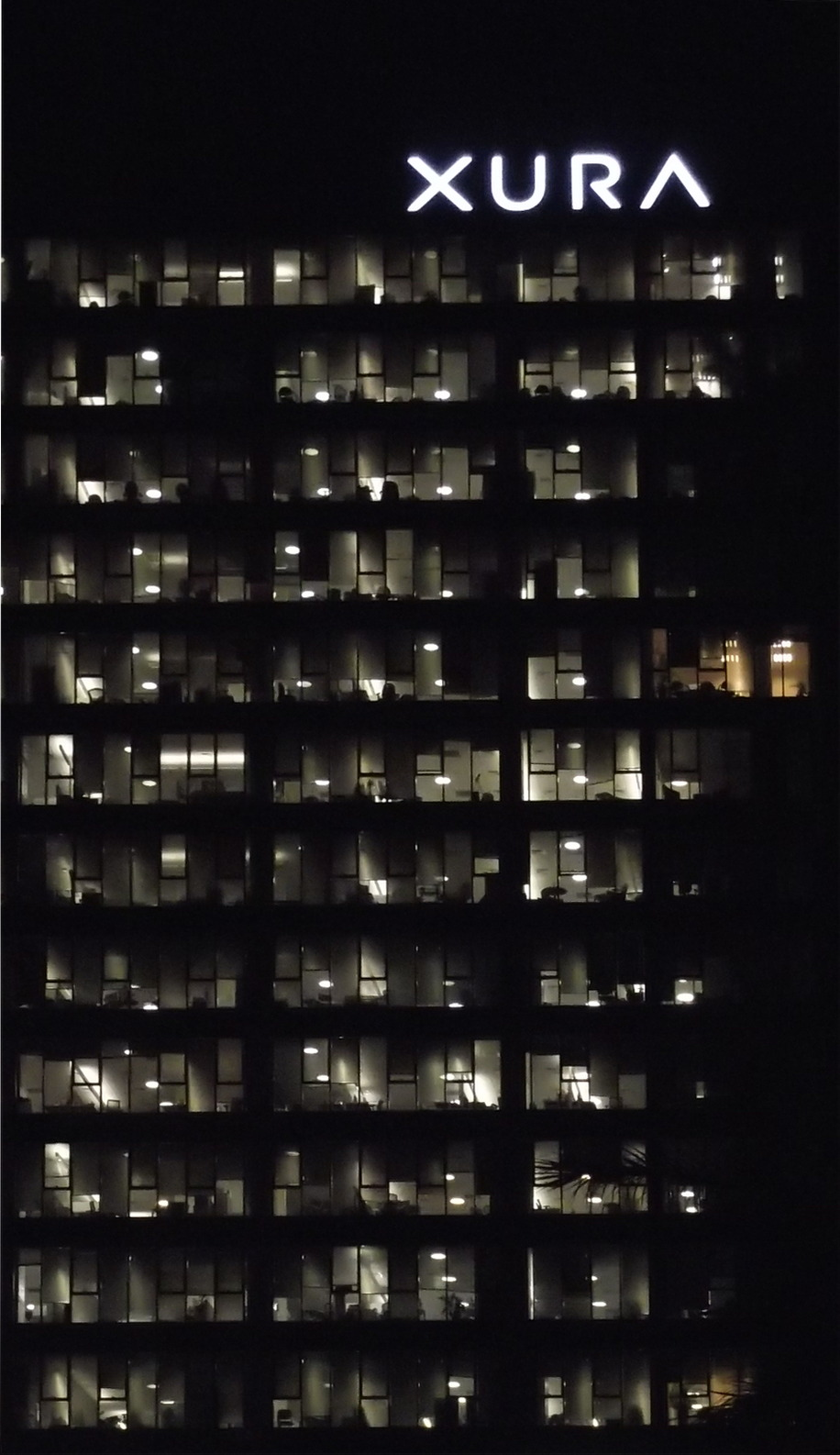
The renamed-to-Xura building in Ra'anana at night in 2017

Following Comverse Inc.'s acquisition of Acision on 6 August 2015, a company name change was made. Xura, Inc. was launched on 9 September 2015, as the new brand of the combined entity. The name 'Xura' was adapted from the word 'Aura'. Xura would also be renaming all Comverse and Acision subsidiaries.

Philippe Tartavull continued as President and CEO of Xura. The company's core products focus was in Digital Communications Services and Converged Communications (traditional and IP). The Xura stock symbol was MESG and it was listed on the NASDAQ exchange.

The goal of Xura was to assist customers to navigate and monetize the digital ecosystem through cloud-based offerings. Its solutions found use in over 350 service providers and enterprises across over 100 countries.

On May 23, 2016, Xura announced an agreement to be acquired by affiliates of Siris Capital Group for $25.00 per share in an all-cash deal valued at approximately $643 million. This transaction was closed on August 19, 2016, when the acquisition completed taking Xura, Inc. from public to privately backed by affiliates of Siris Capital Group, LLC.

The transaction saw Hubert de Pesquidoux, a Siris Capital Executive Partner, take the role as Xura’s new Executive Chairman.

=== Merger to Mavenir ===
On December 19, 2016, affiliates of Xura entered into agreements to acquire Mitel Mobility, a division of Mitel Networks Corporation for $385 million, and Ranzure Networks, Inc., an early-stage venture focused on developing 5G cloud-based radio access network technology, for an undisclosed sum. On February 8, 2017, this deal completed, and Xura was subsumed into a new entity known as Mavenir.

== Products and services ==
Xura's products and solutions belonged to three categories:

- Digital Communications:
  - Xura Communications Suite.
  - Messaging Infrastructure
  - Call Completion
  - Network Signaling Security
  - Messaging Security
- Monetization
  - Low Credit Services
  - Advanced Value Added Services
- Enterprise
  - White-label Communications Application (fuseMe)
  - Secure Communications
  - Rich Web and Mobile Application Development Framework (forge)
