= Amit Bohensky =

Israeli business executive, investor, entrepreneur

- עמית בוהנסקי
- Education: Bar-Ilan University
- Alma mater: Kellogg Recanati
- Occupations: Business executive, investor, entrepreneur
- Years active: 2000–present
- Employer: Verint Systems
- Known for: Founding Unicoders, Focal-Info; Investing in Zoomd
- Board member of: Investor and board member Clinch, Support Machines, IM Online
- Website: Amit Bohensky at LinkedIn

Amit Bohensky (Hebrew: עמית בוהנסקי) is an Israeli business executive and angel investor who works primarily within the software industry. Previously a CEO for companies such as zoomdand Consist Systems and Technologies, he has founded technology startups such as Unicoders and Focal-Info, the latter of which was sold to Verint Systems in 2012. He is currently Verint's vice president of open source web intelligence, as well as a board member and/or investor for companies such as Clinch and Zoomd.com.

== Early life, education ==
Amit Bohensky was born and raised in Israel. From 1996 to 2000 he attended Bar-Ilan University in Ramat Gan, Israel where he earned a BSC in computer science and chemistry. A decade later, he spent 2011 and 2012 in Tel Aviv earning an Executive MBA from Kellogg Recanati.

== Career ==
=== Early years ===
In the early 2000s Bohensky became involved with a number of technology and startup companies in Israel. He was the founder and chief technology officer for Fontik Data and co-founded G-Factor Technology Incubator. From 2000 to 2001 he was the vice president of R&D for Evelon Technologies.

In July 2003 he co-founded the company Unicoders, serving as their CEO until March 2007. Unicoders was sold to the large Israeli IT company Matrix Global in early 2007, and in January of that year Bohensky became Matrix Global's CEO and chief technology officer for Bulgaria and Macedonia. He held those positions until January 2009. A month after leaving Matrix Global he became CEO of the large Israeli IT company Consist Systems and Technologies, where he stayed until January 2012.

=== Verint Systems ===
In July 2008 Bohensky founded Focal-Info, a software company focused on web data extraction and analytics. He stepped away from the company in December 2011, and the following month it was announced that Focal-Info had been bought by the public company Verint for an undisclosed amount, with Bohensky hired back on to lead Focal-Info's "extended activity" within Verint. As of January 2012 Bohensky is Verint's vice president of open source web intelligence.

He has spoken at a number of industry seminars and conventions on behalf of Verint, including the ISS World Europe gathering in 2013, the largest international convention of law enforcement agencies on the topic of data analytics. His talk was titled "The Power of Open Source Web Intelligence." He also spoke at the Money, Privacy, and Power seminar in September 2013 at Kent College of Law-IIT Chicago, giving a talk titled "Beyond Money Laundering."

=== Clinch ===
He joined the software company Clinch in March 2011 as an investor and board member. The Israeli founders of the New York-based startup had recruited both Bohensky and American entrepreneur Jeff Pulver as advisors and investors.

In September 2012 Clinch's social video editor became available in the App Store. According to Next Web, "The main purpose of Clinch is to create enhanced video experiences...its app combines videos, pictures and content from multiple sources, based on location and time...this could become an interesting tool to create collaborative video clips during all sorts of public gatherings."

=== Recent developments ===
He has been on the advisory board for Support Machines since January 2011 and has also served as a director. As of 2013 the automated customer services company has sold product to Israeli carriers Pelephone Communications, Partner Communications, and Cellcom Israel, has a distribution agreement with Amdocs, and has a cooperation agreement with LivePerson. In 2013, he contributed significantly to a $1 million investment raised by the company.

Recently he funded Zoomd.com, a startup that develops ways to organize and group search results.

== Personal life ==
Bohensky lives in Israel with his wife and children.
