= Acision =

Former private British mobile communications company

- Type: Private
- Industry: Mobile communications
- Predecessor: Aldiscon, CMG
- Founded: 2007
- Fate: Acquired by Comverse, Inc. in 2015 (later became Xura, then Mavenir)
- Headquarters: Reading, Berkshire, UK
- Key people: Lawrence Quinn, Founder; Didier Bench, Executive chairman; Adolfo Hernandez, CEO
- Products: Data services; Data control; Data charging
- Revenue: US$0.5 billion
- Number of employees: 1,100 (2013)
- Website: Acision

Acision was a privately held British mobile communications network infrastructure company engaged in messaging and charging systems that enable popular services such as Short message service (SMS), Multimedia Messaging Service (MMS), mobile internet browsing, mobile broadband, and voicemail. In particular, Acision specialised in providing IP messaging to over-the-top media services and other enterprises.

Acision was founded in 2007 as a spin-off of the wireless networks business from LogicaCMG. It existed as an independent, private company until it was purchased by Comverse, Inc. in 2015.

== Background ==
Acision's roots lie in two companies:

1. The Wireless Data Services (WDS) division of Anglo-Dutch consultancy and telecommunications company CMG, the first to develop a Short Message Service Centre (SMSC) in 1992 which was first deployed in 1993. CMG WDS also developed UCP/EMI, a protocol primarily used to connect to short message service centres (SMSCs).
2. The Irish mobile telecommunications pioneers Aldiscon, the first to commercially deploy an SMSC, Telepath, and its now standardized protocol SMPP in 1993.

Aldiscon's first deployment of its Telepath SMSC was with TeliaSonera in Sweden in 1993, followed by Fleet Call (now Nextel) in the US, Telenor in Norway and BT Cellnet (now O2 UK) later in 1993. In 1997, Aldiscon was acquired by UK-based Logica, which merged with CMG in 2002 to form LogicaCMG. Both companies' wireless divisions merged into LogicaCMG Wireless Networks.

== History ==
Acision was born on 20 February 2007, when LogicaCMG Wireless Networks was sold for £265m (US$525m) to private investors Brian Long and Len Blavatnik's Access Industries and became known as Acision. The Times wrote that the new entity was "the world's largest provider of the software, hardware and integration services that form the infrastructure behind SMS text messages". The lead investor at Atlantic Bridge (who became executive chairman at Acision), Laurence Quinn, had been one of the founders of Aldiscon.

As of 2008, Acision had over 300 mobile operators as customers. Acision claimed to serve over a billion end users, and that over 50 per cent of SMS revenue was generated through its platforms. The company employed approximately 1,500 people in 22 countries. Acision was considered one of the industry leaders in providing an MMS delivery platform to content provides, marketing providers, and the like.

In June 2015, it was announced that Acision was being acquired by Comverse, Inc. for a combination of cash and stock values at between $135 and $210 million. Soon after the acquisition, Comverse changed its name to Xura.
