= Mark Gainey =

American entrepreneur, co-founder of Strava

Mark Gainey is an American entrepreneur. He is the founder of Kana Software, an enterprise software company, and Strava, a fitness tracking and social networking platform.

== Early life and education ==
Gainey grew up in Reno, Nevada. He attended Harvard University, where he joined the varsity lightweight rowing crew after a running injury in his freshman year, and graduated in 1990 with an AB in Fine Arts.

== Career ==
After graduating, Gainey worked at TA Associates, a private equity firm in San Francisco, from 1991 to 1995. In 1996, he co-founded Kana Communications with Michael Horvath, an enterprise email management software company. Gainey served as CEO until June 1999, when Kana went public on the NASDAQ. The company reached a peak market capitalization of approximately $10 billion.

In 2009, Gainey co-founded Strava with Michael Horvath, along with the founding team of Davis Kitchel, Chris Donahue, Mark Shaw and Pelle Sommansson. He served as the company's first CEO before passing the role to Horvath in 2010. Gainey resumed the position in 2013, serving until 2017, when he was succeeded by James Quarles. He has since remained with the company as executive chairman.
