= Mavenir Systems, Inc. =

American telecommunications software company

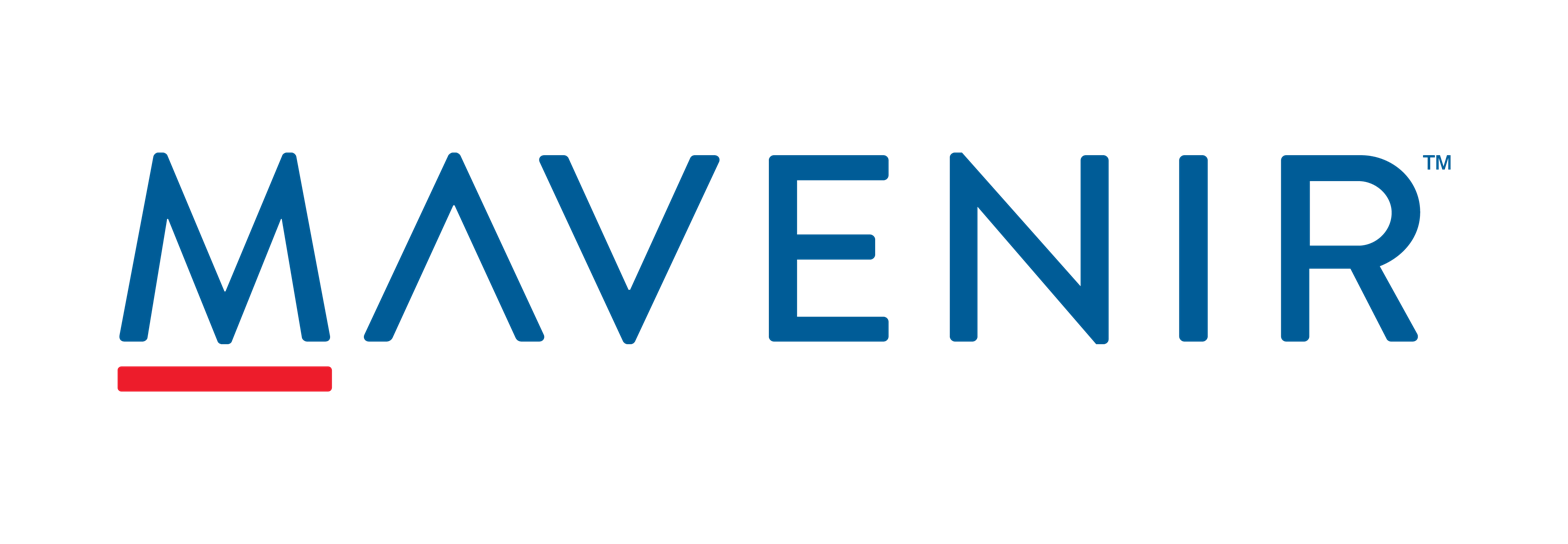
- Company type: Private
- Industry: Telecommunications software
- Predecessors: Comverse, Inc.; Acision; Xura; Mavenir Systems; Airwide Solutions
- Founded: 2017; 9 years ago (main predecessor companies 1997, 2005, and 2007)
- Founder: merger orchestrated by Siris Capital Group, LLC
- Headquarters: Richardson, Texas, U.S.
- Key people: Pardeep Kohli (president and CEO)
- Products: Mobile Core software – including voice & video; multimedia messaging & RCS; IP Multimedia Subsystem (IMS); Packet Core; Mobile Access & Edge software – including OpenRAN vRAN; Multi-access Edge Computing (MEC); Private networks; Mobile Service software – including monetization; unified communications and collaboration; digital engagement; analytics; Multi-ID; Enhanced security
- Revenue: ~$1 billion (2024)
- Number of employees: ~4000 FTE (2024)
- Website: mavenir.com

Mavenir Systems, Inc. is an American telecommunications software company, created in 2017 as a result of a three-way merger of existing companies and technologies, that develops and supplies cloud-native software to the communications service provider (CSP) market.

The company is headquartered in Richardson, Texas, US, and has offices in multiple countries such as India, Pakistan, Indonesia, Romania, Germany, and the UK. Mavenir also has Centres of Excellence around the world, including in Bangalore and Brno.

== History ==
Mavenir Systems was founded in 2005, and completed a $17.5 million round of funding in 2008, another for $13.5 million in 2010, and another for $40 million in 2011. In 2013 Mavenir Systems underwent an IPO and listed on NYSE, raising $44.5 million. In 2015, Mavenir Systems was acquired by Mitel Networks Corporation for $560 million, then rebranded to Mitel Mobile and sold to Xura for $350 million.

In 2016, Pardeeep Kohli and Ashok Khuntia founded Ranzure. Ranzure was acquired by Xura in 2016, before Xura, Ranzure and Mitel Mobile were merged and rebranded as Mavenir in 2017.

Between 2017 and 2020, Mavenir acquired Brocade’s vEPC technology (2017), Aquto (2018), Argyle Data (2018), and, in 2020, ip.access after which the company established an Open RAN Centre of Innovation in Cambridge, UK.

On 6 October 2020, Mavenir announced that it had filed a registration statement for an initial public offering (IPO) of ordinary shares on Nasdaq. Due to market volatility in the run-up to the 2020 US elections the company postponed the IPO on 28 October but stated that it would keep market conditions under review in the following months.

In 2021, Mavenir signed an agreement with Koch Strategic Platforms (KSP) for a minority equity investment of $500m.

Recapitalization

In June 2025, Mavenir and controlling shareholder Siris restructured its finances through a recapitalization deal with lenders, eliminating more than $1.3 billion of debt and securing $300 million in new financing. Later in December 2025, Mavenir confirmed a refocus on mobile core software and AI, exiting the manufacture and distribution of physical radio unit (RU) hardware, and realigning into two integrated business units: packet-core, messaging and security; and voice and radio access technologies.

== Customers & Partnerships ==
=== Open RAN ===
Between 2018 and 2025, Mavenir was heavily involved in Open RAN technology partnerships, and operator trials and deployments, including integrations. In 2020, Mavenir publicly disclosed O-RAN operator partnerships with Deutsche Telekom for web-scale validation of 5G SA core, Airtel for O-RAN RAN Intelligent Controller (RIC), and with Telefonica “O2” UK.

During this period, Mavenir trialled and deployed O-RAN solutions with mobile operators including MTN, Axiata, DISH, Deutsche Telekom and Vodafone, across a mix of public and private mobile network scenarios. In December 2021, Vodafone completed the first data and VoLTE call on 4G small cell Open RAN in partnership with Mavenir.

Following the 2025 recapitalization, Mavenir refocused its O-RAN investment on 4G and 5G small cell radios, and exited the manufacture and distribution of O-RAN radio units for macro networks.

=== Cloud ===
In 2021, Mavenir announced it had cloudified its product portfolio, leading to technology partnerships with vendors including Red Hat, Platform9, AWS, NTT DATA, and Google Cloud. Later that year, Orange announced Europe’s first 5G SA fully end-to-end experimental cloud network in a multi-partner project including Mavenir. The company has since announced deployments of its cloud-native IMS and Converged Packet Core with operators including Deutsche Telekom, Paradise Mobile, Slovak Telekom, Telefonica, T-Mobile Czech, Turkcell, Vodafone and Virgin Mobile O2. In February 2025, Mavenir signed a new five-year contract with O2 Telefonica to transition from its existing virtualized IMS to a cloud-native IMS for 4G and 5G, and in Tune Talk in Malaysia became the first fully cloud-native mobile network operator in the ASEAN region with Mavenir.

=== Non-terrestrial networks (NTN) ===
With the industry seeing global mobile infrastructure investments slowing significantly in 2024, Mavenir openedhttps://www.lightreading.com/satellite/mavenir-s-space-quest-a-fantastic-opportunity-or-a-hail-mary- its core and RAN management software to satellite operators and 5G non-terrestrial networks (NTN). Key early milestones included Mavenir and Terrestar Solutions successfully conducting the industry’s first Narrowband-IoT live data sessions and voice calls over NB-IoT via Geostationary Earth Orbit (GEO) non-terrestrial networks (NTN).

In September 2025, global voice and data satellite communications company Iridium Communications Inc. signed a strategic partnership with Mavenir to accelerate its NTN direct-to-device services and satellite-terrestrial NB-IoT integration with the deployment of Mavenir’s cloud-native Converged Packet Core solution.

=== Artificial Intelligence (AI) ===
In 2025, Mavenir announced a strategic pivot toward AI-native networks, proposing AI and agentic AI throughout the network stack. That same year, Mavenir and e& (formerly Etisalat) announced a long-term technology partnership, which has subsequently seen the pair announce the intention to deploy AI-powered network security e&’s UAE network. In February 2026, Mavenir signed Memorandums of Understanding (MOU) to with Telefonica to create a joint AI Innovation Hub designed to accelerate the integration of artificial intelligence into the evolution of Core Networks, and with TurkCell to accelerate the mobile network operator’s deployment of voice and messaging AI applications.
