= 4G Americas =

Wireless industry trade association

4G Americas is a Wireless industry trade association representing the 3GPP family of technologies. The organization was established in January 2002 under the name 3G Americas. On September 28, 2010, 3G Americas announced the organization's name change to 4G Americas. 4G Americas works throughout the Western hemisphere to inform government agencies, other businesses and the public about the 3GPP wireless technologies.

4G Americas works with government agencies, regulatory bodies, technical standards organizations and other global wireless organizations to promote interoperability and convergence. The organization holds partnership agreements, MOUs or memberships with global wireless organizations, including the 3rd Generation Partnership Project (3GPP), International Telecommunication Union (ITU) and the Inter-American Telecommunication Commission (CITEL) of the Organization of American States, working agreements with the GSMA, UMTS Forum, Next Generation Mobile Networks Alliance (NGMN), the Centro de Investigación de las Telecomunicaciones (CINTEL) in Colombia, the Cámara de Empresas de Servicios de Telecomunicaciones (CASETEL) in Venezuela and Association of Telecommunications Enterprises of the Andean Community (ASETA).
