= Kana Software =

KANA Software, Inc.
- Type: Subsidiary
- Industry: Computer software, Customer service management software, Customer relationship management software
- Founded: 1996
- Headquarters: Sunnyvale, California
- Key people: Mark Duffell (Chairman of the Board, President and CEO)
- Products: KANA Enterprise, KANA Express, LAGAN Enterprise
- Revenue: US$100 million (2012)
- Number of employees: 350 - 500 est. (2013)
- Parent: Verint Systems
- Website: www.kana.com

KANA Software, Inc. is a wholly owned subsidiary of Verint Systems (NASDAQ: VRNT) and provides on-premises and cloud computing hosted customer relationship management software products to many of the Fortune 500, mid-market businesses and government agencies.

In 2014, Verint acquired the operating assets of KANA for $514 million.

== History ==
Mark Gainey founded KANA in 1996. The purpose of the company was to market a software package designed to help businesses manage email and Web-based communications.

In 1999, KANA Communications (as it was then known) acquired Connectify followed by Business Evolution and NetDialog.

In 2000, KANA made its then-largest acquisition, Silknet Software. The purchase price was $4.2 billion, despite the fact that both companies were relatively small. Silknet was an early multichannel marketing software company. Industry analysts were generally cool to the purchase though some said it made sense strategically.

In 2001, KANA merged with BroadBase software. KANA was a major stock market success during the dot-com bubble, and while it contracted significantly during the following downturn, it remained in business as an independent company through the following decade.

In 2010, Accel-KKR acquired KANA's assets and liabilities for approximately $40.82 million. The same year, KANA acquired Lagan Technologies, a government-to-citizen customer relationship management company based in Northern Ireland. The software was rebranded as LAGAN Enterprise, a package that compiles information from sources such as 311 calls and map overlays to improve resource management.

In 2011, KANA purchased Overtone, which allowed companies to monitor social media outlets like Facebook, Twitter and LinkedIn. The software was rebranded as KANA Experience Analytics.

In 2012, KANA acquired Trinicom, a Dutch company that makes mid-market customer service multichannel ecommerce, especially in the BeNeLux region. Less than three months later, KANA purchased Sword Ciboodle, a company that specializes in contact center software. Ciboodle's established business process management gave KANA products for a full-featured CRM package for customer service with social media marketing. The combined organization operates under the KANA brand. Ciboodle's CEO, Mike Hughes, who had led the company prior to its purchase by Sword, left the company after KANA's purchase was finalized. He was replaced by KANA executives.

In 2013, KANA announced the KANA Enterprise product which the company marketed as "a unified platform supporting both agent-based and customer self-service scenarios".

In 2014, security software company, Verint, acquired the operating assets of KANA for $514 million.
