= Airwide Solutions =

- Company type: Private
- Industry: telecommunications
- Founded: United States (2004)
- Defunct: May 2011
- Fate: acquired by Mavenir Systems
- Headquarters: Burlington, United States
- Website: www.airwidesolutions.com

Airwide Solutions was a privately held (majority shareholder smac|partners Germany), but United States–based mobile messaging and wireless internet infrastructure company. It was acquired by Mavenir Systems in May 2011.

The company was founded in 2004 through the acquisition of Schlumberger's Messaging Solutions unit, formerly Sema Group by Taral Networks. Airwide later acquired Finnish company First Hop in 2007.

Neil Papworth, a test engineer at Sema at the time, sent the world's first SMS message from an R&D lab using a personal computer to Richard Jarvis of Vodafone using an Orbital 901 handset in December 1992.

In 2008, Airwide Solutions won the gold award for innovation at the Mobile Advertising and Marketing Awards.

In May 2011, the company was purchased by Mavenir Systems, Inc.

January 26, 2004, Taral Networks Acquires Schlumberger Messaging Solutions.
