= Verint Systems =

American analytics company

Verint Systems Inc.
- Type: Private
- Industry: Software; Business intelligence; Speech analytics; Video analytics; Business consulting; IT consulting
- Founded: 1994; 32 years ago
- Headquarters: Melville, New York, US
- Key people: Dave Rhodes (president and CEO)
- Revenue: ▼US$909 million (2025)
- Operating income: ▲US$106 million (2025)
- Net income: ▲US$65 million (2025)
- Total assets: ▲US$2.29 billion (2025)
- Total equity: ▲US$887 million (2025)
- Owner: Thoma Bravo
- Number of employees: 3,800 (2025)
- Website: verint.com

Verint Systems Inc. is a Melville, New York–based technology company that sells products and services for customer experience (CX) automation. The company offers an open platform, applications, and bots that incorporate artificial intelligence (AI), advanced analytics, large language models, and automated workflows to analyze business intelligence from customer interactions in the contact center, back office, branch, web sites, and mobile apps. This information is used by organizations to achieve a variety of business outcomes, such as increasing productivity and service quality without hiring additional workers, lowering costs, improving the customer experience, and enhancing products, services, and competitive differentiation.

In 2024, Verint had approximately 10,000 clients in more than 175 countries, and approximately 3,700 employees around the globe, plus a few hundred contractors in various locations internationally. The company was previously a majority-owned subsidiary of Comverse Technology and it was formerly known as Comverse Infosys. In February 2013, Verint Systems became independent of Comverse, having bought out the latter's stake in it. In 2025, after being taken private by Thoma Bravo, Verint merged with Thoma Bravo’s portfolio company Calabrio.

== History ==
=== Founding, early years ===
Verint started as Comverse Technology's Comverse Infosys business unit, which was created in 1999 although it was also incorporated in Delaware in February 1994 as a wholly owned subsidiary of Comverse Technology. Verint's initial focus was on the commercial call recording market, which at the time was transitioning from analog tape to digital recorders. On June 7, 1999, the company released an Internet Call Waiting service.

=== Expansion and name change ===
In 1999, Comverse Infosys was combined with another division of Comverse focused on security and the communications interception market. In 2001, Verint expanded into video security by combining with Loronix Information Systems, Inc., which had been previously acquired by Comverse. In 2002, Comverse Infosys changed its name to Verint Systems Inc.

=== IPO, acquisitions ===
In May 2002, Verint completed an IPO and became a public company, although it was still majority owned by Comverse Technology. Since 2006 Verint has acquired several other companies such as MultiVision Intelligent Surveillance Limited, a networked video security business; CM Insight Limited, a UK-based, customer management company; Mercom Systems Inc., an interaction recording and performance evaluation company; ViewLinks Euclipse Ltd., a provider of data mining and link analysis software; and Witness Systems, Inc. a workforce optimization company.

In July 2008 Amit Bohensky founded Focal-Info, a software company focused on web data extraction and analytics. The following month Focal-Info had been bought by Verint for an undisclosed amount, with Bohensky hired back on to lead Focal-Info's "extended activity" within Verint. A subsequent acquisition was of Iontas, in early 2010, a provider of desktop analytics solutions.

Beginning with a stock options backdating scandal in 2006, parent company Comverse Technology suffered a series of financial reporting problems, losses and layoffs, with one consequence that both Comverse and Verint were delisted from the NASDAQ stock market in 2007 and ended up on the Pink Sheets. In July 2010, Verint was relisted on the NASDAQ stock market under the symbol VRNT. By that year, there was considerable talk that Comverse Technology would sell its remaining interest in Verint, with some private equity firms mentioned as possible buyers. In September 2011, Verint acquired Global Management Technologies Corporation, paying around $25 million for it.

=== Full independence ===
In August 2012, Verint announced that it would buy out Comverse Technology's stake in it, in a transaction valued at around $800 million. An FBR Capital Markets analyst said the move "finally eliminates a major overhang on the name by removing Comverse's majority ownership stake." The deal was finalized in February 2013.

In January 2014, the Swiss Federal Department of Justice and Police awarded Verint a contract worth $14.2 million to develop the new Interception System Switzerland ISS 2 wiretapping system.

Over the next few years, Verint acquired several more companies - in February 2014, the CRM provider KANA Software Inc., acquired from Accel-KKR for $514.2 million; in November 2016, the customer experience software company OpinionLab for an undisclosed amount; in December 2017, the intelligent virtual assistant company Next IT for $30 million cash plus up to $21 million in future payments.

On February 1, 2021, Verint spun off its cyber intelligence division as Cognyte, an independent company catering to governments, to become a pure-play customer engagement vendor. Having divested its cyber intelligence and defense offerings, Verint now focused on developing customer engagement and CX automation solutions for the civilian market, including banking, insurance, public safety/sector, retail, and telecommunications organizations.

In August 2025, private equity firm Thoma Bravo agreed to take Verint private in a $2 billion deal. The acquisition closed on November 26, 2025, at which point Thoma Bravo combined Verint with its portfolio company Calabrio to create a combined AI-powered customer experience automation platform. In February 2026, the combined organization announced it would operate under the Verint name, with Calabrio’s products retained within the broader platform.

=== Controversy ===
An article published in Haaretz alleges Verint had "faced backlash" for selling surveillance technology to "repressive regimes" for several years.

On February 2, 2021, Amnesty International reported that an Israeli subsidiary of Verint had "provided the South Sudanese authorities, including the NSS [National Security Services], with communications interception equipment and annual support services" between 2015 and 2017. The NSS has a record of "harassing, intimidating, threatening, arbitrarily detaining and, in some cases, forcibly disappearing and extra-judicially killing" critics of the government. In its report, Amnesty said it "believes that this [sale] goes against Israel’s obligation to protect human rights."

== Products ==
Verint's products include the Verint Open Platform, which incorporates AI and behavioral data from customer interactions, along with numerous AI-powered bots and applications for customer engagement. The platform is modular, allowing organizations to selectively implement bots to align with specific business priorities. The platform supports traditional contact centers as well as contact center as a service (CCaaS) models. Automated workflows support the sharing of customer interaction analysis among the contact center, back office, branch, web sites, and mobile apps.

In June 2024, Verint was named “Best Virtual Agent Solution” in the AI Breakthrough Awards program. The company’s open platform was named a winner in the “Best Use of Artificial Intelligence (AI)” category at the 2024 CX Awards hosted by CX Today.

== See also ==
- Robotic process automation
- Biometrics
- Business intelligence
