= Telephone numbers in New Zealand =

Telephone numbers in New Zealand and Pitcairn Islands
- New Zealand
- Country: New Zealand and Pitcairn Islands
- Continent: Oceania
- Numbering plan type: semi-open
- NSN length: 8 (landline); 9, 10 (mobile)
- Format: (0x) xxx xxxx (0xx) xxx xxxx (0xxx) xxx xxx(x)
- Country code: 64
- International access: 00
- Long-distance: 0

The New Zealand telephone numbering plan describes the allocation of telephone numbers in New Zealand and the Pitcairn Islands.

== History ==
New Zealand's first telephone exchanges, established from 1881, were manually operated, with calls connected by operators. Automatic switching began to be introduced from 1913, and expanded gradually over the following decades, although manual exchanges remained in use in some areas until 1990.

On manual exchanges, telephone numbers were assigned consecutively in ascending order. Multi-party lines were identified by a suffix letter corresponding to the subscriber's ring pattern in Morse code. For example, subscriber 193M was signalled by two long rings, while 193S was signalled by three short rings.

With the introduction of automatic exchanges, the length of local telephone numbers varied between three and seven digits long depending on the size of the exchange and its calling area. Early numbers were limited to five digits long. However, as demand for telephones grew, six-digit numbers began to be introduced in Auckland from 1954, Wellington from 1963, and Christchurch from 1964. Seven-digit numbers began to be introduced in Auckland and Wellington during the 1980s. It was common for telephone numbers of different lengths to coexist within the same area, usually with the city centre or main town having shorter numbers while the outlying suburbs and rural areas had longer numbers. For example, Hastings in early 1990 had five-digit numbers starting with 6 and 8 on the central exchange, while those on the Havelock North and Flaxmere exchanges has six-digit numbers starting with 77 and 79 respectively.

A distinctive feature of New Zealand's telephone system was that rotary telephone dials were numbered in reverse compared with most other countries, with 9 closest to the finger stop and numbers descending anticlockwise to 0. Under pulse dialling, this meant that 9 generated one pulse, 8 generated two pulses, and so on, with 0 generating ten pulses. These characteristics influenced numbering conventions on automatic exchanges. Numbers beginning with 9 were generally not assigned due to the risk of misdialling under pulse dialling. The digit 0 was reserved for the operator, while numbers beginning with 1 were used for special services. When the emergency number 111 was introduced in 1958, it was chosen because its pulse pattern corresponded to the British emergency number 999, allowing compatibility with British-built switching equipment.

Before the introduction of subscriber toll dialling (STD), numbering schemes were localised and not fully integrated. Telephone directories included detailed instructions for dialling between neighbouring exchanges, including the use of prefixes for short-distance toll calls. For example, subscribers on the Halswell exchange dialling Christchurch would dial 1 followed by the local number, while Christchurch subscribers dialling Halswell would dial 22 followed by the local number.

Local calls within an exchange or local calling area were free (a practice that continues for residential customers), while long-distance (toll) calls required operator assistance.

=== Subscriber toll dialling ===
Subscriber toll dialling (STD) was introduced in New Zealand in the mid-to-late 1970s, allowing subscribers to dial long-distance calls without operator assistance. The first exchange to implement STD was Upper Hutt on 9 April 1976. On STD-enabled exchanges, callers dialled 0 followed by the area (STD) code and the local number. Access to the operator moved to 010. Calls to manual exchanges continued to require operator assistance.

STD codes were initially assigned to local calling areas and varied in length from one to five digits (excluding the leading 0). Shorter codes were allocated to the largest centres — for example, 09 for Auckland, 04 for Wellington, and 03 for Christchurch — while smaller towns had longer codes. The numbering plan was structured hierarchically, with smaller exchanges often assigned additional digits within the code of a larger parent area. This often reflected pre-existing local dialling relationships; for example, the Halswell exchange was incorporated into the 03 area code as 03 22, preserving its earlier access code from Christchurch. The combined length of the STD code and local number typically totalled seven digits, but could range from six to eight digits depending on the area.

The rollout of STD continued through the late 1970s and 1980s. In some rural areas, toll calls required brief operator intervention for billing purposes, particularly where party lines were still in use.

A complete list of STD codes from 1987 is below:

Location	Exchange code	STD code
Ahaura	AU	027 23
Ahipara	APA	Connect via operator
Ahititi	AHI	067 25
Akaroa	AO	Connect via operator
Albury	ABY	0505 5
Alexandra	AL	0294
Alfredton	ALF	0650 28
Amberley	AY	0504
Apiti	APA	063 284
Aria	AIA	0813 77
Arrowtown	AW	0294
Arthurs Pass	AHP	0516 34
Arundel	ARD	056 33
Ashburton	ARD	053
Ashhurst	AHI	063 284
Ashley Clinton	ASC	0728 56
Ashwick Flat	AWF	0505 4
Ataahua	AHA	03 290
Atiamuri	ATM	074 38
Auckland	AK	09
Auroa	ARU	062 25
Awakino	AWK	067 29
Awanui	AAI	0889
Balclutha	BL	0299
Balfour	BAL	020
Barrytown	BTN	027 21
Belfast	BEL	03 23
Benneydale	BDE	0813 48
Bideford	BID	059 24
Blairlogie	BLI	059 23
Blenheim	BM	057
Bluff	BLF	021 37
Bombay	BOB	085 20
Brighton	BGN	024
Brightwater	BGW	054
Broadwood	BRW	Connect via operator
Browns	BN	021 37
Brunswick	BSK	064 21
Bulls	BSK	0652
Bunnythorpe	BUN	063 284
Burnham	BHN	03 256
Cambridge	CB	071
Carterton	CI	0593
Cave	CAV	056 23
Centre Bush	CEN	021 360
Cheltenham	CAM	063 289
Chertsey	CY	053 22
Cheviot	CT	05138
Christchurch	CH	03
Clandeboye	CDB	056 22
Clarence bridge	CLB	0513
Claris	CLR	Connect via operator
Clevedon	CDB	09 2928
Clinton	CO	0299
Clyde	CYD	0294 42
Collingwood	CW	0524
Colville	CLV	0843 56
Colyton	COL	063 287
Coromandel	CLB	0843
Cromwell	CMW	0294
Culverden	CVD	0515
Cust	CU	0502 25
Dannevirke	DV	0653
Darfield	DRF	0516 34
Dargaville	DRL	0884
Diamond Harbour	DHB	03 294
Dipton	DIP	0228
Dobson	DOB	027 25
Donnellys Crossing	DCG	Connect via operator
Dorie	DOR	053 20
Douglas	DS	0663 27
Drummond	DMD	021 362
Dunback	DBK	024 850
Dunedin	DN	024
Dunrobin	DUR	020 40
Dunsandel	DSD	03 23
Duntroon	DUN	0297 22
Duvauchelle	DBK	Connect via operator
Edendale	EDD	0223
Egmont Village	EGV	067 22
Eketahuna	EKA	0650 5
Elsthorpe	ELP	0728 64
Elstow	ELS	0819 20
Eltham	ELT	0663 4
Fairlie	FK	0505
Featherston	FN	0553
Feilding	FG	063
Fordell	FDL	064 27
Fox Glacier	FXR	Connect via operator
Foxton	FXR	069
Franz Josef Glacier	FJG	Connect via operator
Galatea	GAL	073 64
Garston	GTN	022 83
Geraldine	GD	056
Gisborne	GS	079
Gladstone	GLS	059 27
Glenavy	GL	0519 23
Glenbrook	GLB	085 33
Glen Murray	GMY	085
Glen Oroua	GNO	063 297
Glenroy	GLY	0516 66
Glentunnel	GLU	0516 67
Gordonton	GOR	071 293
Gore	GG	020
Governors Bay	GOV	03 299
Granity	GC	0289
Greenpark	GPK	03 292
Greymouth	GM	027
Greytown	GN	0553
Haast	HAS	Connect via operator
Halcombe	HAL	063 288
Halfmoon Bay	HMB	021 360
Hamilton	HN	071
Hampden	HA	0297 25
Hanmer Springs	HP	0515
Harihari	HRI	Connect via operator
Hastings	HBN	070
Havelock	HV	057
Hawarden	HAW	0504
Hawera	HW	062
Hedgehope	HGH	021
Helensville	HL	0880
Henley	HY	024 21
Herekino	HKO	Connect via operator
Heriot	HRT	020
Hibiscus Coast	HBC	09 42
Highbank	HIG	053 21
Hikuai	HKK	0843 47
Hikurangi	HG	089 25
Hikutaia	HKA	0816 24
Hilderthorpe	HIT	0297 23
Hilton	HIL	056 34
Himatangi	HIM	063 299
Hinds	HDS	053
Hinuera	HIN	0818 26
Hoe-o-Tainui	HOI	0819 27
Hokitika	HK	Connect via operator
Hororata	HO	0516 68
Houhora	HRO	Connect via operator
Huia	HR	09 8118
Hunterville	HVL	0652
Huntly	HLY	0817
Hunua	HUN	09 2924
Hyde	HYD	0294
Ikawai	IKI	0519 26
Inangahua Junction	INJ	Connect via operator
Inglewood	ID	067
Invercargill	IN	021
Irwell	IRW	03 241
Kaeo	KAO	Connect via operator
Kaharoa	KHA	073 23
Kahutara	KAH	0553 27
Kaiapoi	KI	03 27
Kaiaua	KAA	085 22
Kai Iwi	KW	064 29
Kaikohe	KHO	0887
Kaikoura	KK	0513
Kaingaroa Forest	KFR	073 39
Kaipara Flats	KF	0846 25
Kairanga	KAN	063 290
Kaitaia	KTA	Connect via operator
Kaitangata	KNA	0299 29
Kaiwaka	KWK	0846
Kaponga	KPO	0663 26
Karaka	KA	09 2927
Karamea	KM	0289 26
Katikati	KT	075
Kaukapakapa	KPA	0880
Kawakawa	KV	Connect via operator
Kawau Island	KAU	0846 24
Kawerau	KEU	076
Kawhia	KWA	082 25
Kekerengu	KG	057 20
Kerepehi	KPE	0816 22
Kerikeri	KC	0887
Kimbolton	KIM	063 285
Kiokio	KIO	0813 31
Kirikopuni	KIN	Connect via operator
Kirwee	KWI	0516 36
Kiwitahi	KIW	0819 24
Kohukohu	KOU	0887 55
Kowhitirangi	KOG	Connect via operator
Kumara	KUA	027 29
Kurow	KOW	0298 8
Lake Coleridge	LCR	0516 65
Lake Tekapo	LTK	0505 6
Lawrence	L	Connect via operator
Le Bons Bay	LBS	Connect via operator
Leeston	LSN	03 243
Lepperton	LEP	067 20
Levin	LVN	069
Lichfield	LLD	081 426
Linton	LTN	063
Little Akaloa	LKA	Connect via operator
Little River	LRV	03
Loburn	LBN	0502 28
Lochmara	LOB	057
Lower Moutere	LMO	0524 77
Lumsden	LMS	0228
Lyttelton	LYT	03 28
Maheno	MHO	0297 28
Mahia	MH	0724 25
Maihiihi	MIH	0813 32
Makikihi	MAK	0519 25
Makirikiri	MIK	064 25
Makuri	MRI	0650 23
Mamaku	MMK	073 25
Mamaranui	MMI	0884 36
Manaia	MA	062 4
Manakau	MNK	069 26
Manapouri	MPR	0229 6
Manawaru	MNW	0819 29
Mangakahia	MGL	089 31
Mangakino	MKO	0814
Mangamahu	MAG	064 22
Mangamuka Bridge	MBG	0887 67
Mangatangi	MTP	085 27
Mangaweka	MGA	0658 25
Mangawhai	MWI	0846
Mangonui	MGI	0889
Manurewa	MNR	09
Manutuke	MKE	079 28
Mapua	MPX	054
Maraekakaho	MKK	070 789
Maraetotara	MAO	070 787
Maramarua	MMR	085 25
Martinborough	MBA	0553
Marton	ML	0652
Maruia	MIA	054 38
Masterton	MS	059
Matamata	MAM	0818
Matangi	MTG	071 295
Mataroa	MRT	0658 27
Mataura	MT	020 3
Matawai	MWD	079 24
Matiere	MTW	0812 27
Maungakaramea	MGK	089 23
Maungatapere	MPE	089
Maungatautari	MG	071 272
Maungati	MAN	056 29
Maungaturoto	MAU	Connect via operator
Mauriceville	MV	059 25
Maxwell	MX	064 23
Mayfield	MFD	053
Mercer	MRI	085 26
Methven	MVN	053
Middlemarch	MDL	024 26
Midhirst	MID	0663 28
Milford Sound	MFS	Connect via operator
Millers Flat	MFL	0294 46
Milton	MI	0299 7
Mokauiti	MKJ	0813 76
Mokihinui	MKN	0289 21
Morrinsville	MOV	0819
Morven	MRN	0519 27
Mosgiel	MSI	024 89
Mossburn	MOB	0228
Motea	MOE	0653 25
Motu	MTM	079 35
Motueka	MU	0524
Motukarara	MOT	03 297
Mt Cook	MCK	056 21
Mt Maunganui	MMN	075
Mt Ruapehu	MRP	0812 23
Mt Somers	MSM	053 39
Murchison	MAT	054
Murupara	MUP	073
Napier	NA	070
National Park	NAT	0812 22
Nelson	NN	054
Netherton	NRN	0816 23
New Plymouth	NU	067
Ngahere	NE	027 24
Ngakuru	NR	073 32
Ngarua	NGU	0819 23
Ngaruawahia	NT	071 24
Ngatapa	NGB	079 39
Ngatea	NGT	0843
Ngatimoti	NGI	0524 68
Ngunguru	NG	089 33
Nightcaps	NGC	0225 27
Norsewood	NWD	0653 28
Nuhaka	NK	0724 28
Oakleigh	OKL	089 22
Oakura	OKR	067
Oamaru	OU	0297 22
Ohaeawai	OW	0887 68
Ohai	OIH	0225 26
Ohakune	OKN	0658
Ohangai	OHG	062 22
Ohaupo	OHP	071 296
Ohingaiti	ONG	0652 29
Ohoka	OHK	0502 26
Ohura	OR	0812 28
Okatawa	OKI	062 26
Okaihau	OAH	0887
Okains Bay	OKS	Connect via operator
Okato	OTO	067
Okawa	OOK	070 783
Okere Falls	OF	073 24
Okiwi	OKW	Connect via operator
Okoia	OIA	064 24
Okoroire	OKO	081 424
Omakau	OMU	0294 43
Omakere	OMK	0728 63
Omarama	OMM	0298 4
Omihi	OMI	0504 45
Onewhero	ONH	085 28
Ongarue	OGU	0812 25
Opiki	OPK	063 291
Opononi	OPN	0887 58
Opotiki	OP	076
Opunake	OK	0661
Orama	OFT	Connect via operator
Orawia	OWI	0225 25
Orepuki	ORP	021
Orini	ORN	0817 44
Ormondville	OV	0653 27
Ōtaki	OT	069
Otamauri	OAR	070 782
Otane	OTN	0728 63
Otaua	OTM	085 32
Otautau	OAU	0225 25
Otematata	OMT	0298 2
Otewa	OTW	0813 30
Otipua	OTU	056 24
Otira	OTI	027 20
Otorohanga	OHA	0813 3
Oturehua	OEA	0294 45
Outram	ORA	024 20
Owaka	OAK	0299 29
Owhango	OWN	0812 26
Oxford	OX	0502
Paekakariki	PAE	058
Paeroa	POA	0816
Pahiatua	PHA	0650
Paihia	PIH	0885
Palmerson	PL	024
Palmerston North	PM	063
Panetapu	PNT	082 22
Papakura	PAK	09
Paparimu	PPM	09 2925
Paparoa	PAP	Connect via operator
Paraparaumu	PRM	058
Parawera	PWA	082 27
Parnassus	PAN	05132
Paroa	PAR	027 26
Parua Bay	PAB	089 21
Patea	PA	062 3
Patearoa	PTA	0294 47
Patetongs	PTE	0819 28
Patoka	PTO	070 298
Patumahoe	PHO	085
Patutahi	PHI	079 27
Peebles	PBL	0297 27
Peria	PER	Connect via operator
Picton	PN	057
Picton Sounds	PTS	057
Pigeon Bay	PGB	Connect via operator
Piopio	PIO	0813
Pirinoa	PIN	0553 28
Pirongia	PIR	082 28
Pohangina	POH	063 294
Pokuru	POK	082 23
Pollok	POL	085 30
Pongaroa	POG	0650 26
Port Chalmers	PC	024 72
Port Fitzroy	PTF	Connect via operator
Port Waikato	POW	085 29
Puahue	PUA	082 21
Puhoi	PUH	0846 20
Pukeatua	PTU	082 24
Pukehina	PE	075
Pukekawa	PW	085 24
Pukekohe	PUK	085
Pukerau	PAU	020 23
Puketurua	PUE	081 425
Putaruru	PUT	0814
Queenstown	Q	0294
Raetihi	RET	0658
Raglan	RAG	071
Rahotu	RHU	0661
Rai Valley	RAI	054
Rakaia	RAK	053
Ranfurly	RNF	0294
Rangiora	RR	0502
Rangiotu	RNU	063 296
Rangitaiki	RGT	074 42
Rangiwahia	RGW	063 282
Raupunga	RPG	0724 26
Rawene	RWN	0887 57
Redwood Valley	RDV	054 20
Reefton	RN	027 28
Reporoa	REO	073
Rerewhakaaitu	REW	073 36
Richmond	RDV	054 4
Rissington	RSN	070 295
Riversdale	RVD	020
Riverton	RI	021
Rolleston	ROL	03
Rongotea	RON	063
Ross	RS	Connect via operator
Rotoiti	ROI	073 27
Rotoma	ROM	073 20
Roto-o-Rangi	ROO	071 271
Rotongaro	ROG	0817 66
Rotorua	RO	073
Rotowaro	ROW	0817 68
Roxburgh	R	0294
Ruakaka	RUK	089
Ruakawakawa	RKW	09
Ruatangata	RTG	089 35
Ruatoria	RUT	079
Ruawai	RUW	0884
Runanga	RUN	027 27
Russell	RL	0885
Sales	SAS	0887 75
St Andrews	STA	056 26
St Arnaud	SA	054 36
Sanson	SN	063 293
Scargill	SCG	0504 43
Sefton	SEF	0502 29
Shannon	SHN	069
Sheffield	SD	0516 38
Southbridge	SOU	03 242
South Kaipara Head	SKH	0880 2
Spencerville	SPE	03 298
Spring Creek	SCK	057 25
Springburn	SB	053 30
Springdale	SDL	0819 22
Springfield	SPF	0516 37
Springston	SPN	03 296
Stratford	SFD	0663
Strathmore	STM	0663 23
Studholme-Willowbridge	STJ	0519 28
Sumner	SUM	03 28
Taheke	THK	0887 56
Tahuna	THN	0819 25
Taihape	TPE	0658
Taipuha	TPP	Connect via operator
Tairua	TAR	0843
Tai Tapu	TAA	03 296
Takaka	TAK	0524
Takapau	TPU	0728
Tapanui	TP	020
Tapawera	TPW	054
Tapora	TPR	0846 21
Tapu	TAP	0843 74
Tarata	TTA	067 21
Tariki	TAI	0663 24
Tarras (five-digit)	TRS	0294
Tarras (three-digit)	TRS	029 453
Tasman	TSM	0524 76
Tauhei	TAE	0819 26
Taumarunui	TMN	0812
Taupiri	TPI	0817 45
Taupo	TPO	074
Tauranga	TG	075
Tauwhare	TWE	071 290
Te Akau	TEF	071
Te Anau	TNU	0229
Te Anga	TEG	0813 67
Te Araroa	TRL	079 44
Te Aroha	THR	0819
Te Awamutu	TAW	082
Te Hauke	THU	070 788
Te Kaha	TKE	076 52
Te Kao	TAO	Connect via operator
Te Karaka	TKK	079 23
Te Kauwhata	TUW	0817
Te Kawa	TEK	082 26
Te Kopuru	TKP	0884 37
Te Kuiti	TKT	0813
Temuka	TKE	056 21
Te Pahu	TAU	071 269
Te Pohue	THE	070 291
Te Poi	TEP	0818 27
Te Puia Springs	TPS	079 46
Te Puke	TPV	075
Te Puru	TUP	0843
Thames	TH	0843
The Key	TEY	0229 5
Thornbury	TY	021
Thorpe	THP	054 31
Tikitiki	TII	079 43
Tokokino	TKO	0728 65
Timaru	TU	056
Tinui	TN	059 26
Tirau	TIR	0814
Titirangi	TGN	09 817
Tokanui	TKG	021 398
Toko	TO	0663 22
Tokomaru	TOK	063 298
Tokomaru Bay	TKY	079 45
Tokoroa	TOB	0814
Tolaga Bay	TGB	079 26
Towai	TOI	089 34
Tryphena	TYP	Connect via operator
Tuai	TUB	0724 23
Tuakau	TKU	085
Tuatapere	TTE	0225
Turakina	TUA	0652 26
Turangi	TGI	074 6
Tutira	TTI	070 297
Twizel	TWL	056 20
Umawera	UR	0887
Upper Moutere	UMO	054 21
Urenui	URE	054 21
Uruti	UTI	067
Waerenga	WGA	0817 67
Waianiwa	WAU	021 392
Waiau	WU	0515
Waiau Pa	WAF	085 21
Waihao Downs	WNS	0519 22
Waihaorunga	WIO	0519 24
Waiharara	WHR	Connect via operator
Waihau Bay	WBA	076 53
Waiheke	WH	09 72
Waihi	WAH	0816 3
Waihi Beach	WBH	0816
Waihopai Valley	WHV	057 24
Waikaia	WJA	020 27
Waikaka	WKK	020 22
Waikanae	WAE	058
Waikite	WTK	073 31
Waikoikoi	WOK	020 26
Waikouaiti	WK	024
Waima	WMA	0887 53
Waimahaka	WMK	021 399
Waimamaku	WUK	0887 54
Waimana	WMN	Connect via operator
Waimangaroa	WMG	0289 27
Waimarama	WRM	070 786
Waimate	WE	0519
Waimauku	WM	09
Waimiha	WMH	Connect via operator
Wainuioru	WUR	059 22
Waiotahi	WHI	076 54
Waiotira	WTR	089 29
Waiouru	WIR	0658
Waipahi	WPI	020 28
Waipara	WPR	0504 46
Waipawa	WI	0728
Waipori Falls	WPS	024 24
Waipu	WD	089
Waipukurau	W	0728
Wairau Valley	WRU	057 22
Wairoa	WA	0724
Waitahuna	WNA	Connect via operator
Waitakaruru	WKG	0843
Waitara	WT	067
Waitati	WTI	024 22
Waiterimu	WTE	0817 65
Waitoa	WTO	0819 21
Waituna West	WNL	063 286
Waiuku	WKU	085
Wakanui	WNU	053 23
Wakefield	WLD	054
Walton	WLN	0818 28
Wanaka	WNK	0294 3
Wanganui	WGA	064
Waotu	WAO	081 422
Ward	WB	057 20
Wardville	WAD	0818 25
Warkworth	WW	0846
Waverley	WV	064
Weber	WEB	0653 26
Wellington	WN	04
Wellsford	WFD	0846 3
Westerfield	WSF	053 25
Westport	WP	0289
Whakapara	WKP	089 39
Whakatane	WHK	076
Whangaaehu	WGU	064 26
Whangamata	WGM	0816
Whangamomona	WMM	0663 25
Whangara	WGH	079 22
Whangarei	WR	089
Whangarei Heads	WRH	089 32
Whangaruru	WHN	089 36
Whataroa	WAA	Connect via operator
Whatatutu	WTA	079 21
Whenuakite	WEN	0843 63
Whitianga	WHT	0843
Willowbank	WLB	020 21
Willowby	WIL	053 26
Winchmore	WCM	053 24
Windsor	WSR	0297 26
Winton	WO	021
Woodbury	WRY	056 32
Woodend	WND	0502
Woodville	WDV	0650
Wyndham	WYD	0223

=== Reorganisation ===
Between 1989 and 1993, the New Zealand Phone Number Update standardised New Zealand's telephone numbering plan. The number of STD codes was reduced from about 80 to just five (03, 04, 06, 07, and 09), and local numbers were standardised to seven digits. In many areas, seven-digit local numbers were created by prefixing additional digits to the existing shorter numbers; for example, Hastings (070) 77x-xxx and 8x-xxx became (06) 877-xxxx and 878-xxxx respectively. In Auckland, a new second digit was generally inserted instead; for example, Birkdale (09) 43x-xxx became (09) 483-xxxx. Seven-digit local numbers already in use in parts of Auckland and Wellington were largely retained.

The changeovers were typically coordinated with the annual publication of telephone directories. While most calling areas transitioned to seven-digit numbering in a single stage, some areas required a staged approach to free up numbering blocks for reassignment. For example in Christchurch, the digit 3 was to be prefixed to existing six-digit numbers. This required the Beckenham and Hillmorton exchanges, whose numbers already began with 3, to be converted first to seven-digit numbers beginning with 33 in 1990, allowing the rest of the city to be converted in 1991 and 1992.

Since 1993, landline telephone numbers in New Zealand have followed a structure consisting of a single-digit area code and a seven-digit local number. The first three digits of the local number generally identify the exchange, while the remaining digits identify the subscriber line.

The table below lists known conversion dates by area:

Changeover dates for seven-digit phone numbers
Date	Area	Details
late 1989	Otago (part)	
6 April 1990	Auckland (part)	Henderson, Mount Roskill, Remuera, St Heliers, Three Kings, and Torbay (part) in Auckland area; Warkworth, Mahurangi, Leigh and Matakana exchanges in Warkworth area
9 June 1990	Gisborne	
29 June 1990	Canterbury (stage 1)	Akaroa, Ashburton, Culverden and Kaikoura areas; plus Beckenham, Fendalton, Hillmorton, Memorial Ave, Papanui, Riccarton, Rolleston and St Albans exchanges in Christchurch area.
20 July 1990	Eastern Waikato	Matamata, Morrinsville/Te Aroha, Paeroa, Tokoroa/Putaruru, Waihi and Whangamata areas
24 August 1990	Timaru/Oamaru (stage 1)	Geraldine, Timaru, Kurow, and Oamaru areas
5 October 1990	West Coast (part)	Greymouth area
5 October 1990	Dunedin	
5 October 1990	Southland	
13 October 1990	Hawke's Bay (part)	Napier–Hastings and Waipukurau areas
31 October 1990	Northland (part)	Kaikohe, Kaitaia and Kawakawa areas
3 November 1990	Whanganui	
5 April 1991	Auckland (part)	Helensville, Hibiscus Coast, Pukekohe, and Warkworth areas; Auckland City (part), Birkdale, Devonport, Ellerslie, Glendowie, Huia, Hunua, Karaka, Pakuranga, Paparimu, Takapuna, Titirangi and Torbay exchanges in Auckland area.
25 May 1991	Manawatū	
5 July 1991	Nelson	
5 July 1991	Blenheim	
5 July 1991	Canterbury (stage 2)	Amberley and Rangiora districts; plus Avonhead, Belfast, Burwood, Diamond Harbour, Dunsandel, Greenpark, Halswell, Harewood, Islington, Kaiapoi, Leeston, Lincoln, Lyttelton, Mount Pleasant, New Brighton, Shirley and Spencerville exchanges in Christchurch areas
24 July 1991	Northland (part)	
2 August 1991	South Canterbury and Mackenzie Country	Fairlie, Twizel and Waimate areas
16 August 1991	Bay of Plenty	
30 August 1991	Waikato (part)	
27 September 1991	Northland (complete)	
25 October 1991	Wellington	
22 November 1991	Taranaki (excluding Hāwera)	
29 November 1991	Dannevirke and Wairoa areas	
29 November 1991	Ohakune and Taihape areas	
29 November 1991	Wairarapa	
23 May 1992	Bulls	
22 August 1992	Canterbury (stage 3)	Cheviot and Darfield areas; all remaining exchanges (i.e. Ataahua, Burnham, Christchurch Central, Governors Bay, Irwell, Linwood, Little River, Motukarara, Southbridge, Springston, Sumner and Tai Tapu) in the Christchurch area
29 August 1992	Waikato (complete)	
18 September 1992	West Coast and Buller	
14 November 1992	Hāwera	
21 November 1992	Marton	

== Numbering plan ==
New Zealand implements an open numbering plan. The long distance dialling prefix is 0. In the international network its telephone country code is 64. The international dialling prefix is 00.

=== Landlines ===
New Zealand landline phone numbers have a total of eight digits, excluding the leading 0: a one-digit area code, and a seven-digit phone number (e.g. 09 700 1234), beginning with a digit between 2 and 9 (but excluding 900, 911, and 999 due to misdial guards). There are five regional area codes: 3, 4, 6, 7, and 9. These must be dialled, along with the domestic trunk prefix, when calling a recipient outside the local calling area of which the caller is located. For example, one calling Dunedin from Christchurch must dial 03, even though Christchurch is 03 as well.

The combined domestic trunk prefix and area codes are:

- 02 409 for Ross Dependency (Year-round direct dial access to Scott Base & U.S. McMurdo Station - Summer-only access to Zucchelli Station )
- 03 for the entire South Island and the Chatham Islands
- 04 for the Wellington metro area and the Kāpiti Coast District (excluding Ōtaki)
- 06 for Taranaki, Manawatū-Whanganui (excluding Taumarunui and National Park), Hawke's Bay, Gisborne, the Wairarapa and Ōtaki.
- 07 for the Waikato (excluding Tuakau and Pōkeno), Taumarunui and National Park and the Bay of Plenty
- 09 for Auckland, Northland, Tuakau and Pōkeno.

=== Mobile phones ===
Telephone numbers for mobile phones begin with 02, followed by seven to nine digits (usually eight). The first few digits after the 02 indicate the original mobile network that issued the number.

Telephone numbers must always be dialled in full for mobile phones. In the late 1990s however, Telecom mobile phones could dial other Telecom mobile phones without the (then) 025 prefix, making 025 act like a landline area code.

02X Dialling Code for New Zealand
Prefix	Network	Digits	Notes
0201; 0202	Vocus		Previously allocated to Orcon Internet
0203	Voyager		Previously allocated to HD Net / Accelero
0204	Skinny	6-7	This Code Block was granted to Spark in exchange for the Code Block 028 6 on 15 April 2011
0205	One NZ		Formerly Vodafone New Zealand
0206	Voyager Internet		
0207	Vital		Formerly TeamTalk. Unallocatable as of 5 December 2013
0208	Vital		Unallocatable as of 5 December 2013
0209	Vital		Unallocatable as of 5 December 2013
021	One NZ	6 to 8 digits	6 digits were originally assigned to on-account customers only. 7 digits are assigned to prepaid customers only. Formerly Vodafone New Zealand
022	2degrees	7 digits	2degrees was launched in August 2009.
023	Unused		Owned by One NZ
024	Unused		Protected by Management Committee 30 January 2009 to preserve the potential code expansion option. 0240 is used for Scott Base, Antarctica.
025	Unused	6 or 7 digits	Was used by Telecom New Zealand until it was shut down on 31 March 2007. All numbers have now migrated to 027 (7-digit), with older 025 numbers prefixed with 4 (e.g. 027-4xx-xxxx). Telecom told existing 025 subscribers that their new number was simply their old number with '0274' in front. While technically correct, it is misleading and has resulted in numbers being incorrectly shown in advertising as "0274 xxx xxx". "0274" is not a valid dialling code.
0260	Formerly Vital		This Code Block is active and in use but is marked "Unallocatable" as Vital (formerly TeamTalk) is not a current member of the NAD; this does not impact routing. This Code Block is not subject to LMNP.
026; 0261; 0262; 0263; 0264; 0268; 0269	Spark New Zealand	7 digits	Used for calling Vital Fleetlink or other trunked radios from a phone line. Used for Paging service until shutdown in 2017
02665	Kiwi Mobile	5 digits	
027	Spark New Zealand	7 digits	Formerly Telecom New Zealand
0270	One NZ		Formerly Vodafone New Zealand
0280	Compass Communications		
028	CallPlus or Black + White		
0284	Two Degrees Mobile		This Code Block was allocated to Two Degrees Mobile in exchange for 0266 on 17 July 2015, Warehouse Mobile launched on 28 November 2015 as an MVNO on 2degrees Mobile
02885 02886	One NZ		Previously allocated to M2 Limited and was transferred to One NZ on 6 November 2013. MVNO on One NZ (formerly Vodafone New Zealand).
02889	2Talk	7 digits	
02896	NOW		Previously called Airnet NZ Ltd.
029	TelstraClear (One NZ)		One NZ (formerly Vodafone New Zealand) acquired TelstraClear in 2012.

The introduction of mobile number portability on 1 April 2007 meant that an increasing number of mobiles would be operating on a different network from that which originally assigned the number. To find out whether a particular number belongs to a specific network provider, one can text the mobile number of interest to 300. It is a free service provided by 2degrees. A reply will be sent to verify whether the number is operating on their network or not. As of September 2019, this service will work for Vodafone and Spark Active.

=== Other numbers ===
==== Toll-free and premium-rate calls ====
Toll-free numbers begin with 0508 or 0800, followed by usually six but sometimes seven digits. Premium-rate services use the code 0900 followed by five digits (some with six digits). Local-rate numbers, such as Internet access numbers, have the prefix 08xx, and are usually followed by five digits.

- 0508 Tollfree sold by many network operators (originally launched by Clear Communications as a competitor to the then Telecom-only 0800 range)
- 0800 Tollfree sold by many network operators (originally only available to Telecom NZ, now known as Spark)
- 08xy Various non-geographic services
  - 083210 Call Minder answerphone service
  - 08322 Infocall numbers
  - 0867 Dial-up Internet numbers (retired)
- 0900 Premium rate services

==== Service numbers ====
Numbers beginning with 01 are for operator services.

- 010 National Operator
- 0170 International Operator
- 0172 International Directory Service
- 018 National Directory Service

The "1" codes are used for local services, including activating exchange features. The emergency services number is "111".

- 105 Police non-emergency number.
- 111 Emergency Services Operator (all telephones; forwarded to Fire, Police or Ambulance as required).
- 112 Emergency Services Operator for GSM Mobiles (only) - not advertised.
- 11x Not allocatable. Used internally for specific emergency services.
- 12x Spark repair and sales services.
- 13–19 Various uses, mainly exchange service.

The mobile network also recognises telephone numbers starting with *, including:

- *123 Spark Mobile Sales and Service
- *200 2degrees Mobile Sales & Service
- *222 Automobile Association Roadside Service
- *500 Coastguard Marine Assistance
- *555 Traffic Safety Services (Police non-emergency traffic calls)

Text message numbers for mobile phones are 3 or 4 digits long.

== Dialling prefixes ==
The long-distance trunk prefix is 0. It is dialled before the national number for calls within the country. This digit is usually quoted as the leading digit of the area code. It is not dialling for calls into the country from other countries.

The international dialling prefix is 00. it is dialling before the desired country code and foreign national number.

== Other useful numbers ==
- 1956 - reads back the number the user is calling from (includes the area code "3" 7654321). (not One NZ or 2Degrees, still works on Spark NZ.)
- 1957 - reads back the number the user is calling from (without the area code e.g. 7654321). (not One NZ or 2Degrees, still works on Spark NZ)
- 1958 - sends back the number the user is calling from in DTMF tones. (not One NZ or 2Degrees, still works on Spark NZ)
- 511 - reads back the number the user is calling from (2Degrees Possibly discontinued for Spark NZ, One NZ and carriers using One NZ)
- 083201234 - reads back the pilot number of the line the user is calling from (if calling from a business line in a stepping group) or the individual number on the One NZ network.
- 083201231 - reads back the pilot number as above, with area code. (not active on One NZ or 2Degrees Possibly discontinued on Spark NZ)
- 083201232 - returns the DTMF tones of the line called from. (Not active on One NZ or 2Degrees Possibly discontinued on Spark NZ)
- 137 - ringer test (ringback number); Pick up phone handset, dial 137, hang up, the phone will ring, pick up handset to cancel. (Note: Apparently not now in use (May 2021)) (Not active on One nz or 2Degrees Possibly discontinued on Spark NZ)
- 0196 - Dialled before numbers to show caller ID if it is disabled for outgoing calls on number you are calling from.
- 0197 - Dialled before any normal phone number disables caller ID for the receiving party. (not Spark currently, possibly discontinued for others)
- #31# - Dialled before any normal phone number disables caller ID for the receiving party.
- *32 - Dialled before any normal phone number disables caller ID for the receiving party. (TelstraClear/Vodafone only)
- *67 - Dialled before any normal phone number disables caller ID for the receiving party. (Voyager)

== Fictional numbers ==
New Zealand has no dedicated series of fictional telephone numbers. Television shows and movies generally use any available range of numbers (e.g. the TVNZ soap opera Shortland Street uses the unassigned (09) 4299 number range).

== See also ==
- List of dialling codes in New Zealand
- Telecommunications in New Zealand
- Telephone booths in New Zealand
