= Larry Kestelman =

Australian businessman

- Born: Valarie Kestelman; 1966 (age 59–60); Odesa, Ukraine
- Education: Victoria College
- Known for: Co-founder, Dodo Services; Majority owner, National Basketball League

Valarie "Larry" Kestelman (born 1966) is an Australian billionaire property developer and businessman. He co-founded internet service provider Dodo in 2001, which was bought out in 2013, and has interests in various other industries via his holding company LK Group. He is also known for his involvement in Australian basketball, including as the majority owner of the National Basketball League (NBL) since 2015.

== Early life ==
Kestelman was born in 1966 in Odesa, Ukraine. His father was an electrical engineer and his mother was a gynaecologist. The family emigrated when he was 11 years old as part of a wave of Jewish immigrants leaving the Soviet Union, living for six months in Ostia, Italy, before securing Australian visas.

Kestelman arrived in Australia at the age of 12, with his father finding work as a draftsman with Holden and his mother working as a laboratory assistant at a blood bank. He grew up in Melbourne's south-eastern suburbs, attending Murrumbeena High School before going on to study accounting at Victoria College in Prahran. His first job was in accounts payable department of a tyre company.

== Business career ==
=== Basketball ===
Kestelman became interested in basketball as a spectator in the 1990s. He began sponsoring the Melbourne Tigers NBL team in the early 2000s and acquired the team in 2012, immediately sacking head coach Trevor Gleeson. In 2014 he controversially announced that the team would rebrand as Melbourne United.

In 2015, Kestelman secured a majority 51 percent stake in the National Basketball League in exchange for a A$7 million equity stake. The league was in financial distress with a number of teams close to collapse. In his first year as league owner Kestelman negotiated a new television rights deal, the revival of the Brisbane Bullets, and a revamp of the league's brand identity and digital platform. He subsequently increased his stake in the NBL to 94 percent.

=== Property development ===
Kestelman began investing in property at a young age, starting with a block of land in Caulfield South. He moved from subdividing residential lots to building townhouses, later expanding to large apartment blocks in Footscray and Southbank. In 2015, he launched Capitol Grand, a 50-storey residential tower in South Yarra that would be reportedly be the tallest building in Melbourne outside of the central business district. He retained the penthouse of the development for his own use.

=== Telecommunications ===
In September 2001, Kestelman established internet service provider Dodo Services with his cousin Michael Slepoy and Russian-born Igor Gilenko. He took a 49 percent stake in the company, with Slepoy holding 28 percent and Gilenko 23 percent. The business grew rapidly with a focus on simplifying customer billing, including providing fixed-price plans and unlimited downloads. However, in 2003 Kestelman and fellow Dodo director Mark Baranov were found to have knowingly engaged in "misleading, deceptive and unconscionable conduct", following an Australian Competition & Consumer Commission (ACCC) investigation into misleading advertising. The company was not fined but was ordered to compensate customers and carry out a trade practices compliance programme.

Dodo claimed revenues of $A80 million by 2005 and received a takeover offer from Telstra which was rejected. Dodo was ultimately sold to M2 Group for $A204 million in 2014.

=== Other interests ===
Kestelman's holding company is the LK Group. He offered to purchase 50% of the company Sociabl in 2015, but his offer was declined. As of 2017 his interests outside of property included Philippines-based call centre provider Acquire BPO, recruitment agency First Avenue, investment firm Oxygen Ventures, digital content firm Newsmodo, human resources firm Wall Street, customer loyalty provider Infinite Rewards, and software companies eCal, eTaskr and Saisei. In 2020, LK Group's private equity arm Queens Lane Capital acquired womenswear retailer PAS Group, which owns the Review, Black Pepper and Yarra Trail. In 2021 it acquired footwear and fashion retailer Brand Collective, whose brands include Volley, Shoes & Sox, Shoe Warehouse, Elka Collective, Review Australia and Happy Socks Australia brands. In September 2026, Brand Collective acquired Glue Store, The DOM and Running Bare. In April 2023, Queens Lane Capital purchased bed and mattress company Snooze from Greenlit Brands.

== Net worth ==
Kestelman debuted on the BRW Young Rich List in 2005 with Dodo co-founder Igor Gilenko, with a shared net worth estimated at A$87 million. He debuted on the Financial Review 2017 Rich List with an estimated net worth of A$749 million. As of May 2025, Kestelman's net worth was assessed at A$1.36 billion in the 2015 Rich List.

Year	Financial Review Rich List		Forbes Australia's 50 Richest	
Year	Rank	Net worth (A$)	Rank	Net worth (US$)
2017		$749 million ▲		
2018	97 ▲	$784 million ▲		
2019	122 ▼	$722 million ▼		
2020	135 ▼	$760 million ▲		
2021	139 ▼	$785 million ▲		
2022	123 ▲	$1.10 billion ▲		
2023	110 ▲	$1.27 billion ▲		
2024		$1.30 billion ▲		
2025	103	$1.36 billion ▲		

Legend
Icon	Description
Steady	Has not changed from the previous year
▲	Has increased from the previous year
▼	Has decreased from the previous year
