= Eketāhuna =

Town in Manawatū-Whanganui, New Zealand

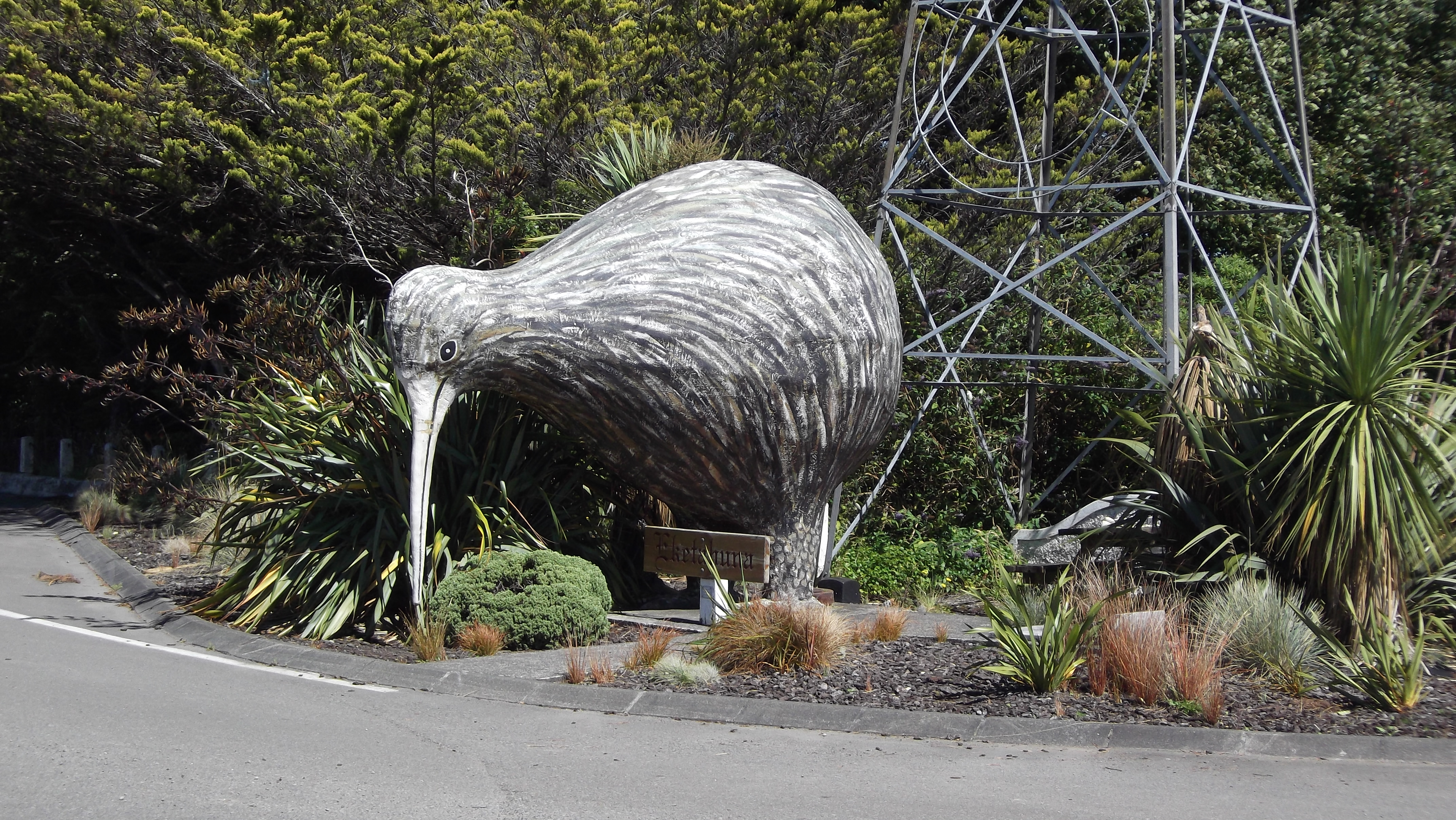
- Eketāhuna Kiwi
- Interactive map of Eketāhuna
- Coordinates: 40.647°S 175.704°E
- Country: New Zealand
- Region: Manawatū-Whanganui
- Territorial authority: Tararua District
- Ward: South Tararua General Ward; Tamaki nui-a Rua Maori Ward
- Community: Eketāhuna Community
- Electorates: Wairarapa; Ikaroa-Rāwhiti (Māori)

Government
  - Territorial Authority: Tararua District Council
  - Regional council: Horizons Regional Council
  - Tararua Mayor: Scott Gilmore
  - Wairarapa MP: TBD
  - Ikaroa-Rāwhiti MP: Cushla Tangaere-Manuel

Area
  - Total: 4.18 km^{2} (1.61 sq mi)

Population (June 2025)
  - Total: 580
  - Density: 140/km^{2} (360/sq mi)
- Time zone: UTC+12 (NZST)
  - Summer (DST): UTC+13 (NZDT)
- Postcode: 4900
- Area code(s): 06

Eketāhuna is a small rural town, in the south of the Tararua District and the Manawatū-Whanganui region of New Zealand's North Island.

The town is located at eastern foot of the Tararua Ranges, 35 kilometres north of Masterton and a similar distance south of Palmerston North. It is situated on State Highway 2, on the eastern bank of the Mākākahi River.

Eketāhuna has become synonymous with stereotypes of remote rural New Zealand towns, with New Zealanders colloquially referring to the town in the same way other English speakers refer to Timbuktu.

The New Zealand Ministry for Culture and Heritage gives a translation of "land on the sandbank" for Eketāhuna. When pronounced in the typical Pākehā way, the name sounds like the Afrikaans sentence "I have a chicken" (Afrikaans: Ek het 'n hoender), making it amusing to immigrant Afrikaans-speaking South Africans in New Zealand.

== Geography ==
The corresponding Statistics New Zealand statistical area covers an area of 892.66 km².

The Pukaha / Mount Bruce National Wildlife Centre is located to the south of the town.

== History ==
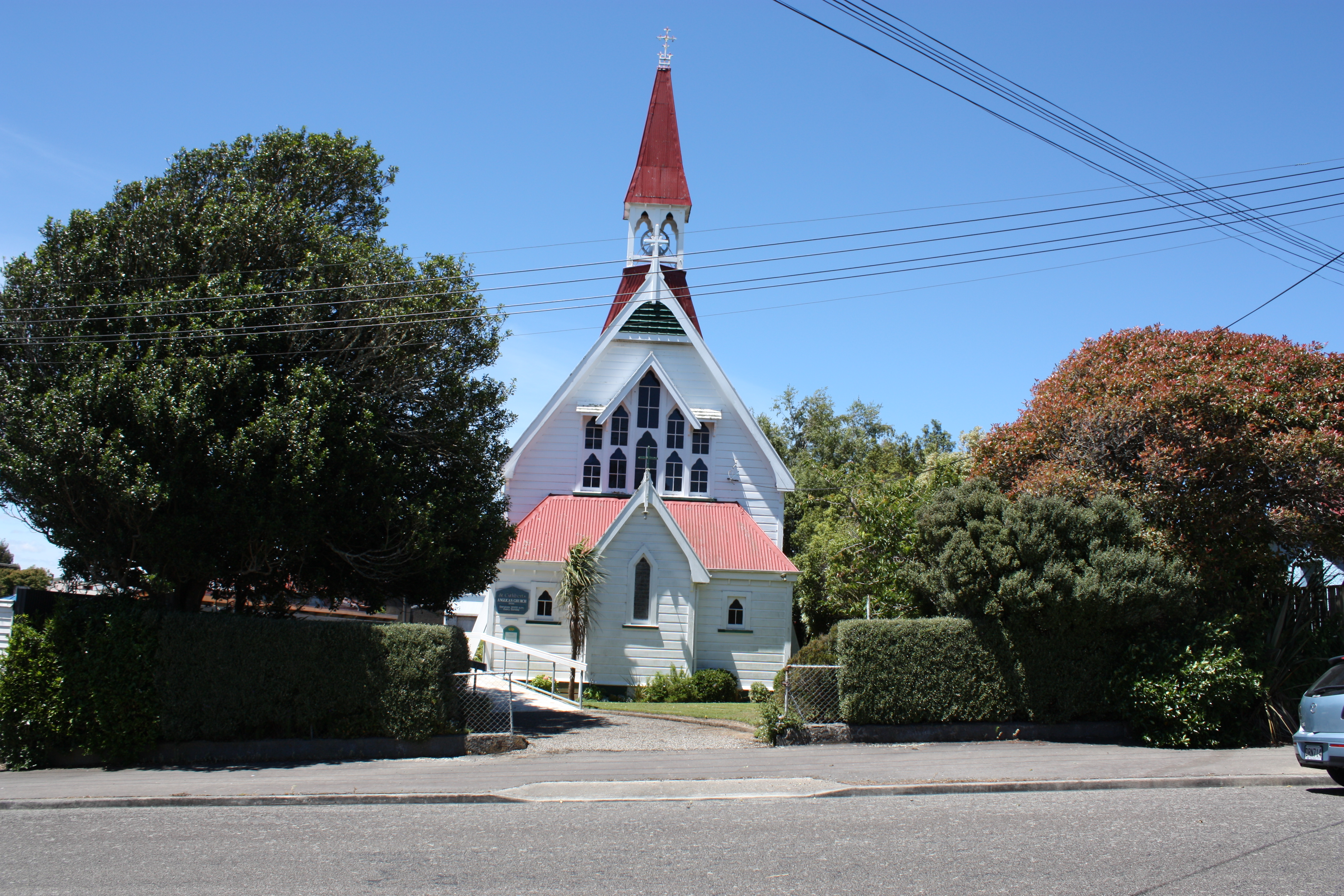
Anglican church in Eketāhuna

=== Early settlement ===
Eketāhuna was settled in 1872, under the name Mellemskov. It was renamed soon after its founding.

=== Modern history ===
The population of Eketāhuna and the wider area has plummeted in the 21st century, dropping from 1,920 in 1996 to just 630 in 2013.

On 20 January 2014, the town was the epicentre of the 2014 Eketāhuna earthquake. Measuring 6.2 on the Richter magnitude scale, the quake caused moderate damage all over the southern North Island.

In July 2020, the name of the town was officially gazetted as Eketāhuna by the New Zealand Geographic Board.

=== Mayors ===
The Eketahuna Borough Council existed from 1907 until 1974 where it superseded by Eketahuna County Council which was later merged into Tararua District.

	Name	Term
1	Alfred Henry Herbert	1907-1909
2	Edward Page	1909-1912
3	F.C. Turnor	1912-1919
4	T. Parsons	1919-1921
5	P. Pike	1921-1923
6	W. Simpson	1923-1927
7	T.M. Page	1927-1929
(6)	W. Simpson	1929-1940
8	W. Olsen	1940-1944
9	O. Walton	1944-1950
10	D.D. Ryan	1950-1953
11	Seymour Alfred Young	1953-1959
12	Victor Anderson	1959-1968
13	Graham Adam	1968-1974

== Demography ==
Eketāhuna is described by Statistics New Zealand as a rural settlement, which covers 4.18 km^{2} (1.61 sq mi). It had an estimated population of 580 as of June 2025, with a population density of 139 people per km^{2}. It is part of the larger Nireaha-Eketahuna statistical area.

Historical population for Ekatāhuna settlement
Year	Pop.	±% p.a.
2006	456	—
2013	444	−0.38%
2018	504	+2.57%
2023	570	+2.49%

Eketāhuna had a population of 570 in the 2023 New Zealand census, an increase of 66 people (13.1%) since the 2018 census, and an increase of 126 people (28.4%) since the 2013 census. There were 276 males, 288 females, and 6 people of other genders in 240 dwellings. 7.4% of people identified as LGBTIQ+. The median age was 47.3 years (compared with 38.1 years nationally). There were 84 people (14.7%) aged under 15 years, 87 (15.3%) aged 15 to 29, 273 (47.9%) aged 30 to 64, and 126 (22.1%) aged 65 or older.

People could identify as more than one ethnicity. The results were 87.9% European (Pākehā); 28.9% Māori; 2.6% Pasifika; 2.1% Asian; 0.5% Middle Eastern, Latin American and African New Zealanders (MELAA); and 2.1% other, which includes people giving their ethnicity as "New Zealander". English was spoken by 97.9%, Māori by 3.2%, and other languages by 4.2%. No language could be spoken by 2.1% (e.g. too young to talk). New Zealand Sign Language was known by 1.1%. The percentage of people born overseas was 12.6, compared with 28.8% nationally.

Religious affiliations were 24.7% Christian, 1.1% Hindu, 2.6% Māori religious beliefs, 0.5% Buddhist, 1.6% New Age, and 1.6% other religions. People who answered that they had no religion were 55.8%, and 12.6% of people did not answer the census question.

Of those at least 15 years old, 48 (9.9%) people had a bachelor's or higher degree, 273 (56.2%) had a post-high school certificate or diploma, and 159 (32.7%) people exclusively held high school qualifications. The median income was $28,500, compared with $41,500 nationally. 15 people (3.1%) earned over $100,000 compared to 12.1% nationally. The employment status of those at least 15 was 198 (40.7%) full-time, 51 (10.5%) part-time, and 21 (4.3%) unemployed.

=== Nireaha-Eketāhuna ===
Nireaha-Eketāhuna statistical area covers 892.62 km^{2} (344.64 sq mi) and had an estimated population of 1,620 as of June 2025, with a population density of 1.8 people per km^{2}.

Historical population for the statistical area
Year	Pop.	±% p.a.
2006	1,497	—
2013	1,452	−0.44%
2018	1,566	+1.52%
2023	1,590	+0.30%

Nireaha-Eketāhuna had a population of 1,590 in the 2023 New Zealand census, an increase of 24 people (1.5%) since the 2018 census, and an increase of 138 people (9.5%) since the 2013 census. There were 807 males, 780 females, and 3 people of other genders in 618 dwellings. 4.3% of people identified as LGBTIQ+. The median age was 41.0 years (compared with 38.1 years nationally). There were 294 people (18.5%) aged under 15 years, 276 (17.4%) aged 15 to 29, 753 (47.4%) aged 30 to 64, and 264 (16.6%) aged 65 or older.

People could identify as more than one ethnicity. The results were 89.6% European (Pākehā); 21.3% Māori; 2.1% Pasifika; 2.5% Asian; 0.8% Middle Eastern, Latin American and African New Zealanders (MELAA); and 3.8% other, which includes people giving their ethnicity as "New Zealander". English was spoken by 97.4%, Māori by 3.0%, and other languages by 4.2%. No language could be spoken by 2.3% (e.g. too young to talk). New Zealand Sign Language was known by 0.6%. The percentage of people born overseas was 10.4, compared with 28.8% nationally.

Religious affiliations were 24.0% Christian, 0.6% Hindu, 1.3% Māori religious beliefs, 0.2% Buddhist, 1.3% New Age, and 0.6% other religions. People who answered that they had no religion were 61.7%, and 10.0% of people did not answer the census question.

Of those at least 15 years old, 180 (13.9%) people had a bachelor's or higher degree, 750 (57.9%) had a post-high school certificate or diploma, and 369 (28.5%) people exclusively held high school qualifications. The median income was $34,300, compared with $41,500 nationally. 84 people (6.5%) earned over $100,000 compared to 12.1% nationally. The employment status of those at least 15 was 654 (50.5%) full-time, 189 (14.6%) part-time, and 33 (2.5%) unemployed.

== Economy ==
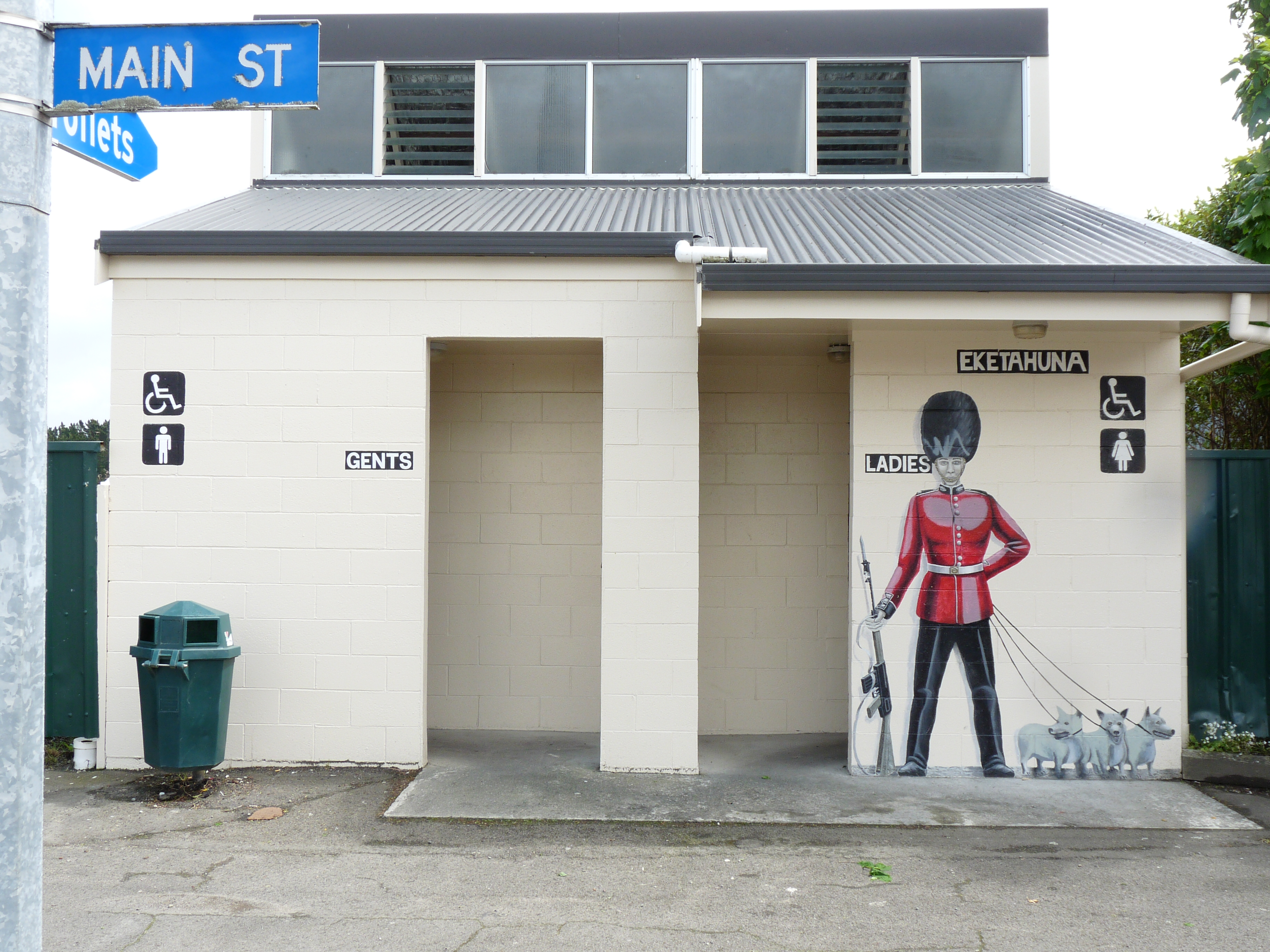
Public toilets

In 2018, 5.0% of the workforce worked in manufacturing, 6.1% worked in construction, 5.0% worked in hospitality, 1.4% worked in transport, 3.9% worked in education, and 6.4% worked in healthcare.

== Transport ==
As of 2018, among those who commute to work, 46.4% drove a car, 3.2% rode in a car and 2.9% walked or jogged. No one commuted by public transport or cycled.

== Education ==
Eketāhuna School is a co-educational state primary school for Year 1 to 8 students, with a roll of 101 as of July 2026. It opened in 1879, with a roll of 15 and an average of 10 attending.

Eketahuna District High School opened in 1912 and was merged with Woodville and Pahiatua schools to Pahiatua in 1960.

== Notable people ==
- Ellen Anderson (1882–1978), district nurse in Eketāhuna
- John Dawson (1928–2019), botanist
- Tania Lineham, born 1966 in Eketāhuna. Royal Society of New Zealand, Science and Technology Teacher Fellowship in 1999 and the Prime Minister's Science Teacher Prize in 2015.
- Kieran McAnulty (born 1985), politician

== See also ==
- List of towns in New Zealand
- Regions of New Zealand
