= Sociabl =

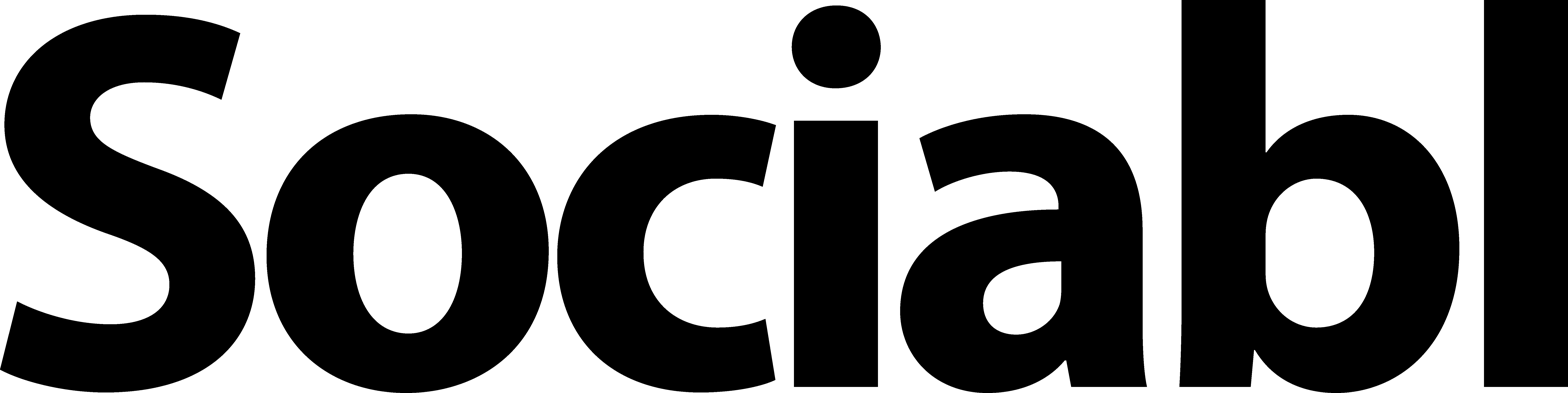
- Owners: Brandon Reynolds; Jarrad Hrotek
- Website: www.sociabl.co
- Launched: 2014

Sociabl was an online platform that was designed to allow people to purchase experiences with celebrities, with a portion of funds going to charities. As of January 2016, Sociabl's claimed client list included Richard Branson, Will.i.am and Chris Paul, which has since been disputed.

== Beginnings and early history ==
Sociabl was founded in 2013 in Adelaide, South Australia by Brandon Reynolds and Jarrad Hrotek. The initial idea came about when Reynolds and Hrotek were living in Melbourne and realised just how difficult it was to get directly in contact with celebrities while trying to find a brand ambassador for a previous business idea. Upon discovering this they decided to create a platform that would enable anyone in the world, the opportunity to easily connect with any of the world's biggest stars for a one-on-one experience.

In early 2015, with no connections or knowledge of investors, Reynolds scoured the internet and found the emails of every single member of the BRW Rich 200 List, and sent them a pitch for Sociabl. "We had no idea, we were googling what venture capital was," Reynolds said in regards to investment. The first reply came from Xero CEO Rod Drury who seemed positive, and 20 others eventually got back to him. From there five meetings were booked, and one lead ended up becoming successful.

== Growth ==
In April 2015, Sociabl raised a $150,000 seed round from top Australian investors including Jeff Chapman, Xiao Cao Shiru and Simon Reynolds.

Sociabl opened an office in Los Angeles that August, bringing on board a Talent Team local to the entertainment capital. Then in September also opening another office in London.

In October 2015, Reynolds turned down a $2.5 million offer from Dodo Services Founder, Larry Kestelman, in exchange for 50% of the company. But with the way the startup was structured and $200,000 already in the bank, the team was in a position to forgo the offer in order to maintain control of the company. "Sending back with a ‘thanks but no thanks’, it was certainly a very tense moment when I pushed send on that email," Reynolds said in regards to rejecting the offer.

In December 2015, Sociabl was in negotiations with two venture capital firms for a $1.4 million investment that would value the company at $9.5 million.

Sociabl was named in the Top 5 Australian Startups to watch in 2016 by Business Insider and Startup Smart.

As of 2015, Sociabl employed more than 11 people across offices in Australia, United Kingdom and United States.

In February 2016, The Australian Financial Review reported that Sociabl had been bought out by Australian Entrepreneur and Imagination Games CEO, Shane Yeend, for an undisclosed amount.
