= 9020 =

9020 may refer to:

== In general ==
- 9020 BCE, a year in the 10th millennium BC
- 9020 CE, a year in the 10th millennium
- 9020, a number in the 9000 (number) range

== Places ==
- 9020 Eucryphia, an asteroid in the Asteroid Belt, the 9020th asteroid registered
- Vermont Route 9020. a state highway
- Telephone exchange 9020, a local exchange in New Zealand; see List of dialling codes in New Zealand

== Products ==
- CP Class 9020, a diesel locomotive train class
- HP 9020, a computer workstation in the HP 9000 series
- IBM 9020, a mainframe computer model used for air traffic control
- John Deere 9020, a tractor series; see List of John Deere tractors
- Kintetsu 9020 series, an electric multiple unit train series
- Tokyu 9020 series, an electrical multiple unit train series

== Other uses ==
- East Japan Railway Company (stock ticker: 9020)
