= Southern Cross Telco =

Telecommunications company in Australia

Southern Cross Telco Holdings
- Company type: Subsidiary
- Industry: Telecommunications
- Founded: 1994
- Fate: Acquired
- Headquarters: Hobart, Tasmania
- Products: Phone; Mobile; Broadband
- Revenue: A$44.4m
- Parent: M2 Group
- Website: www.sctelco.com.au

Southern Cross Telco, also known as Southern Cross Mobile or Southern Cross Telco & Mobile, is an Australian communications company, offering landline phone, mobile phone and internet services. They are based in Hobart, Tasmania.

Their phone services use the Telstra GSM and CDMA networks and they resell Telstra ADSL.

They were formerly a subsidiary of Australian company Orion Telecommunications, which bought the European former parent company NewTel in 2004, but now operate as a subsidiary of M2 Group.
