= Ellen Alice Anderson =

New Zealand district nurse

Alice Anderson
- Born: Ellen Alice Anderson; June 22, 1882; Eketāhuna
- Died: February 4, 1978 (aged 95); Palmerston North
- Occupation: Nurse

Ellen Alice Anderson (22 June 1882 – 4 February 1978) was a New Zealand district nurse. She was born in Eketāhuna, Wairarapa, New Zealand on 22 June 1882.

== Early life ==
Anderson was born to Swedish immigrants Johanna Mason and Anders Anderson. Her parents had arrived in the Wairarapa in 1873 and her father, a farmer by the time of her birth, had worked building road and rail in the area with other Scandinavian settlers. Anderson was the couple's sixth child.

Anderson attended Eketāhuna School. In March 1899 she was confirmed as Anglican at St Cuthbert's Church in Eketāhuna, by Frederick Wallis, the bishop of Wellington.

== Career ==
Anderson became the second nurse to be enrolled at Masterton Hospital in August 1905. Working under hard conditions for low wages, she transferred to Wellington District Hospital after six months on the advice of Grace Neill, the deputy inspector of hospitals. Anderson completed her training in 1909, and went case nursing in Taranaki, the Malborough Sounds, Marton, and then Eketāhuna for five years. In Eketāhuna, she worked with Dr J. P. S. Jamieson, helping him perform a wide range of medical duties in the home.

In 1919 Anderson was appointed District Nurse in Eketāhuna by the Masterton Hospital Board. She worked under this role for a further fourteen years, receiving a yearly salary of £100, which she nursed privately to supplement.

In 1931, Anderson helped to transport victims of the Hawkes Bay Earthquake to temporary hospitals. She retired from nursing in March 1935, though she continued her involvement with the Eketāhuna community. Anderson never married, and died in Palmerston North on 4 February 1978.
