= Acquire Intelligence =

Outsourcing company in Australia

Acquire Intelligence Pty. Ltd.
- Type: Private
- Industry: Business process outsourcing Call Center
- Founded: 2005
- Headquarters: Melbourne, Australia
- Key people: Scott Stavretis – (CEO); Kathryn Marshall – Chief Commercial Officer; Matt Carracher – Chief Operating Officer; Dana Andel – Country Manager Philippines
- Revenue: USD 1.48 billion
- Number of employees: 9,500
- Website: acquire.ai

Acquire Intelligence (formerly Acquire BPO) is a business transformation company and a leading global provider of business process outsourcing (BPO) and AI consulting services. Their transformation approach is built around the Automate, Eliminate, Reallocate framework, which blends process improvement, automation, and global outsourcing.

== History ==
=== Formation ===
Registered initially as Acquire Asia Pacific, the business was founded by two entrepreneurs with a background in contact centre outsourcing, Max Tennant and Jonathan (Jono) Smith. Jono had been living in the Philippines for several years, setting up contact centres for US companies. Together they identified the opportunity for Australian companies to operate from the Philippines, a new concept in the Australian market.

Acquire was initially focused on providing consulting services to Australian companies to help them navigate the complexities of outsourcing to the Philippines and provide knowledgeable consultants on the ground to ensure that work was delivered to a high standard. Acquire's first customer was APPT, an Australian Telco, followed by several other brands like Ingram Micro, AEGON Insurance, St George and Dodo, a budget ISP.

In September 2006 Max and Jono partnered with Larry Kestelman, the owner of Dodo to provide full-service outsourcing initially to Dodo, with a plan to expand to other customers after. Max and Jono later sold their interests in Acquire 25 October 2007, but are recognised by the industry as setting the foundation of what the company is today.

=== Expansion ===
In 2013 the company moved their headquarters to Melbourne, Australia.

Acquire BPO opened a new site in Dallas, Texas in the United States in 2015. The following year, it formally inaugurated its newest delivery center in the Dominican Republic.

With its July 2020 acquisition of The Smart Group Australia, it now offers onshore, offshore and Work from Home.

Acquire BPO launched a new US headquarters at 3660 Regent Boulevard, Irving, Texas in December 2023. In 2025, the company rebranded from Acquire BPO to Acquire Intelligence.

== Products and services ==
From offering contact centre and back office services, including data entry, HR administration, payment processing, accounting and bookkeeping, Acquire has expanded to establish an Automation and Intelligence line of business, Acquire.AI, specializing in Robotic Process Automation (RPA), chatbots, voice biometrics and speech analytics.
