= Telecommunications in New Zealand =

Telecommunications in New Zealand are fairly typical for an industrialised country.

Fixed-line broadband and telephone services were largely provided through copper-based networks, but fibre-based services now represent the majority of connections. Spark New Zealand, One NZ, and 2degrees provide most cellular network services, while a number of smaller mobile virtual network operators also exist.

== History ==
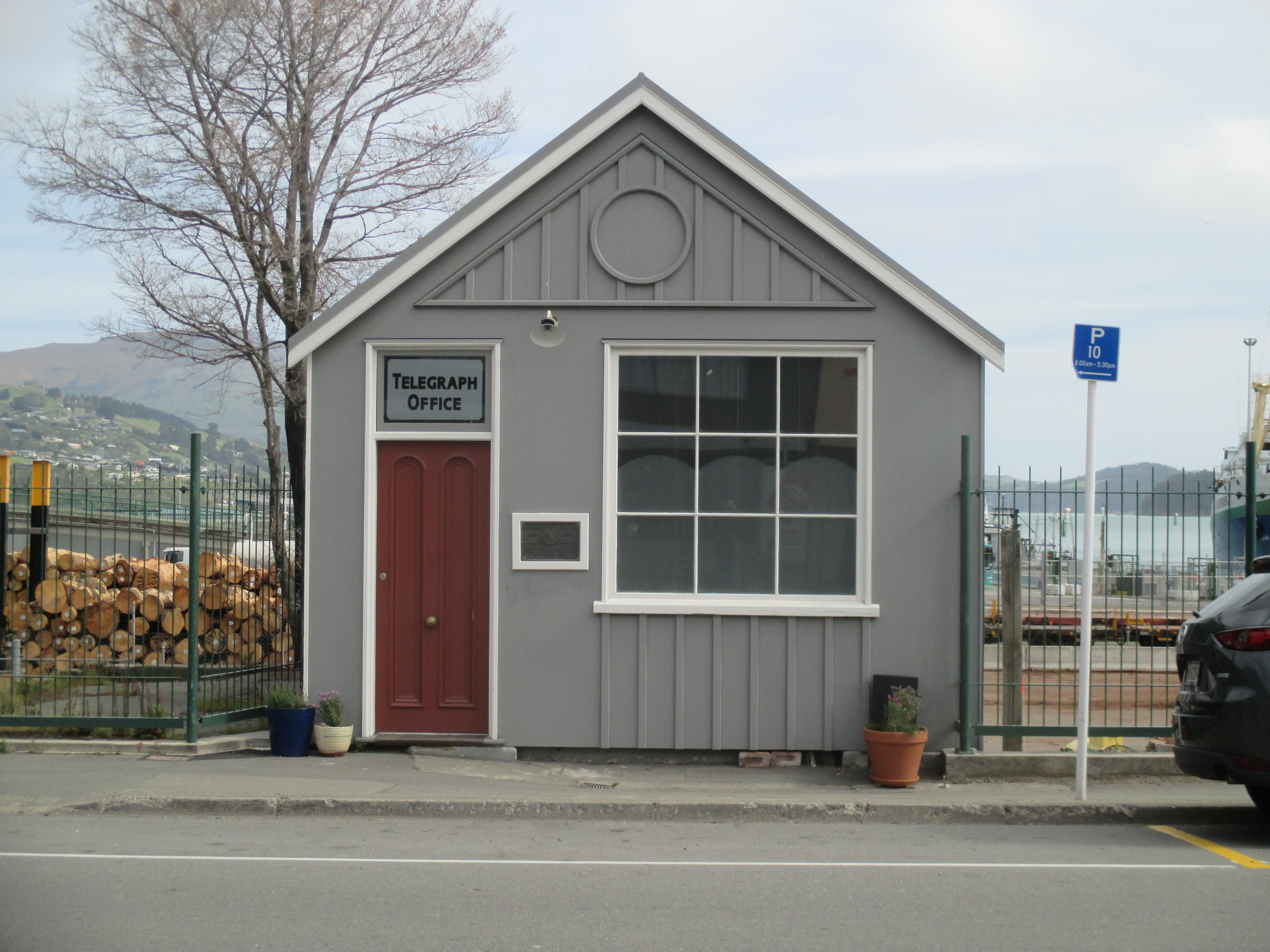
The historic telegraph office in Lyttelton from which the first telegraph transmission in New Zealand was made

The first telegraph opened in New Zealand between the port of Lyttelton and Christchurch on 16 June 1862. The line was constructed along the Lyttelton–Christchurch railway line. The Vogel era from 1870 saw a major expansion of the telegraph network, including an inter-island cable. Telegraph lines increased from 699 miles (1,125 km) in 1866 to 3,170 miles (5,100 km) in 1876. The first overseas telegraph cable between Australia and New Zealand began operation on 21 February 1876.

The first verified telephone call in New Zealand took place on a test line between Dunedin and Tokomairiro (now Milton) on 2 February 1878, less than two years after Alexander Graham Bell's first successful telephone operation. Within two months, lines were in place between Christchurch, Dunedin, and Cromwell.

The Electric Telegraph Department formed to manage the growing telegraph network was merged with Post Office Department to form the New Zealand Post and Telegraph Department in 1881.

Following early experiments with telephones on telegraph lines, the colonial government established a state monopoly in telephony with the Electric Telegraph Act 1875. By 1900 there were 7,150 subscribers to telephone services. Telephony subscriptions grew greatly over the next century; it was estimated by 1965 that 35% of New Zealanders had a telephone.

By the 1980s there was major telephony traffic congestion on the New Zealand Post Office network. In Auckland, the central exchange was overloaded and "verging on collapse"; elsewhere in New Zealand users often experienced network overloading and crashes. Some areas still had manual telephone exchanges; Queenstown, for example, was not upgraded to automatic service until 1986. The New Zealand Post Office was highly inefficient, being hamstrung as a government department and required to apply to the Treasury for capital investment. As the Post Office was a monopoly, it had no incentive to improve customer service.

The monopoly over telecommunications came to an end in 1987 when Telecom New Zealand was formed, initially as a state-owned enterprise and then privatised in 1990. Competition began in the early 1990s, greatly reducing prices. The first competitor to market was Clear Communications, a consortium of North American and New Zealand businesses. Chorus, which was split from Telecom (now Spark) in 2011, still owns the majority of the telecommunications infrastructure, but competition from other providers has increased.

The Telecommunications Act was passed in 2001 and, since amended, is still the principal legislation. The Commerce Commission required operators to introduce local and mobile number portability in 2007. A large-scale rollout of gigabit-capable fibre to the premises, branded as Ultra-Fast Broadband, began in 2009 with a target of being available to 87% of the population by 2022, which was achieved. As of 2017, the United Nations International Telecommunication Union ranks New Zealand 13th in the development of information and communications infrastructure.

The Commerce Commission began regulating mobile termination rates, the fees networks charge for mobile calls from another network, in 2010. Regulating the rates facilitated the entry of a third mobile operator to the market. Regulations govern national roaming, which allows customers on one mobile network to use another network's cell phone towers in places where they do not have their own. ‌Regulations govern mobile co-location, requiring operators to share physical infrastructure with other operators.

== Telephones ==
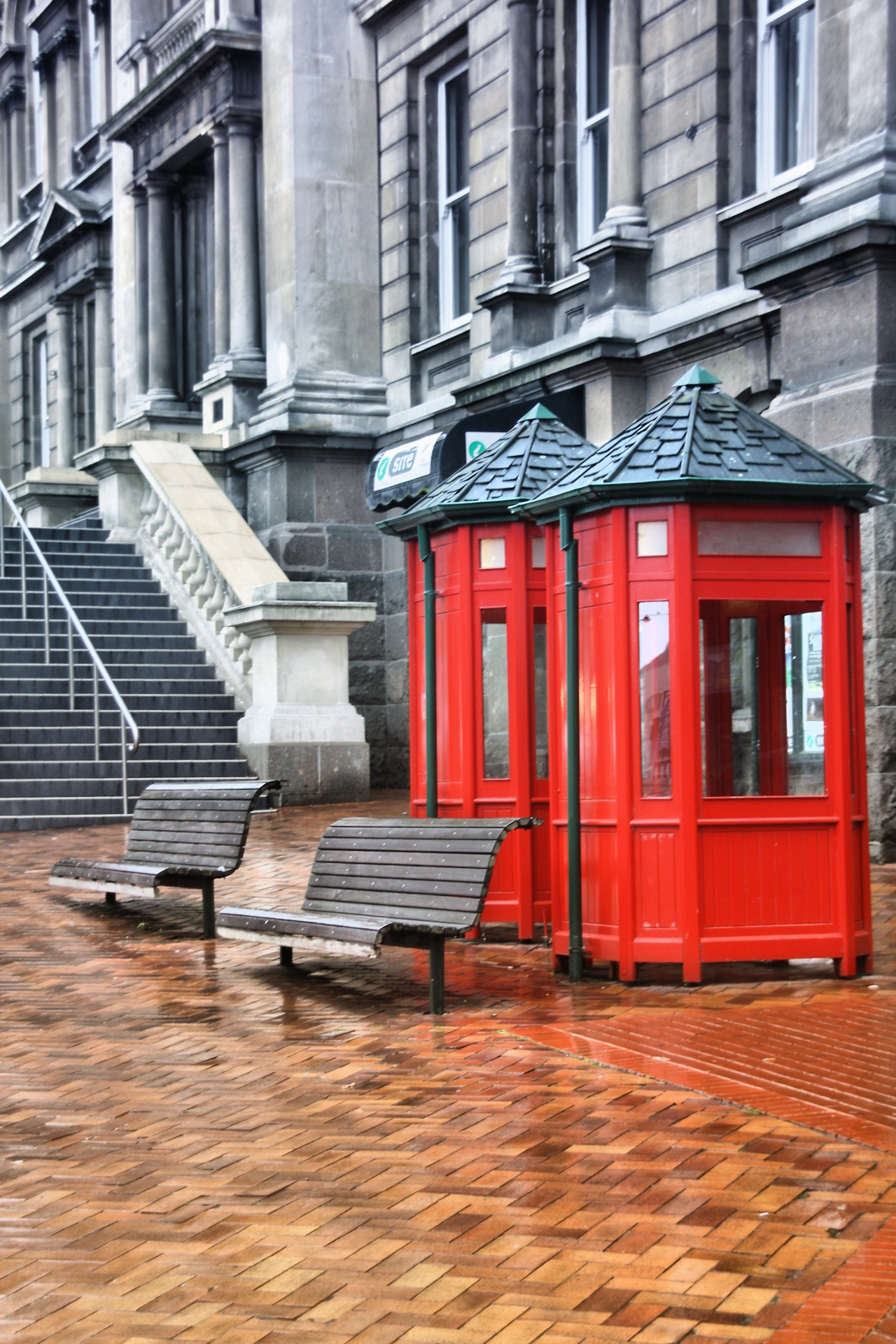
Telephone booths in Dunedin

- Country calling code: 64. This code is also used to reach Scott Base in Antarctica and the United States base McMurdo Station nearby.

=== Mobile phone system ===
- Number of mobile connections: 5.8 million (2021)
- Coverage available to approximately 98% of the population.
  - Operators:
    - 2degrees (operating UMTS and LTE)
      - Virtual network operators: Warehouse Mobile (owned by The Warehouse Group), Nova Energy, Orcon (merged with 2degrees on 21 November 2024), Slingshot (owned by 2degrees), Kiwi Mobile (owned by Electric Kiwi) and Zeronet
    - One NZ (operating GSM, UMTS, HSDPA and LTE)
      - Virtual network operators: Flexiroam, Kogan Mobile NZ, Mighty Mobile (owned by Mighty Ape), Rocket Mobile (formerly MyRepublic), Contact, Farmside, Primo Mobile
    - Spark (operating GSM, UMTS, LTE and 5G)
      - Virtual network operators: Skinny (owned by Spark), Digital Island, Compass Communications and Mercury Mobile

=== Fixed-line telephone system ===
- Number of fixed line connections: 1.92 million (2000)
- Individual lines available to 99% of residences.
- VoIP cloud-based voice services are now mainstream.
- Traditional copper line operators:
  - Chorus Limited: A large numbers of Internet service providers (ISPs) (referred to as "retail service providers") retail Chorus' connections to personal and business customers. As a wholesaler, Chorus does not retail internet connections to end users.

=== Cable and microwave links ===
- Domestic:
  - Optical fibre and microwave links between cities
  - Submarine optical fibre cables between the North Island and the South Island
- International:
  - Submarine cables:
    - Hawaiki Cable (launched July 2018)
    - Southern Cross Cable (to Australia and Hawaii)
    - TASMAN 2 (to Australia)
    - Tasman Global Access (to Australia, completed March 2017)
    - Moana Cable (proposed)
  - Satellite earth stations: 2 Intelsat (Pacific Ocean)

=== Payphones ===
New Zealand's first payphones were installed in 1910, which was 21 years after the first ones in the United States. They were originally bright red. As of May 2022, there are approximately 2000 payphones in New Zealand, which few people use anymore due to the abundance of cell phones. Some of them offer WiFi with a reception radius of 50 metres. Most calls made on these phones are 0800 numbers. Telecom previously made phone cards, which had various designs such as New Zealand plants and birds. They were a fad for collectors; some cards would sell for up to $14,000. Telecom phased these out completely in 1999, which caused prices of phone cards price to drop significantly.

== Radio ==
- Radio broadcast stations: AM 124, FM 290, shortwave 4 (1998), 4 on Freeview digital satellite
  - See also: List of radio stations in New Zealand
- Radios: 3.75 million (1997)

== Television ==
- Television broadcast stations: 41 (plus 52 medium-power repeaters and over 650 low-power repeaters) (1997)
  - These transmit 4 nationwide free-to-air networks and a few regional or local single transmitter stations. Analogue was phased out between September 2012 and December 2013.
  - Digital Satellite pay TV is also available and carries most terrestrial networks.
  - Freeview digital free satellite with a dozen SD channels, with SD feeds of the terrestrial HD freeview channels
  - Freeview, free-to-air digital terrestrial HD and SD content
  - See also: List of New Zealand television channels
- Televisions: 1.926 million (1997)

== Internet ==
- Internet service providers: 36 (2000)
- Internet users: 4.55 million (2021)
- Fixed internet connections: 1.24 million (2013)
- Country code (top-level domain): .nz

== Telecommunications Development Levy ==
The government charges a $50 million Telecommunications Development Levy annually to fund improvements to communications infrastructure such as the Rural Broadband Initiative. It is payable by telecommunications firms with an operating revenue of over $10 million, in proportion to their qualified revenue.

== See also ==
- Economy of New Zealand
- Telephone booths in New Zealand
