= Eftel =

Telecommunications company in Australia

Eftel Limited
- Company type: Subsidiary
- Industry: Internet service provider Telecommunications
- Founded: 1999
- Defunct: 2022
- Headquarters: Melbourne, Victoria
- Products: Broadband; Wholesale Internet Services; Dialup; Telephony
- Parent: M2 Group
- Website: www.eftelretail.com

Eftel Limited was an internet service provider and telecommunications provider in Australia, with approximately 120,000 active accounts. It was established in 1999. Eftel offers a range of services including: DSL and dial-up Internet access, web hosting and telephony services - to the retail, corporate and wholesale telecommunications markets.

Eftel's services are delivered through a nationwide network of points of presence in all capital cities and regional areas around Australia. The network architecture and technology allows for the supply of voice, data or video services simultaneously; giving the capability to supply local and long-distance calls, high-speed data, Internet and video conferencing services to its customers.

In 2013, Eftel was acquired by the rival M2 Group (now Vocus Group) for approximately $44.1 million. The company and its former subsidiaries, including aaNet and ClubTelco now operate as brands of M2.

== History ==
1999 Datafast commenced as a trunked radio network operator in Victoria. From 1999 to 2001, it developed a 34 Mbit/s ATM backbone network in western Victoria. Ultimately the network extended to Mount Gambier in South Australia, with a hub in Melbourne and links to other state capitals.

2000 Eftel started as an Internet service provider (ISP) based in Perth, Western Australia.

2001 Datafast acquired a VoIP (Voice over Internet Provider) telecommunications company, and VivaNET, a wholesale only ISP.

2002 Datafast merged with Eftel, an ISP and broadband telecommunications carrier. The merger doubled the size of the company, providing significant economies of scale, and extended broadband operations into four states.

2003 Through consolidation and other initiatives, Datafast significantly reduced its networking costs, established a Layer-2 ADSL service, and extended the network to South Australia and the Northern Territory. These initiatives helped the company to take advantage of two current trends: industry consolidation and the take-up of broadband Internet access. In late 2003, Datafast acquired ISPs KeyPoint, EZ Web, and Impaq. These purchases raised the size of the customer base to 85,000 and extended broadband coverage to Tasmania, completing the national roll-out.

2004 In January 2004, Datafast acquired NSW ISP Planet Netcom, adding a further 15,000 accounts and bringing the total customer base to over 100,000, making the company one of Australia's 10 largest ISPs. In June 2004, Datafast acquired Bunbury based ISP OzzieNet, and in October Datafast acquired Affinity, a Melbourne-based ISP and its umbrella of brands, taking the total number of active accounts on the Datafast network to 120,000.

2005 Acquired ViaNetAIP and MyAccess. Launched Speak voice product, packaged retail product range and Broadband over PowerLines (BPL). Datafast Telecommunications Ltd changes name to Eftel Limited.

2006 Acquired aaNet, a specialist broadband provider. Launched Speak voice product, packaged retail product range and Broadband over PowerLines (BPL). Datafast Telecommunications Ltd changes name to Eftel Limited.

2007 Eftel became the first company in Australia to announce a VDSL2 rollout. The technology will enable theoretical speeds of up to 100 Mbit/s, about 4 times faster than ADSL2+. However, as of October 2009, the VDSL2 rollout is still at the "expressions of interest" stage with no services in active operation; the aaNet VDSL2 EOI page can be seen here. http://www.aanet.com.au/vdsl_news

2011 Eftel completed a merger with ClubTelco a premium consumer focused telecommunications company that rewards its members with a range of benefits. This merger has seen the company double in size.

In August 2011, Eftel acquired wholesale telecommunications service provider Platform Networks Pty Ltd. Platform Networks is a Sydney-based growing wholesale aggregator.

2012 In June 2011, Eftel announced the acquisition of the corporate and residential customer bases of West Australian Networks (www.westnet.net.au). On 6 August 2012 Eftel announced the acquisition of Visage Telecom

2013 Eftel acquired by M2 Group. Eftel continues as a business unit.

2022 Eftel business unit closed down. Eftel web and mail servers continue in place.
