= People Telecom =

People Telecom Pty Ltd
- Company type: Subsidiary
- Industry: Telecommunications
- Founded: 2000
- Founder: Ryan O'Hare; Colin Marland
- Fate: Acquired
- Headquarters: North Sydney, Australia
- Products: Broadband; Telephone; Mobile; Web Hosting
- Revenue: A$90,000,000 (2006)
- Number of employees: 70
- Parent: Vocus Group
- Website: www.peopletelecom.com.au

People Telecom is an Australian telecommunications company and subsidiary of Vocus Group. It resells internet access and telephony services. It was founded in 2000 by Ryan O'Hare and Colin Marland.

In 2004 People Telecom achieved stock market listing by doing a reverse takeover of Swiftel Ltd. People Telecom was listed in the 2005 Australian Deloitte Fast 50 list of growing companies. In August 2007, John Stanton took over as chief executive officer from founder Ryan O'Hare.

Swiftel Ltd was a listed Australian company founded in 2000 by Christopher Gale. It was granted a Telecommunications licence, and took control of Roebuck Resources, a listed speculative mining investment company, by reverse takeover. At the time of its takeover by People Telecom, it had a growing data telecom business, but was under-capitalized for rapid expansion.

People Telecom was acquired by M2 Group in December 2008. M2 Group merged with Vocus Communications on 22 February 2016 in a merger worth AU$3.75 billion.
