= ClubTelco =

Australian telecom company

- Type: Subsidiary
- Industry: Telecommunications
- Founded: Gold Coast, Australia 2010
- Defunct: 21 July 2020
- Headquarters: Melbourne, Australia
- Services: Landline; Broadband; VoIP; Mobile; Mobile Broadband
- Parent: Vocus Group

ClubTelco was an Australian telecommunications and Internet service provider founded in 2010, that provides telecommunications services to consumers and small businesses around Australia. Competing with the likes of Telstra, Optus, iiNet, Dodo and Internode. ClubTelco's is owned by Vocus Group, a publicly listed company on the Australian Securities Exchange. ClubTelco was formally closed on the 21st of July 2020. Before its closure, ClubTelco served over 120,000 customers.

In the summer of 2011, the company merged with Eftel in a reverse takeover, beginning what was expected to be a significant round of consolidation in the Australian ISP industry.

Following the acquisition of Eftel by M2 Group in 2013, ClubTelco operated as a subsidiary brand of M2, until M2 itself merged with Vocus Group on 5 February 2016.
