= Vaughan Bowen =

Australian businessman

Vaughan Garfield Bowen
- Born: Vaughan Garfield Bowen; 14 December 1972 (age 53); Australia
- Education: Bachelor of Commerce, University of New South Wales
- Height: 201 cm (6 ft 7 in)

Vaughan Garfield Bowen (born 14 December 1972 in Australia) is an Australian businessman. He is the founder and former executive director of M2 Telecommunications, an Australian telecommunications company.

== Career ==
Prior to founding M2 Telecommunications, Bowen spent several years managing and profitably growing the South East Asian operations of Secure Parking, one of the region's largest facilities management companies.

He is a member of the Australian Institute of Company Directors and was named as a finalist in the Entrepreneur of the Year Southern Region 2004 and 2009. In 2012, Bowen received the ACOMMS Communications Ambassador award.

On 29 August 2011, Bowen announced his intention to transition into an executive director role within M2, following 12 years leading the company. The transition took place at the conclusion of M2's Annual General Meeting on 28 October 2011. In that same year, Bowen founded and became Chairman of the Telco Together Foundation, a not-for-profit charitable foundation.

After the merger of M2 Telecommunications with Vocus Group, Bowen continued on as executive director of the merged business. During this period the company had multiple profit downgrades and the share price dropped from $9.29 to $2.45. Bowen took over as chairman of the combined business in October 2017 and the company subsequently downgraded earnings again in February 2018. Bowen resigned from the role of chairman after five months in the role.

On 14 September 2021, Bowen was charged with two counts of insider trading. The corporate regulator alleged he offloaded around 5.6 million shares in Vocus with inside knowledge that private equity firm EQT would withdraw its $3.3 billion takeover tilt for the once-troubled telco. Bowen denied the charges, each of which carries a maximum penalty of 15 years in prison. On 15 March 2022, the matter was listed for a committal hearing to commence on 28 November 2022, for five days.

On the 13th of December, 2024, following a trial lasting for five weeks, Bowen was unanimously acquitted of all charges by a jury of his peers.

== Personal life ==
Bowen enjoys running in half marathons, and is a lifelong friend of Australian Senator Cory Bernardi.
