= Dodo Services =

Australian telecommunications and energy retailer

Dodo Services Pty Ltd
- Trade name: Dodo
- Type: Subsidiary
- Industry: Internet service provider
- Founded: September 2001
- Founder: Larry Kestelman, Michael Slepoy
- Area served: Australia
- Products: Broadband internet, mobile phone plans, electricity and (limited) gas retail
- Parent: Vocus Group
- Website: www.dodo.com

Dodo Services Pty Ltd is an Australian Internet service and mobile telephone provider that is based in Melbourne and is a fully owned subsidiary of the Vocus Group (ASX: VOC).

== History ==
The company was established in September 2001. Dodo expanded services which include mobile broadband, VoIP, home and car insurance, gas and electricity.

In 2013, the company was acquired by M2 Group. Prior to being bought out, the company had over 400,000 customers and 660,000 active services. M2 paid $203.90 million for Dodo and $44.10 million for Eftel as some of the owners owned both companies. It runs on the Optus network.
