= M2 Group =

Former Australian retailer

M2 Group Ltd
- Type: Public
- Traded as: ASX: MTU
- ISIN: AU000000MTU6
- Industry: Telecommunications
- Founded: 1999 by Vaughan Bowen
- Defunct: February 5, 2016
- Fate: Merged with Vocus Communications
- Headquarters: Melbourne, Australia
- Area served: Australia, New Zealand
- Key people: Geoff Horth (Chief Executive Officer) Scott Carter (Chief Operating Officer) Darryl Inns (Chief Financial Officer)
- Products: Wholesale & Retail Telecommunications, Power and Gas, Insurance
- Revenue: ▲ A$1.12 billion (FY15)
- Number of employees: 3300 FTE (2015)
- Website: www.m2.com.au

M2 Group Ltd was an Australian retailer and wholesaler of telecommunications services as well as power, gas and insurance products.

On 5 February 2016, M2 Group Ltd merged with Vocus Communications.

== History ==
Established in 1999, M2 Group Ltd (“M2”, ASX: MTU) was a provider of a range of communication, utility and insurance services to Australian households and small businesses. Headquartered in Melbourne, M2 had more than 3000 employees in Australia, New Zealand and the Philippines. At M2's 2013 Annual General Meeting, shareholders voted to change the company's name from M2 Telecommunications Group Ltd to M2 Group Ltd.

M2's business segment included the Commander and Engin brands, offering a suite of traditional and managed voice and data services and equipment.

== Consumer division ==
The consumer segment, under the brands of Dodo and iPrimus, offered Australian consumers telecommunications services, energy and insurance

== Wholesale division ==
Through the M2 Wholesale division, the firm provides wholesale fixed line, mobile and data telecommunications services to small and medium-sized telecommunications service providers and Internet Service Providers.

M2 was named by BRW Magazine as one of Australia's 100 fastest-growing companies five times between 2003 - 2008, and in the Deloitte Technology Fast 50 eight times between 2004 and 2013.

== Acquisitions ==
The company had made several acquisitions, and maintained a diverse portfolio of brands across a range of market segments.

- In 2005, it acquired Protel Communications, a small provider of broadband and telephony services.
- In 2007, it acquired Wholesale Communications Group, Tenex, Southern Cross Telecommunications and Orion Telecommunications.
- In 2008, it acquired Unitel Pty Ltd and agreed to purchase People Telecom.
- In 2009, M2 acquired selected strategic assets of Commander Communications.
- In 2012, M2 acquired Primus Telecommunications for $192 million.
- In 2013, the company announced its planned acquisition of Dodo for $204 million, and Eftel (which included the aaNet, Engin and ClubTelco brands) for $44 million.
- In 2015, M2 acquired CallPlus and 2Talk for NZD$250 Million.

== Merger ==
On 28 September 2015, it was reported that M2 Group and Vocus Communications would merge to create the 3rd largest and 4th largest telecom company in New Zealand and Australia respectively. The resulting company was estimated to be worth US$1.4 billion. After the completion of the merger, M2 CEO Geoff Horth will remain the Chief Executive of the successor group and M2 shareholders will gain a 56% ownership of the new entity. As of 5 February 2016, M2 Group Ltd and Vocus Communications Limited obtained the final court approval to proceed with the merger of the two companies and now trades on the ASX under Vocus.
