= Telephone booths in New Zealand =

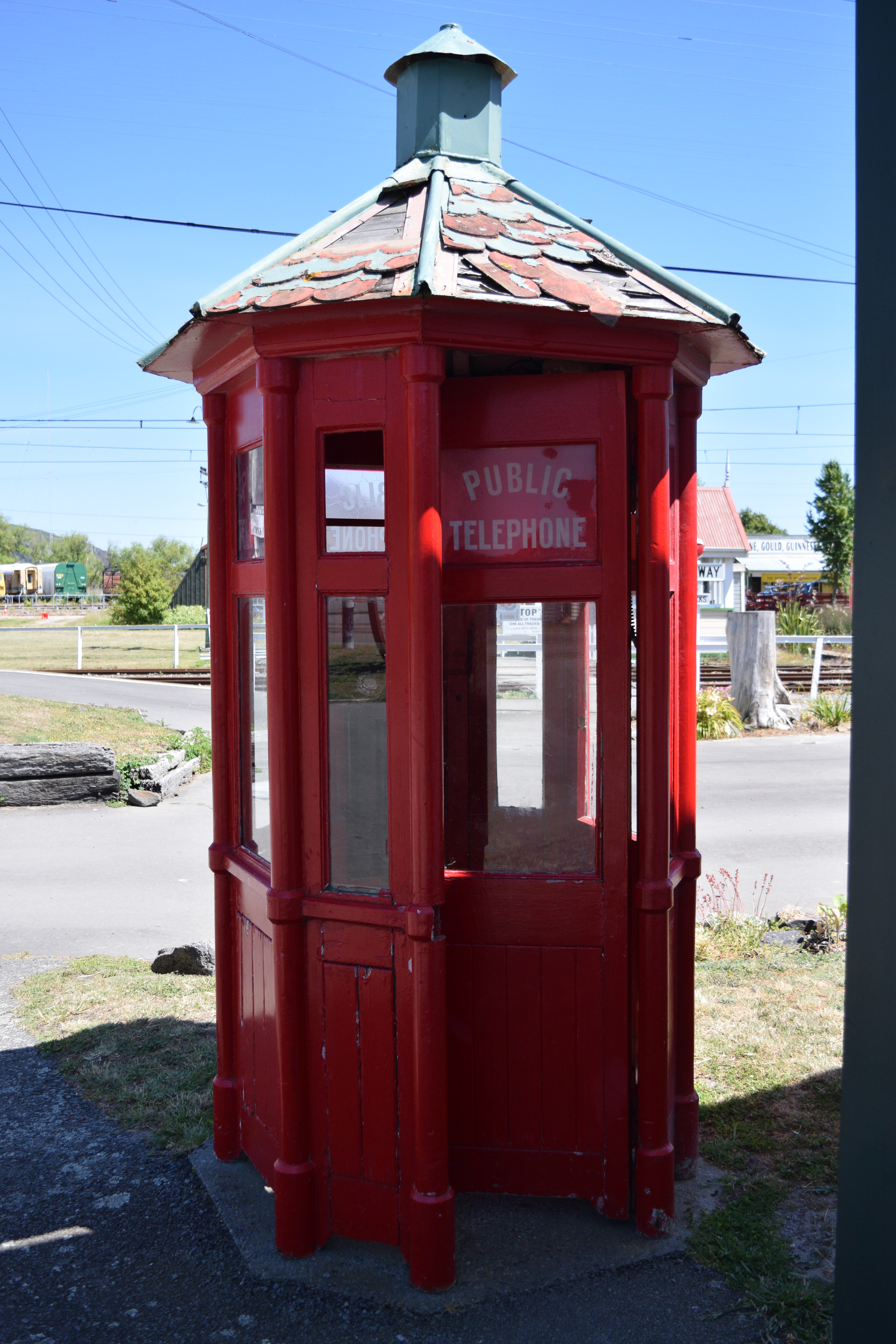
Early 20th century phone booth, Ferrymead Heritage Park

Telephone booths with coin-operated telephones for use by the public were introduced to New Zealand in 1910. By the 2020s they were not used as much, and the copper wiring system they used was being phased out. Telecommunications company Spark proposed to replace the remaining telephone booths with new ones equipped with wi-fi, cellphone charging and free phone calls.

== Early developments ==
Various experiments with the newly-invented telephone were held in New Zealand in 1878: for example, communication was established between Waipukurau and Napier, and between Dunedin and another location. In the early 1880s, the Post and Telegraph Department began introducing telephones for public use (called 'bureau stations') at shops and telephone exchanges around the country. On payment of a fee, a person could call anyone on the local exchange. By 1912, many post offices had a public telephone cabinet "covered with green baize and lighted by one little window". The Postmaster General at the time ordered that a new type of cabinet be introduced, with improved soundproofing and much better lighting and ventilation from glass walls.

== Public call stations ==
Street-side telephone boxes with coin-operated telephones were introduced from 1910, with the first coin-in-the-slot 'public call station' installed at Wellington. Frederick Palmer, an engineer with the Post and Telegraph Department, invented an "ingenious" automatic coin-in-the slot telephone which gained world-wide attention. Two pennies were put into the machine so that the telephone exchange could be called up. If the number was engaged, a mechanism returned the coins to the customer. By March 1926 there were 409 ‘public call offices’ or 'slot telephones' in operation. These were housed in wooden or concrete booths. The wooden booths were often octagonal, but hexagonal examples also existed. The concrete telephone booths introduced in the 1920s were made by the Hume Pipe Company. They were circular with a conical roof, similar to phone booths made by Hume in Australia and South Africa at that time.

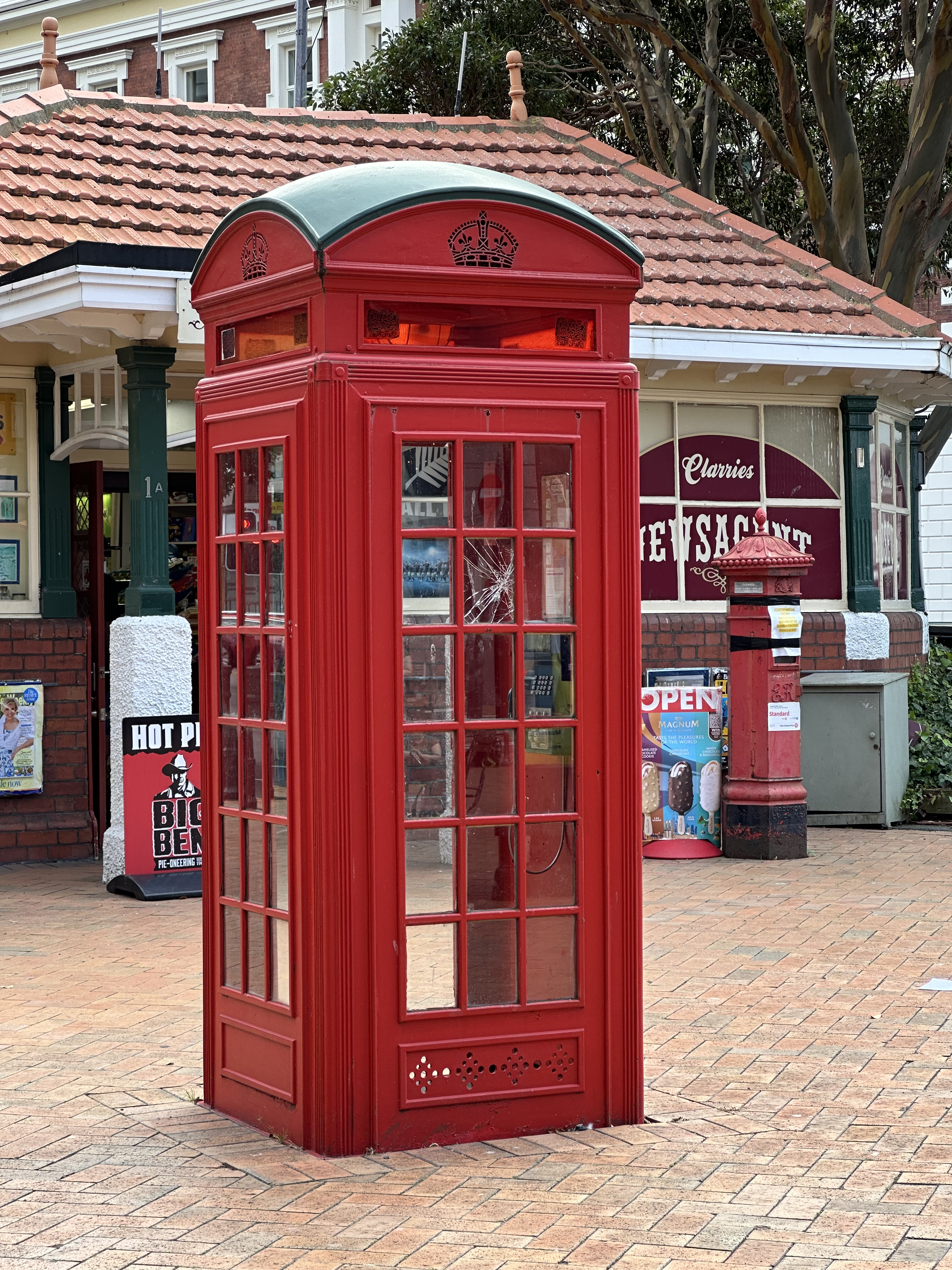
K2 telephone box at Post Office Square, Wellington

== K2 telephone boxes ==
In 1927 the Government announced that it would begin importing British-made cast-iron kiosks designed by architect Sir Giles Scott. The kiosk was made in sections that were bolted together, with perforations at the top and bottom of the iron panels to provide ventilation. There was a light inside which illuminated glass panels under the domed top with the word 'Telephone' in blue letters. The kiosk had a glazed wooden door. K2 (for "kiosk 2") telephone booths were expensive to produce, and manufacture ceased around 1936.

As of 2012 there was a K2 telephone box in Wellington's Post Office Square, and another in Christchurch's Victoria Square.

== Mid-20th century ==
The first multi-coin slot telephone was installed at Christchurch in October 1938. These were useful for making toll calls. After K2 telephone boxes stopped being imported, new wooden telephone booths were built locally, usually in a square shape. The Post Office also had a policy of designing special telephone boxes, such as double units, for particular sites such as tourist destinations and national parks.

The number of public call stations reached 5381 in 1977 and then began to decline as more people installed telephones in their homes.

In 1973, the Post Office installed new phone boxes at Cathedral Square in Christchurch. These were aluminium with "armour-plated windows" to minimise vandalism.

== 1980s–2000 ==
In 1988 Telecom took over management of the phone network from the New Zealand Post Office. They made the decision to repaint all existing telephone boxes in a pale blue to align with their new branding. Their ultimate goal was to replace all phone boxes with a more modern steel and glass design. The Wizard of New Zealand took exception to these plans and began "The Telephone Box War" — he and his supporters, including Alf's Imperial Army, began a guerrilla campaign to repaint the boxes back to red. The K2 box in Victoria Square was the second to be repainted to red in the "war". Ultimately Telecom reversed its decision after a survey showed majority support for keeping the boxes red, and the city council provided the Wizard with free red paint to restore the phone boxes that had been altered.

In April 1989, Telecom announced that it intended to replace 8000 phone boxes with a new model. The fifty-year old AB style payphones were replaced with phones that used phonecards as payment. In July 1989, Telecom announced that it had awarded a contract to provide the new telephone boxes to a British firm. The decision was controversial, but Telecom stated that local designs were not satisfactory. In 1992 it was revealed that the new British stainless steel and glass phone boxes (the KX model) had a rust problem and Telecom was negotiating with the British manufacturers to solve the issue.

The old red wooden phone boxes removed from service were auctioned off for charity and repurposed in various ways by those who bought them.

Telecom/Spark phone booths

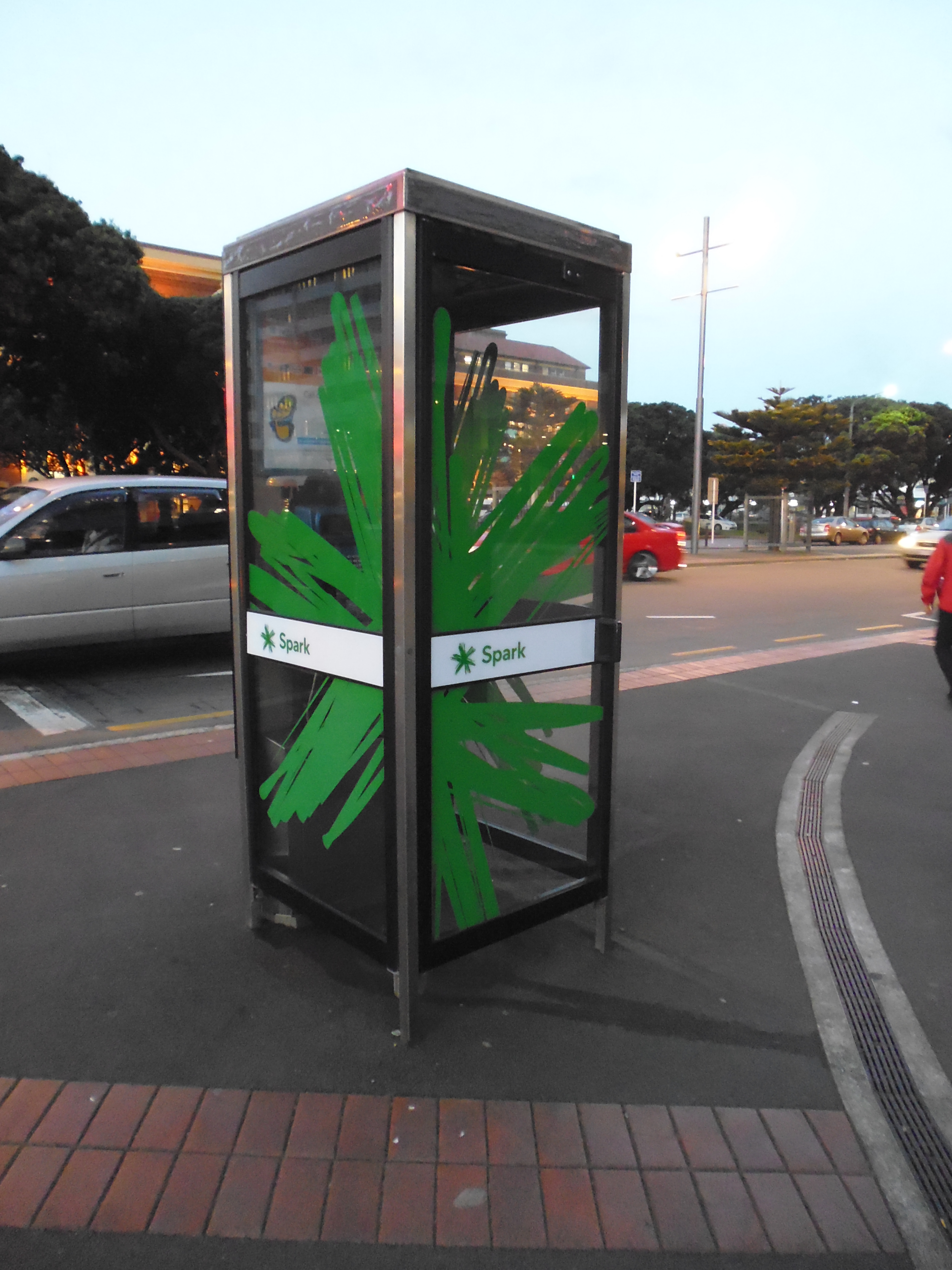

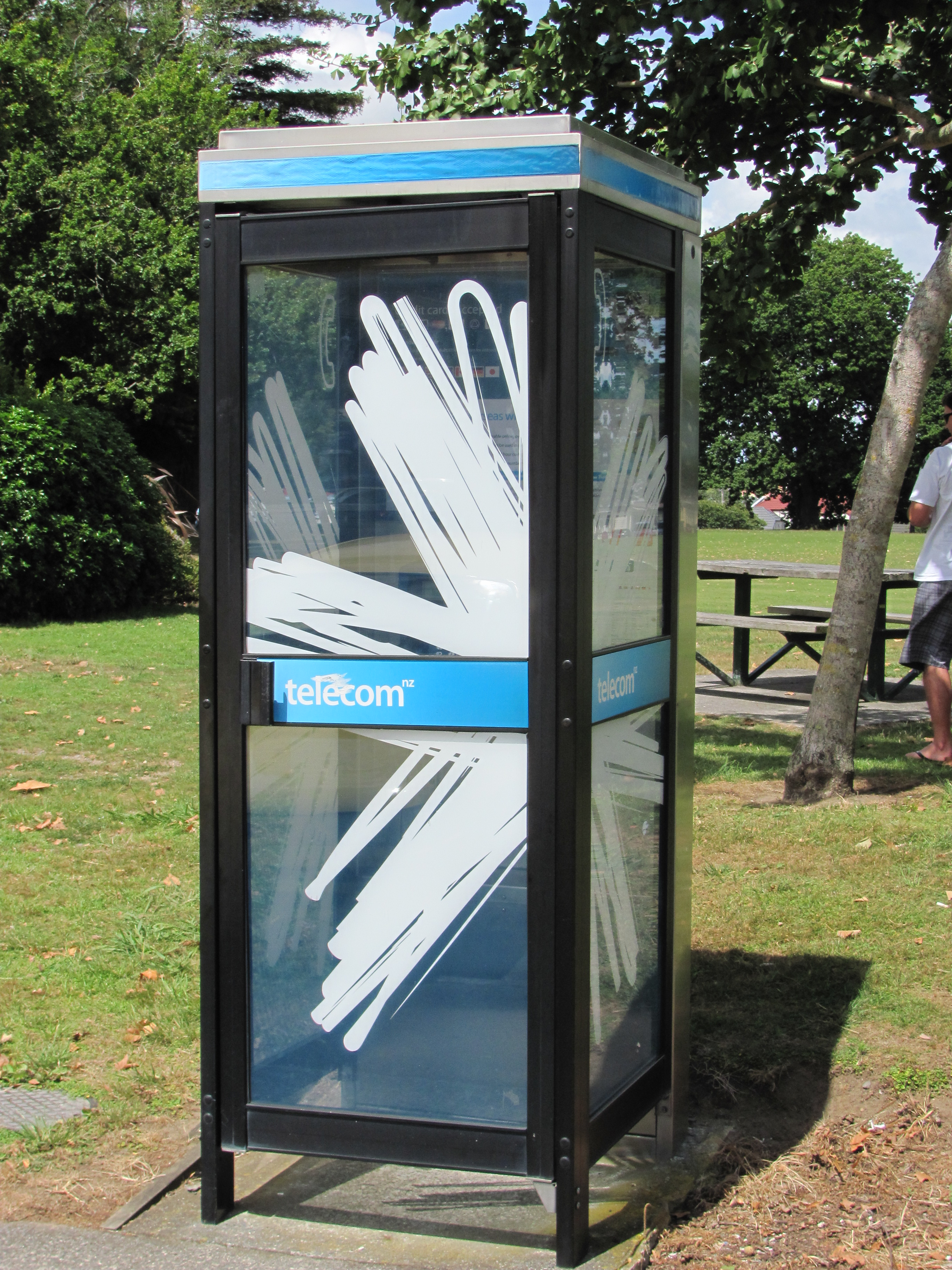

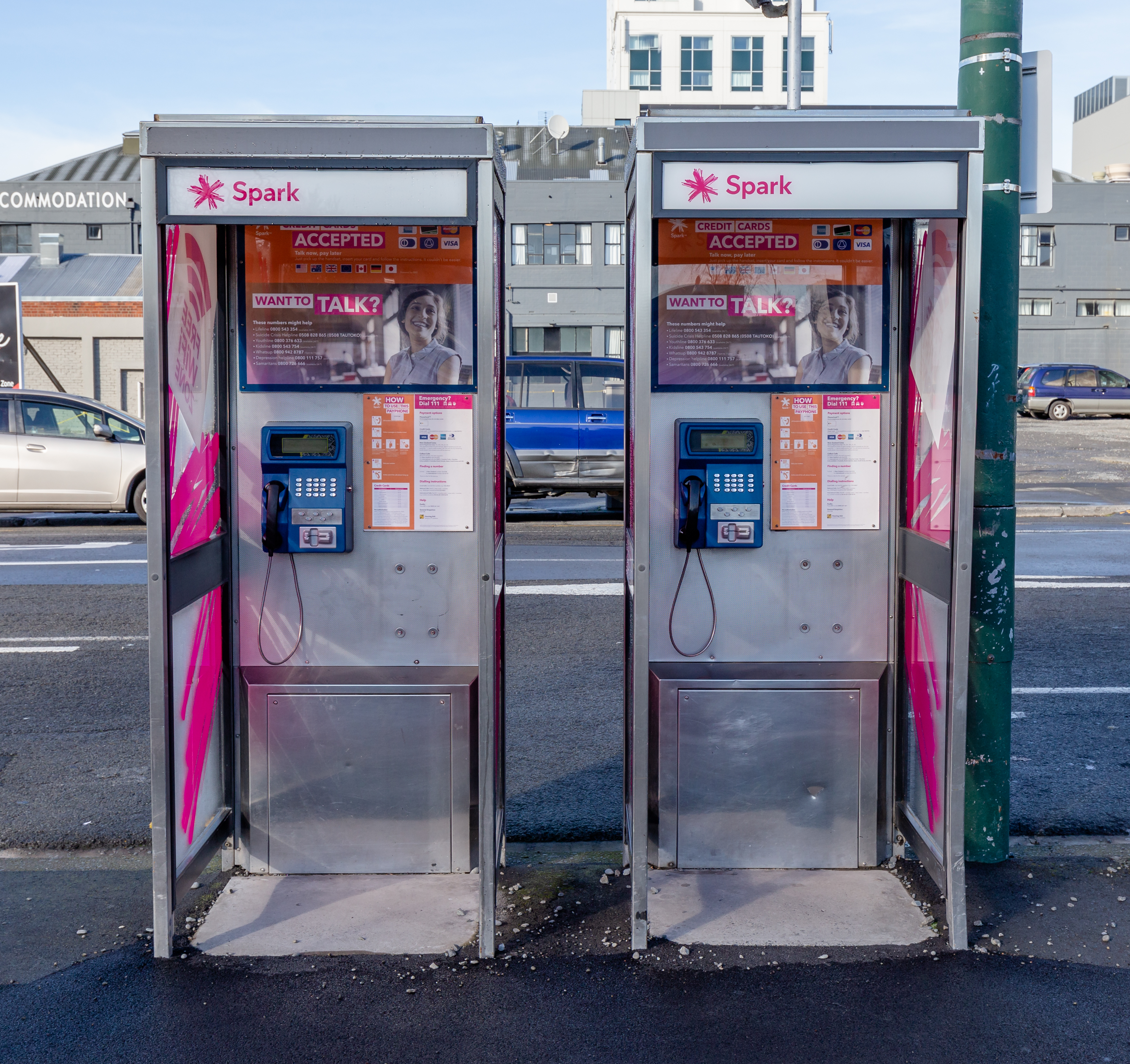

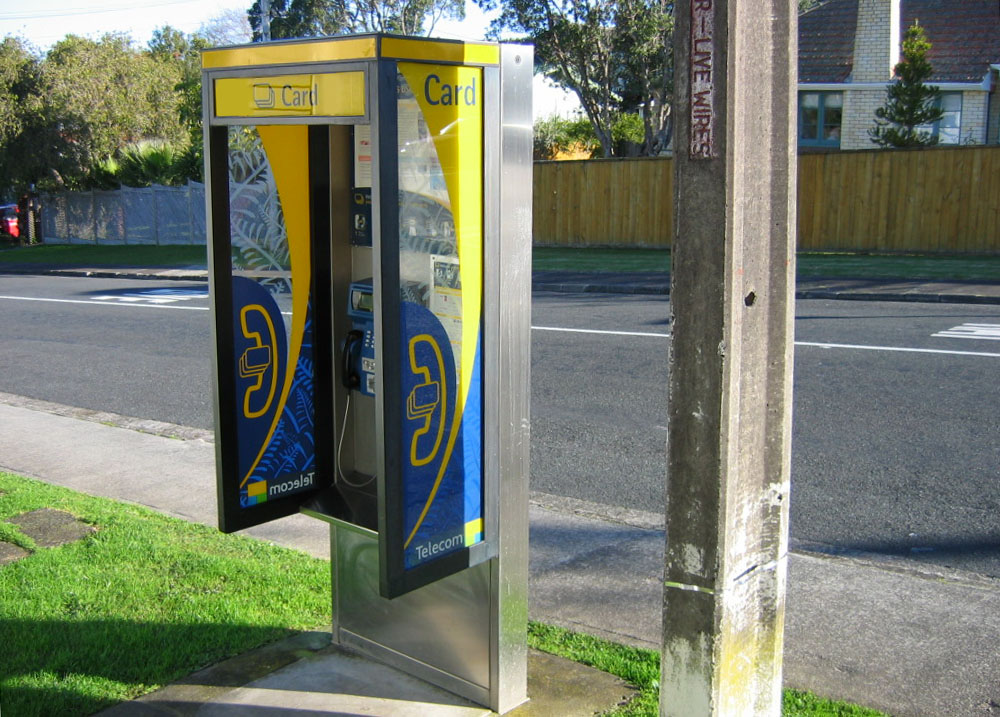

== 2000–present ==
In 2013, Telecom (renamed Spark in 2014) upgraded many phone boxes to include wi-fi hot-spotting. These were mainly located in Auckland, Wellington, Christchurch and major holiday areas, and the wifi was free for Telecom Mobile customers.

Corresponding with a rise in private cell phone ownership, use of public telephone boxes declined by almost 70% between 2018 and 2022. Around 90% of phone booths were used for an average of under three minutes per day. In 2022, Spark stated that there were about 2000 phone boxes still in operation throughout New Zealand. Around 750 of these were equipped with high-speed wi-fi with a 50-metre radius of reception. Most calls from public phone boxes in 2022 were to 0800 numbers, and toll calls were the second most common call type. Spark stated that the copper wiring and telephones were at the end of their life, and that it had no obligation to provide public call boxes. It intended to remove most public call boxes but would replace some with a modern alternative.

In June 2026, Spark stated that its 'Tūhono Connect' plan to replace around 2000 existing public phone boxes with 400 booths (including 150 in Auckland) equipped with free calling, wi-fi and phone charging was under threat because it could not reach an agreement with Auckland Council. The plan was estimated to cost $50 million, but Spark receives no government funding for public phone boxes. In order to fund the new phone boxes, it proposed to put digital advertising on the booths in a partnership with Ooh! Media, but as of June 2026 Auckland Council would not allow digital billboards on footpaths. Without approval to install 150 booths in Auckland, it was not feasible to install booths elsewhere.

In October 2026, Spark announced that it would not go ahead with its upgrade proposal and said that it would begin removing its remaining 212 functioning phone booths.

== France Telecom telephone booth ==
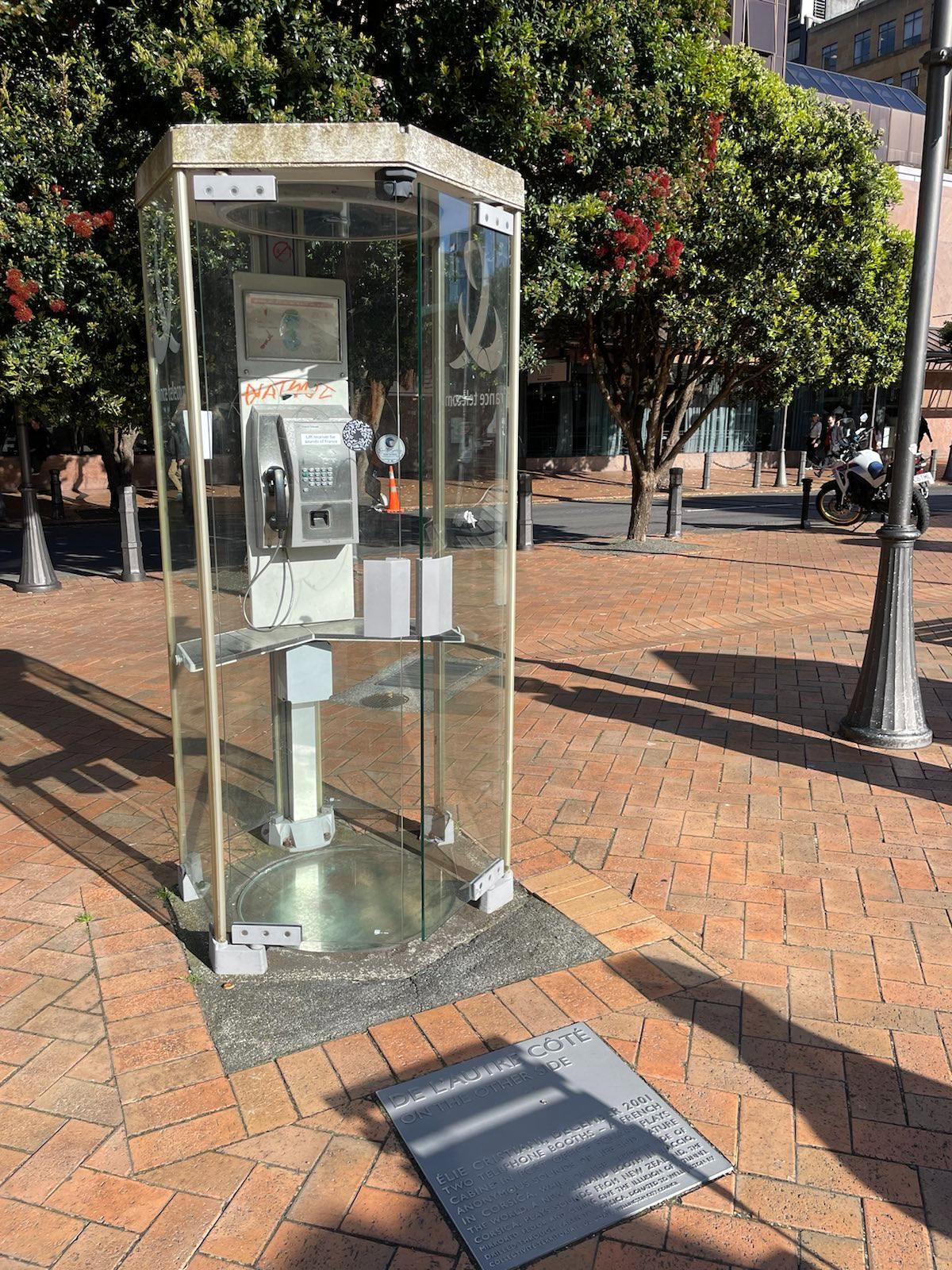
The France Telecom phone booth in 2008

Post Office Square has a France Telecom phone booth, made of clear glass. It is not a real telephone booth, but rather an art piece made by Elie Christiani, from the French island of Corsica. The phone booth plays sounds from Corsica, including music and playing children. Mirrors in the booth's floor and ceiling give the appearance that it is connected by tunnel to Corsica, which is almost Wellington's antipode. There is also a New Zealand phone booth in Corsica, which plays sounds from New Zealand. The phone booths were activated in late 2001, after a being inactive for a few months due to concerns by New Zealand authorities that some Corsican sounds were too inappropriate. The France Telecom phone booth was initially expected to be operational for a few months.

== Works cited ==
- Rice, Geoffrey (2014). Victoria Square: Cradle of Christchurch. Christchurch: Canterbury University Press. ISBN 978-1927145586.
