= List of dialling codes in New Zealand =

Country code: 64
International call prefix: 00
Trunk prefix: 0

New Zealand's telephone numbering plan divides the country into a large number of local calling areas. Calling a destination in another local calling area, requires the dialing of the trunk prefix followed by the area code and the local telephone number.

== Area code xxx.003 ==
Local calling area	Included towns	Numbers begin withxxx.00
Akaroa	Duvauchelle	3045
Akaroa	Akaroa	3047, 3048
Alexandra	Alexandra	4400, 4404, 4405, 447, 448, 449
Amberley	Scargill	3143
Amberley	Hawarden	3144
Amberley	Omihi	3145
Amberley	Waipara	3146
Amberley	Amberley	3148, 3149
Ashburton	Ashburton - general	261, 307, 423, 424, 550, 745, 908, 928, 975
Ashburton	Dorie	3020
Ashburton	Highbank	3021
Ashburton	Chertsey	3022
Ashburton	Wakanui	3023
Ashburton	Winchmore	3024
Ashburton	Westerfield	3025
Ashburton	Willowby	3026
Ashburton	Rakaia	3027
Ashburton	Methven	3028, 3029
Ashburton	Springburn	3030
Ashburton	Mayfield	3036
Ashburton	Hinds	3037
Ashburton	Mount Somers	3039
Ashburton	Ashburton	308
Balclutha	Balclutha, Clinton, Kaitangata, Owaka	412, 413, 415, 418, 419
Blenheim	Blenheim, Havelock, Marlborough Sounds (excluding D'Urville Island & Rai Valley), Picton, Renwick, Seddon, Wairau Valley, Ward	2426, 2446, 2654, 2668, 2730, 2889, 3941, 520, 5547, 570, 579, 653, 6599, 6618, 6998, 7451, 7771, 921, 9273, 9284, 9293, 9720, 9721, 9722, 9723, 9724, 984, 9868, 9869
Blenheim	Renwick	572
Blenheim	Picton	573
Blenheim	Havelock	574
Blenheim	Seddon, Ward	575
Blenheim	Blenheim	577, 578
Cheviot	Parnassus	3192
Cheviot	Cheviot	3198
Christchurch	Christchurch - general	2440, 2441, 2442, 2443, 2663, 320, 321, 328, 329, 331, 336, 339, 340, 341, 343, 345, 346, 350, 353, 354, 356, 357, 360, 361, 362, 363, 367, 368, 370, 371, 372, 373, 374, 375, 376, 377, 378, 379, 380, 381, 386, 387, 5951, 5952, 5953, 5954, 666, 924, 930, 940, 941, 960, 961, 962, 963, 964, 968, 977, 978, 979, 980, 981, 982, 983
Christchurch	Halswell	3227, 3228, 3229
Christchurch	Belfast	3237, 3238
Christchurch	Southbridge	3242
Christchurch	Leeston	3243
Christchurch	Little River	3251
Christchurch	Lincoln	3252, 3253
Christchurch	Dunsandel	3254
Christchurch	Greenpark	3255
Christchurch	Sumner	326
Christchurch	Kaiapoi	327
Christchurch	Lyttelton	328
Christchurch	Ataahua	3290
Christchurch	Irwell	3291
Christchurch	Diamond Harbour	3294
Christchurch	Springston	3295
Christchurch	Tai Tapu	3296
Christchurch	Motukaraka	3297
Christchurch	Spencerville	3298
Christchurch	Governors Bay	3299
Christchurch	Beckenham	332, 337
Christchurch	Hillmorton	335, 338
Christchurch	Avonhead	342
Christchurch	Riccarton	343, 348
Christchurch	Rolleston	344, 347 (except 3476)
Christchurch	Burnham	3476
Christchurch	Islington	349
Christchurch	Fendalton	351
Christchurch	Papanui	352, 354
Christchurch	St Albans	355
Christchurch	Memorial Avenue	358
Christchurch	Harewood	359, 360
Christchurch	Christchurch Central	365, 366, 377, 379
Christchurch	University of Canterbury	369
Christchurch	New Brighton	382, 388
Christchurch	Burwood	383
Christchurch	Mount Pleasant	384
Christchurch	Shirley	385
Christchurch	Linwood	389
Cromwell	Cromwell	4401, 445
Culverden	Waiau	3156
Culverden	Hanmer Springs	3157
Culverden	Culverden	3158
Darfield	Hororata	3180
Darfield	Kirwee	3181
Darfield	Glentunnel	3182
Darfield	Sheffield	3183
Darfield	Springfield	3184
Darfield	Lake Coleridge	3185
Darfield	Glenroy	3186
Darfield	Darfield	3187, 3188, 3189
Dunedin	Dunedin - general	425, 456, 457, 466, 468, 469, 470, 475, 484, 552, 929, 949, 950, 951, 955, 974
Dunedin	Mornington	453
Dunedin	Andersons Bay	454
Dunedin	South Dunedin	455
Dunedin	Middlemarch	4643
Dunedin	Maori Hill	4640, 4667, 4672, 4675
Dunedin	Ravensbourne	4710
Dunedin	Port Chalmers	472
Dunedin	North East Valley	473
Dunedin	Dunedin Central	474, 477, 479
Dunedin	Macandrew Bay	4761
Dunedin	Halfway Bush	4762, 4763, 4764, 4767
Dunedin	Portobello	4781
Dunedin	Brighton	4811, 4817
Dunedin	Waitati	4822
Dunedin	Outram	4861
Dunedin	Waipori Falls	4864
Dunedin	St Clair	487
Dunedin	Green Island	488
Dunedin	Mosgiel	489
Edendale	Edendale - general	2639, 2755, 2806, 2997, 3996, 4225, 5540, 6586, 6653, 7479, 9028, 9316, 9458, 9734
Edendale	Wyndham	2064
Edendale	Edendale	2066
Fairlie	Fairlie	680, 685
Fox Glacier		751
Franz Josef		752
Geraldine	Woodbury	6922
Geraldine	Geraldine	6938, 6939
Geraldine	Arundel	6963
Geraldine	Hilton	6974
Gore	Gore - general	200, 209, 2631, 2756, 2803, 2992, 3997, 4222, 5545, 5686, 6587, 6649, 7480, 9004, 9020, 9317, 9452, 9371
Gore	Balfour	2016
Gore	Riversdale	2025
Gore	Mataura	203
Gore	Dubrobin	2040
Gore	Heriot	2042
Gore	Tapanui	2048
Gore	Pukerau	2053
Gore	Waipahi	2058
Gore	Willowbank	2071
Gore	Waikoikoi	2076
Gore	Gore	208
Greymouth	Greymouth - general	769
Greymouth	Barrytown	7311
Greymouth	Ahaura	7323
Greymouth	Ngahere	7324
Greymouth	Reefton	7328
Greymouth	Kumara	7369
Greymouth	Otira	7382
Greymouth	Dobson	7625
Greymouth	Paroa	7626
Greymouth	Runanga	7627
Greymouth	Greymouth	768
Haast		750
Hokitika	Hokitika	753, 755, 756
Invercargill	Invercargill - general	211, 212
Invercargill	Otarata	213
Invercargill	Invercargill	214, 216, 217, 218
Invercargill	Waikiwi	215
Invercargill	Halfmoon Bay (Stewart Island)	2191
Invercargill	Ryal Bush	2217
Invercargill	Thornbury	2246
Invercargill	Kennington	2304
Invercargill	Hedgehope	2306
Invercargill	Woodlands	2313
Invercargill	Waianiwa	2352
Invercargill	Makarewa	2358
Invercargill	Kapuka	2395
Kaikoura	Kaikoura	3195, 3196
Kurow	Kurow	4360
Kurow	Otematata	4387
Kurow	Omarama	4389
Lawrence	Lawrence	4859
Lumsden	Dipton	2485
Lumsden	Mossburn	2486
Lumsden	Lumsden	2487
Lumsden	Garston	2488
Milton	Milton	417
Motueka	Motueka, Riwaka, Kaiteretere	526, 527, 528
Mount Cook		430, 4351
Murchison		523
Nelson	Nelson, Richmond, Tapawera, Brightwater, Dovedale, (Including D'Urville Island and Rai Valley)	521, 522, 529, 538, 539, 540, 541, 542, 543, 546, 549, 576
Nelson	Richmond	544
Nelson	Atawhai	545
Nelson	Stoke	547
Nelson	Nelson Central	548
Nelson	Rai Valley	571
Oamaru	Oamaru Central, Oamaru North, Maheno,	431, 432, 433, 439
Oamaru	Duntroon	4312
Oamaru	Hilderthorpe	4313
Oamaru	Peebles	4317
Oamaru	Enfield	4324
Oamaru	Windsor	4326
Oamaru	Oamaru	434
Oamaru	Oamaru North	437
Oamaru	Hampden	4394
Oamaru	Maheno	4395
Otautau	Otautau	225
Otautau	Ohai	2254
Otautau	Orawia	2255
Otautau	Nightcaps	2257
Otautau	Tuatapere	2266
Palmerston	Palmerston, Dunback, Waikouaiti	463, 465
Queenstown	Queenstown, Arrowtown	409, 428, 441, 442, 450, 451
Ranfurly	Ranfurly	444
Rangiora	Rangiora - general	310, 311
Rangiora	Oxford	3124
Rangiora	Cust	3125
Rangiora	Ohoka	3126
Rangiora	Woodend	3127
Rangiora	Loburn	3128
Rangiora	Sefton	3129
Rangiora	Rangiora	313
Riverton	Riverton, Orepuki	234
Roxburgh	Roxburgh, Millars Flat	446
Takaka	Collingwood	524
Takaka	Takaka	525
Te Anau	Te Anau	249
Te Anau	The Key	2495
Te Anau	Manapouri	2496
Timaru	Timaru, Temuka, Pleasant Point,	683, 684, 686, 687, 688
Timaru	St Andrews	6126
Timaru	Maungati	6129
Timaru	Cave	6143
Timaru	Pleasant Point	6147
Timaru	Temuka	615
Timaru	Timaru	684, 688
Timaru	Gleniti	686
Tokanui		246
Twizel		4350, 4353, 4359
Waitangi	Waitangi, Chatham Islands	305
Waimate		689, 690
Wanaka	Wanaka	443
Westport	Westport	782, 788, 789
Winton	Centre Bush	2630
Winton	Winton	2361, 2367, 2368, 2369
Winton	Drummond	2362
Winton	Browns	2364

== Area code 4 ==
Local calling area	Included towns	Numbers begin with
Wellington	Wellington, Upper Hutt, Lower Hutt, Porirua	46, 49, 57, 58, 61, 80, 97, 93
Wellington	Tawa	232
Wellington	Plimmerton	233
Wellington	Whitby	234
Wellington	Waitangirua	235
Wellington	Titahi Bay	236
Wellington	Porirua Central	237, 238
Wellington	Pukerua Bay	239
Wellington	Island Bay	383
Wellington	Courtenay Place	384, 385
Wellington	Hataitai	386
Wellington	Kilbirnie	387
Wellington	Miramar	388
Wellington	Newtown	389
Wellington	Wellington Central	471, 472, 473
Wellington	Kelburn	475
Wellington	Karori	476
Wellington	Johnsonville	477, 478
Wellington	Ngaio, Khandallah	479
Wellington	Upper Hutt North	526
Wellington	Upper Hutt South	528
Wellington	Eastbourne	562
Wellington	Stokes Valley	563
Wellington	Wainuiomata	564
Wellington	Kelson	565
Wellington	Lower Hutt Central	566
Wellington	Naenae	567
Wellington	Petone	568
Kapiti	Paraparaumu, Paekakariki, Waikanae	29, 90

== Area code 6 ==
Local calling area	Included urban areas	Numbers begin with
Bulls	Bulls, Sanson	3220, 3221, 3222, 3293
Dannevirke	Dannevirke	374
Featherston	Greytown	304
Featherston	Martinborough	306
Featherston	Featherston	308
Hawera	Normanby	272
Hawera	Patea	273
Hawera	Manaia	274
Hawera	Hawera	278
Napier/Hastings	Tutira, Hastings, Taradale, Napier, Havelock North	830, 831, 833, 834, 835, 836, 839, 842, 843, 845, 870, 871, 872, 873, 874, 875, 876, 878
Napier/Hastings	Taradale	844
Napier/Hastings	Havelock North	877
Napier/Hastings	Flaxmere	879
Gisborne	Gisborne - general	861, 864, 865, 869
Gisborne	Whatatutu	8621
Gisborne	Whangara	8622
Gisborne	Te Karaka	8623
Gisborne	Matawai	8624
Gisborne	Ormond	8625
Gisborne	Tolaga Bay	8626
Gisborne	Patutahi	8627
Gisborne	Manutuke	8628
Gisborne	Motu	8635
Gisborne	Hangaroa	8637
Gisborne	Ngatapa	8639
Gisborne	Gisborne	867, 868
Levin	Levin, Waitārere Beach, Foxton, Ōtaki, Shannon	362, 366, 367
Levin	Foxton	363
Levin	Otaki, Otaki Beach	364
Levin	Levin	368
Marton	Marton, Hunterville, Ohangaiti	321, 322, 327
Masterton	Masterton	370, 372, 377, 378, 929, 946
Masterton	Carterton	379
Mokau		750, 7525, 7529
New Plymouth	New Plymouth	751, 752 (except 7525 and 7529), 753, 757, 758, 759, 766, 768, 769
New Plymouth	Waitara	754
New Plymouth	Bell Block	755
New Plymouth	Inglewood	756
Ohakune	Ohakune, Raetihi	385
Opunake		761, 763
Pahiatua	Pahiatua, Eketahuna, Woodville	375, 376
Palmerston North	Palmerston North, Ashhurst, Feilding, Tokomaru	324, 325, 328, 329, 350, 351, 352, 353, 354, 355, 356, 357, 358, 359, 929, 951, 952, 953, 954
Palmerston North	Feilding	323
Palmerston North	Ashhurst	326
Ruatoria	Tikitiki	8643
Ruatoria	Te Araroa	8644
Ruatoria	Tokomaru Bay	8645
Ruatoria	Te Puia Springs	8646
Ruatoria	Ruatoria	8648
Stratford	Eltham, Stratford	762, 764, 765
Taihape	Taihape, Mangaweka	382, 388
Waiouru	Waiouru	387
Waipukurau		855, 856, 857, 858
Wairoa		837, 838
Whanganui	Whanganui - general	213, 347, 348, 349, 965
Whanganui	Brunswick	3421
Whanganui	Mangamahu	3422
Whanganui	Maxwell	3423
Whanganui	Okoia	3424
Whanganui	Makirikiri	3425
Whanganui	Whangaehu	3426
Whanganui	Fordell	3427
Whanganui	Kai Iwi	3429
Whanganui	Whanganui	343, 344, 345
Whanganui	Waverley	346

== Area code 7 ==
Local calling area	Included urban areas	Numbers begin with
Hamilton	Hamilton, Cambridge, Raglan, Ngāruawāhia	211, 280, 560, 823, 824, 825, 827, 83, 85, 957, 849,855, 843
Hamilton	Cambridge	827
Hamilton	Melville	843
Hamilton	Frankton	847
Hamilton	Te Rapa	849
Huntly	Te Kauwhata	826
Huntly	Huntly	828
Matamata	Wardville	8880
Matamata	Hinuera	8881
Matamata	Te Poi	8882
Matamata	Walton	8883
Matamata	Matamata	8885, 8886, 8887, 8888
Morrinsville / Te Aroha	Elstow	8845
Morrinsville / Te Aroha	Manawaru	8846
Morrinsville / Te Aroha	Te Aroha	8847, 8848, 8849
Morrinsville / Te Aroha	Waitoa	8871
Morrinsville / Te Aroha	Springdale	8872
Morrinsville / Te Aroha	Ngarua	8873
Morrinsville / Te Aroha	Kiwitahi	8874
Morrinsville / Te Aroha	Tahuna	8875
Morrinsville / Te Aroha	Tauhei	8876
Morrinsville / Te Aroha	Hoe-o-Tainui	8877
Morrinsville / Te Aroha	Patetonga	8878
Morrinsville / Te Aroha	Morrinsville	8893, 8895, 8896, 8897
Opotiki	Opotiki	315, 325
Otorohanga	Otorohanga	873
Paeroa	Netherton	8623
Paeroa	Hikutaia	8624
Paeroa	Paeroa	8626, 8627, 8628
Rotorua	Rotorua, Kaingaroa Forest, Mamaku	282, 33, 36, 46
Rotorua	Reporoa	333
Rotorua	Lynmore	345
Rotorua	Rotorua Central	347, 348, 349
Rotorua	Ngongotaha	357
Rotorua	Okere Falls, Rotoiti	362
Rotorua	Murupara	366
Taumarunui	Taumarunui, National Park	895, 896
Taupo	Taupo, Turangi	3339, 37, 38
Taupo	Taupo	376, 378
Taupo	Turangi	386
Tauranga	Tauranga, Mount Maunganui	281, 55, 56, 92, 77
Tauranga	Papamoa	542
Tauranga	Pyes Pa	543
Tauranga	Welcome Bay	544
Tauranga	Omokoroa	548
Tauranga	Katikati	549
Tauranga	Te Puke	573
Tauranga	Mount Maunganui	575
Tauranga	Otumoetai	576
Tauranga	Tauranga Central	578
Te Awamutu	Te Awamutu, Pirongia, Kihikihi	870, 871, 872
Te Kuiti	Te Kuiti	876, 877, 878
Thames	Thames, Ngatea, Tairua, Pauanui, Whitianga	864, 866, 867, 868, 869
Tokoroa - Putaruru	Mangakino	8828
Tokoroa - Putaruru	Tirau	8831
Tokoroa - Putaruru	Waotu	8832
Tokoroa - Putaruru	Putaruru	8833, 8837, 8838
Tokoroa - Putaruru	Okoroire	8834
Tokoroa - Putaruru	Puketurua	8835
Tokoroa - Putaruru	Lichfield	8836
Tokoroa - Putaruru	Tokoroa	886
Waihi	Waihi Beach	8634, 8635
Waihi	Waihi	8636, 8637, 8638
Whakatane	Whakatane, Kawerau	281, 307, 312, 922
Whakatane	Edgecumbe	304
Whakatane	Whakatane	308
Whakatane	Kawerau	323
Whangamata	Whangamata	865

== Area code 9 ==
Local calling area	Code	Included urban areas	Numbers begin with
Auckland	AK	Auckland City	30, 33, 35, 36, 37
Auckland	AK	Grey Lynn, Herne Bay, Westmere	360, 361, 376, 378
Auckland	AK	Waiheke Island	372
Auckland	AK	Newmarket, Remuera	520, 522, 523, 524, 529
Auckland	AK	Kohimarama	502, 521, 528
Auckland	AK	Ellerslie, Penrose	525, 526, 571, 579, 580
Auckland	AK	Mt Wellington, Tamaki	527, 573, 574
Auckland	AK	Glendowie, Kohimarama, Meadowbank	528
Auckland	AK	Mt Roskill	620, 621, 629
Auckland	AK	Epsom, Mt Eden	623, 630, 631, 638, 639
Auckland	AK	Hillsborough, Mt Roskill, Royal Oak, Three Kings	624, 625
Auckland	AK	Blockhouse Bay	626, 627
Auckland	AK	Onehunga, One Tree Hill, Mangere Bridge	622, 633, 634, 636
Auckland	AK	Owairaka, Pt Chevalier	815, 845
Auckland	AK	Avondale	820, 828, 829
Auckland	AK	Mt Albert	846, 849
Auckland	AK	Waimauku	411
Auckland	AK	Riverhead, Kumeu	412
Auckland	AK	West Harbour, Whenuapai	416
Auckland	AK	Waitakere	810
Auckland	AK	Huia	811
Auckland	AK	Piha	812
Auckland	AK	Waiatarua	814
Auckland	AK	Titirangi	811, 816, 817
Auckland	AK	Glen Eden	813, 818
Auckland	AK	New Lynn	825, 826, 827
Auckland	AK	Massey	831, 832, 833
Auckland	AK	Te Atatū	834, 839
Auckland	AK	Glendene, Henderson	835, 836, 837, 838, 839
Auckland	AK	Manukau City	261, 262, 263
Auckland	AK	East Tamaki, Wiri	263
Auckland	AK	Weymouth, Manurewa	266, 267, 268, 269
Auckland	AK	East Tamaki, Otara	271, 272, 273, 274, 277, 278, 279
Auckland	AK	Māngere	255, 256, 275, 636
Auckland	AK	Otahuhu	259, 270, 276
Auckland	AK	Papatoetoe	277, 278, 279
Auckland	AK	Hunua, Takanini, Papakura, Drury	292, 293, 294, 296, 297, 298, 299
Auckland	AK	Forrest Hill	410
Auckland	AK	Greenhithe, Paremoremo	413
Auckland	AK	Albany	414, 415
Auckland	AK	Northcote, Birkenhead	418, 419, 480, 481
Auckland	AK	Glenfield	440, 442, 443, 444
Auckland	AK	Devonport	445, 446
Auckland	AK	Torbay	473
Auckland	AK	Mairangi Bay, Browns Bay	477, 478, 479
Auckland	AK	Northcote	480
Auckland	AK	Beachhaven, Birkdale	482, 483
Auckland	AK	Takapuna	486, 488, 489
Auckland	AK	Whitford	530
Auckland	AK	Highland Park, Howick	273, 274, 534, 535, 536, 537, 538
Auckland	AK	Maraetai, Beachlands	536
Auckland	AK	Panmure, Mt Wellington, Tamaki	527, 570, 573, 574
Auckland	AK	St Heliers, Glendowie	575
Auckland	AK	Pakuranga	570, 576, 577
Auckland	AK	Auckland - general/VOIP/non-geographical	21, 55, 91, 92, 94, 95, 96, 97, 980
Dargaville		Dargaville	439, 9015
Great Barrier Island		Great Barrier Island	429, 9049
Helensville		Helensville, Kaukapakapa	420, 9040
Hibiscus Coast		Orewa, Silverdale	421, 424, 426, 427, 428, 9044
Maungaturoto		Maungaturoto	4310, 4311, 4316, 4317, 4318, 9019
Kaikohe		Kaikohe, Kerikeri	401, 405, 407, 9017
Kaitaia		Kaitaia	408, 406, 409
Kawakawa		Kawakawa, Paihia	402, 403, 404, 9012
Pukekohe		Pukekohe, Tuakau, Waiuku	230, 234, 236, 237, 238, 239
Pukekohe		Waiuku	235
Warkworth		Warkworth, Wellsford	422, 4312, 4314, 4315, 902
Warkworth		Wellsford	423
Warkworth		Warkworth	425
Whangarei		Whangarei	430, 432, 433, 434, 436, 459, 470, 983, 986
Whangarei		Kamo	435
Whangarei		Kensington	437
Whangarei		Whangarei Central	438
