= ICONZ =

ICONZ - WEBVISIONS
- Type: Privately Held Company
- Industry: Telecommunications
- Founded: 1992
- Headquarters: Auckland, New Zealand
- Area served: New Zealand, Asia
- Key people: Caledonian Investments Ltd, Owner; Albert Wong, Group CEO; Andrew Wong, VP, Finance & Corporate Affairs; Chua Teck Joo, Chief Technology Officer; Kuah Sok Khim, Group Marketing Director
- Products: Cloud Computing, Co-location and Dedicated Server Hosting, Domain Registration, Web Hosting etc
- Number of employees: 200

The Internet Company of New Zealand Limited (otherwise known as ICONZ) is a New Zealand hosting and Internet service provider (ISP), and was a pioneer in providing internet connections to residential New Zealanders. Since then, ICONZ has expanded its product offering considerably. It now offers a broad range of IT services. This includes connectivity, cloud, business continuity, security, voice, colocation and managed services. ICONZ's competitors include Spark, Orcon, Vodafone New Zealand (previously ihug), and Datacom, as well as several mid-sized vendors.

ICONZ is now a part of the Webvisions Group of companies.

== History ==
In 1992 ICONZ was founded as a small business by Chris Thorpe and Jon Clarke in Clarke's garage. By 1994 ICONZ had grown and was one of only two companies providing internet solutions to the Auckland and far north regions of New Zealand, with 18 dial-up lines and a 48K MDDS circuit.

In 1995, ICONZ hosted auckland.nz.undernet.org IRC node setup, which was the significant step forward for New Zealand global communications. The Undernet is now one of the largest Internet Relay Chat (IRC) networks.

ICONZ was acquired by AsiaOnLine in 1999 and moved from being a New Zealand-based ISP to a Pacific-based ISP. The branding was changed to AsiaOnline, and it was given a new look. It joined a multinational company scattered around the Pacific Rim, with offices in California, Hong Kong, The Philippines, China, South Korea, India, Malaysia, Indonesia, Singapore, Australia, and New Zealand. AsiaOnline went into liquidation in November 2001, and the New Zealand portion was sold to the Spencer family, who reinstated the ICONZ branding.

Under the leadership of Michael Spencer, the operations acquired from AsiaOnline were merged with his existing ISP business, VISP and E3. The company centralised operations to ICONZ House in Airedale Street, Auckland. In 2003, ICONZ acquired New Plymouth-based WebFarm and Freeparking, leading shared-hosting providers in the New Zealand market. In 2005, ICONZ acquired 2day.com, a specialist Windows hosting company based in Auckland.

In 2006, the Spencer Family made a significant investment in the Pan-Asian hoster Webvisions, headquartered in Singapore. In 2012, ICONZ completed a 100% acquisition of Webvisions and both companies operated as one entity, i.e. ICONZ-Webvisions Pte Ltd.

On 1 September 2015 the NZ branch of ICONZ-Webvisions was re-branded to ICONZ Limited to separate itself from the Webvisions brand.

On 1 February 2016 ICONZ was bought by the New Zealand-based company Plan-B. Plan-B work with New Zealand and international businesses to provide assurance that their data, infrastructure, and ability to work are protected from unexpected events.

== See also ==
- ISPANZ
