= One NZ =

Telecommunications company in New Zealand

One New Zealand Group Limited
- Logo used since 2023
- Formerly: Vodafone New Zealand Ltd (1998–2023)
- Type: Subsidiary, partner market
- Industry: Telecommunications, mobile, Internet service provider
- Predecessor: BellSouth NZ; Vodafone NZ
- Founded: November 1998; 28 years ago
- Founder: BellSouth
- Headquarters: Auckland, New Zealand
- Area served: New Zealand
- Products: Prepaid mobile phones; Postpaid mobile phones; GSM, UMTS (3G), 4G LTE and 5G mobile networks; Internet; Cable internet; Fixed line; Retail
- Services: Fixed telephony; Mobile telephony; Internet access; MVNO; Telecommunications
- Number of employees: >3000
- Parent: Infratil (99.90%), Management team (0.10%)
- Website: one.nz

One New Zealand (formerly known as Vodafone New Zealand) is a New Zealand telecommunications company. One NZ is the largest wireless carrier in New Zealand, accounting for 38% of the country's mobile market in 2021.

== Corporate history ==
=== Vodafone New Zealand (1998–2023) ===
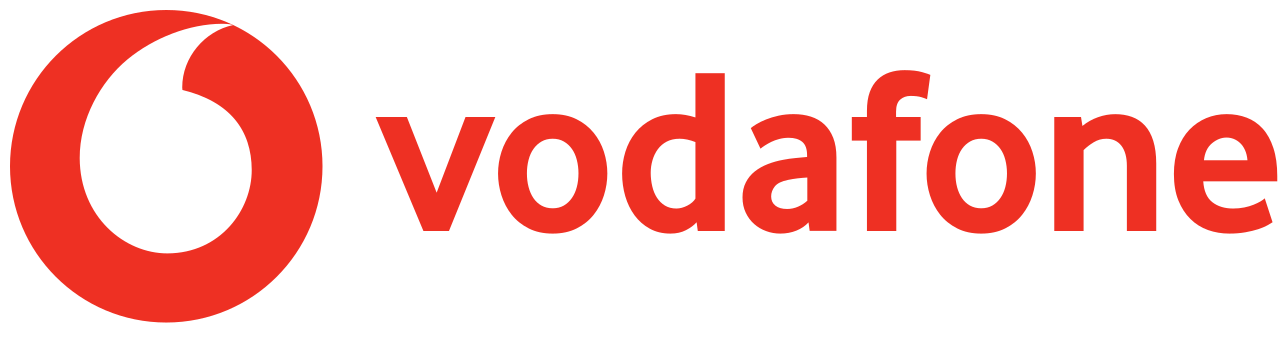
Final Vodafone logo, used from 2017 to 2023

One NZ is based in Auckland and was formed in 1998 as Vodafone New Zealand, after Vodafone purchased BellSouth's New Zealand operations. The company employs over 3,000 people and has operations nationwide, with its main offices based in Auckland, Wellington and Christchurch. The company is part of the New Zealand Telecommunications Forum.

In October 2006, Vodafone bought ihug, New Zealand's third largest Internet service provider (ISP) at the time, to provide internet services under the Vodafone name.

In 2012, Vodafone bought TelstraClear, making it New Zealand's second largest internet service provider.

In June 2016, Sky TV and Vodafone agreed to merge, with Sky TV purchasing 100% of Vodafone NZ operations for a cash payment of NZ$1.25 billion and issuing new shares to the Vodafone Group. Vodafone UK was to get a 51% stake in the company. However, the proposed merger was rejected by the Commerce Commission, resulting in a plunge in Sky TV's shares, and the proposed merger was not completed.

The company launched New Zealand's first 4G LTE network. In February 2013, Vodafone New Zealand launched New Zealand's first LTE mobile network which is currently available to 99% of the population. In June 2014, Vodafone New Zealand was ranked the fastest mobile network on the planet by speed-testing service Ookla. In December 2019, Vodafone New Zealand launched New Zealand's first 5G mobile network which by 2023 was available in more than 70 towns and cities across New Zealand.

It ceased to be a subsidiary of the London-listed company Vodafone Plc on 31 July 2019, when its sale to a consortium comprising Infratil Limited and Brookfield Asset Management Inc. was settled. The sold company would continue to use the Vodafone brand under a commercial arrangement with Vodafone plc.

In March 2022, Vodafone New Zealand was described as the best mobile network in New Zealand by umlaut. In August 2022, Vodafone New Zealand announced that from 31 August 2024, it would start to switch off their 3G mobile network to allow further expansion of the 4G/5G mobile network.

=== One NZ (2023–present) ===
In September 2022, it was announced that Vodafone New Zealand would change its name to One New Zealand in early 2023. Stuff News reported that the naming change could save the company between $20 million and $30 million that it would otherwise be paying in licensing fees. Vodafone NZ stated that customers' ability to roam on networks overseas will be unaffected by the name change.

Stuff published an article titled "Could Vodafone's rebrand to One New Zealand backfire?", stating that the naming change could be tarnished by the name's association with the defunct NZ political party One NZ. In response, the company's CEO Jason Paris said on Twitter "One NZ stands for the best of NZ (diversity, inclusion, trust, innovation etc)".

One NZ currently operates New Zealand's largest 5G mobile network. On 3 April 2023, Vodafone NZ announced their change to One NZ, while also announcing a deal with SpaceX to provide 100% mobile coverage through their Starlink satellite internet service, which was to be available in late 2024.

In May 2023, One NZ was described as the best mobile network in New Zealand by Umlaut.

In June 2023, Infratil announced that they would be taking full control of One NZ by buying out all shares from Brookfield Asset Management. This brought the Infratil ownership to 99.90%, making One NZ a New Zealand owned company. A small percentage of the company is owned by executives.

In August 2023, One NZ was fined over $3 million for breaching the Fair Trading Act by misleading consumers about their FibreX service, after One NZ incorrectly told people that FibreX was the only broadband service available at their location.

In May 2024, One NZ was described as the best mobile network in New Zealand by Umlaut.

In October 2024, One NZ received approval to test Starlink satellite-to-mobile SMS service. This came as the FCC voted unanimously in favor of its Supplemental Coverage from Space (SCS) regulatory framework on 14 March 2024.

In June 2025, One NZ was again awarded the best mobile network in New Zealand by Umlaut.

In June 2026, One NZ was again awarded the best mobile network in New Zealand by Umlaut.

== Market share ==
In December 2021, One NZ had 2.4 million customers. According to the Commerce Commission's Annual Telecommunications Monitoring Report in March 2022, One NZ's market share in the mobile market was 38%, Spark 41% and Two Degrees Mobile 19%. The remaining 2% of the market is made up of mobile virtual network operators.

== Acquisitions ==
=== BellSouth ===
BellSouth had 138,000 customers when it was purchased by Vodafone in November 1998. BellSouth's main rival was Telecom New Zealand (now Spark), New Zealand's second largest telecommunications company behind Vodafone. After Vodafone took over Bellsouth, it expanded network coverage to compete more effectively with Telecom.

=== ihug ===
On 11 October 2006, Vodafone acquired ihug from iiNet, and closed the ihug brand in 2008. ihug was a popular Internet Service Provider and was notable for introducing a flat rate account in 1995.

=== TelstraClear ===
On 31 October 2012, Vodafone acquired 100% of TelstraClear from Australian company Telstra. TelstraClear had its beginnings in New Zealand with Kiwi Cable, Clear Communications in 1990, and Telstra New Zealand in 1996.

Telstra NZ expanded its operations in the business market, bundling Telecom New Zealand services distributed as a reseller with its own network services. It maintained interconnect agreements with Telecom New Zealand, Clear Communications and some smaller service providers. In 1999 Saturn Communications was sold by its parent company, Austar United Communications, to a new joint venture with Telstra that became known as TelstraSaturn. TelstraClear was then created by the merger of Telstra's TelstraSaturn and Clear Communications in December 2001.

In July 2012 Vodafone NZ approached Telstra to purchase TelstraClear for a payment of $840 million, and $450 million that TelstraClear had in its accounts. The Commerce Commission approved the bid on 30 October, and the sale was completed on 31 October. TelstraClear's final trading day was 31 March 2013.

=== WorldxChange (WxC) ===
On 10 June 2015, Vodafone NZ acquired WorldxChange, a New Zealand based telecommunications business. WorldxChange delivered communications services to government, corporate, and business customers; and fibre broadband to residential customers.

=== Defend Limited ===
In February 2022 Vodafone NZ signed a conditional agreement to acquire a 60% majority share in cybersecurity specialist company Defend.

=== Dense Air ===
One NZ committed to acquiring Dense Air, in order to use their 2x35MHz of 2600 MHz spectrum rights, and immediately deploy it for use on its 5G network. The acquisition of Dense Air by One NZ was approved by the Commerce Commission on 6 May 2024.

== Mobile services ==
=== Coverage ===
One NZ operates a 4G LTE network at 700 MHz, 900 MHz 1800 MHz, 2100 MHz and 2600 MHz and a 5G NR network using Bands n7, n8, and n78. It states that the network provides service in "Our mobile network covers over 99% of the population, with 4G/5G coverage to over 99% by late 2024". One NZ operated a GSM (2G) mobile phone network, a UMTS (3G) network up until 2025, and is now refarming those frequencies of 900 MHz and 2100 MHz across to 4G and 5G.

On 25 October 2024, One NZ confirmed that it would delay plans to close its 2G and 3G services until 31 December 2025.

On 19 January 2025, One NZ announced the first region to have 3G switched off would be Dunedin.

==== GSM Coverage (2G) ====
One NZ operated a nationwide GSM service in the 900 MHz band. In areas with high demand One used to operate additional GSM services in the 1800 MHz band, usually from existing 900 MHz cell sites, to provide more capacity. Areas that had both 900 MHz and 1800 MHz service included most major business districts and large shopping malls. Most phones sold since the mid-1990s supported both bands.

In March 2016 Vodafone New Zealand announced plans to shut down its 2G (GSM) network, beginning with voice and messaging services. Vodafone's Spokesperson Elissa Downey commented that they would keep the GSM network running until 2025, although it would only support devices using GSM data such as electricity meters that send readings over the network, and that they would be announcing the end date for its 2G voice service soon. In early August 2016, however, it was reported that Vodafone was reconsidering its choice to shut down the network, with Spokesperson Andrea Brady stating that the 2G network "will not be switched off anytime soon as it continues to serve customers across New Zealand". This announcement came following the company's criticism of rival operator Spark's billboard campaign that claimed "Vodafone's 2G network is shutting down" and invited customers to "switch before [they're] ditched", despite neither Spark, nor its child division Skinny Mobile – whom the campaign was run under – operating a compatible 2G network. The campaign was denounced by Vodafone as "pretty misleading", shortly followed by the announcement that 2G voice services would not be ended any time soon. On 4 April 2024, One NZ announced the planned shutdown date for its 2G network. The announcement was made alongside the revised shutdown date for its 3G network. Both the 2G and 3G networks are scheduled to be shut down on 31 December 2025.

==== UMTS Coverage (3G) ====
Currently being shut down, One NZ once operated UMTS (3G) service using the 2100 MHz band. UMTS service is often provided from the same cell site as 900 MHz and/or 1800 MHz GSM services. Most of the existing 900 MHz sites were built in the 1990s when it was not expected that a 2100 MHz network would be built, hence the existing 900 MHz network was not at all optimised for 2100 MHz service. Due to the fact that 900 MHz and 1800 MHz signals propagate further than 2100 MHz signals, there were many areas beyond 2100 MHz coverage where UMTS phones would have to hand down to 900 MHz or 1800 MHz GSM service. One NZ established many individual 2100 MHz UMTS sites to enhance 3G coverage.

In rural areas, One NZ had installed 900 MHz UMTS (3G) service alongside their existing 900 MHz GSM (2G) service. The 900 MHz UMTS service has roughly the same coverage area as 900 MHz GSM service, so instances of UMTS service being handed down to GSM should occur far less often in rural areas than in areas covered by the 2100 MHz network. However, older UMTS phones only support 2100 MHz service so these phones will hand down to 900 MHz GSM even though there is UMTS service available at 900 MHz.

Rural Broadband Initiative (RBI) coverage: One NZ have a contract with the New Zealand government to provide fixed cellular access to the internet with antennas mounted on the outside of buildings, homes and businesses at speeds of at least 5 Mbit/s. Much of the coverage as of 2015 is on 900 MHz 3G (hands down to 2G as a backup). By January 2016, One NZ had actively extended its 4G network throughout key rural areas, and was on track to deliver speeds as high as 100 Mbit/s.

RBI services is sold by many ISPs and can include voice services and internet services designed to give similar plans and pricing as landline. One NZ wholesales RBI services over cellular to many ISPs, and any ISP may provide RBI services over cellular, ADSL and UFB fibre, whatever is available at the customer's rural property (urban areas are excluded from RBI offerings).

In August 2022, One NZ announced plans to shut down its 3G network as early as August 2024. On 4 April 2024, the company stated that the shutdown would be delayed from 31 August 2024 to 31 March 2025. On 24 August 2024, One NZ announced a further postponement, rescheduling the 3G shutdown to 31 December 2025. The same date was also set for the planned shutdown of its 2G network.

==== LTE Coverage (4G) ====
One NZ offers 4G LTE coverage across New Zealand, claiming coverage to over 99% of the population by late 2024. One NZ uses frequencies at 700 MHz (Band 28), 900 MHz (Band 8), 1800 MHz (Band 3), 2100 MHz (Band 1), and 2600 MHz (Band 7) for 4G.

4G was originally considered an "add-on" and was included in three higher level plans and the Vodafone Red plans. The 700 MHz 4G LTE frequency used in New Zealand is APT band 28 and was first launched by Vodafone in Papakura on 21 July 2014.

==== 5G NR Coverage (5G) ====
One NZ launched its 5G service in Auckland, Wellington, Christchurch and Queenstown on 10 December 2019, and rolled out the service to other cities in recent years. One NZ planned to roll out 4G/5G to 99% of the population by late 2024 as the One NZ 3G network will no longer be available in these areas.

=== Mobile virtual network service ===
One NZ also provides services for mobile virtual network operators. This means other companies can resell One NZ's network services (data, telephone and SMS) under their own brand name. Their customers connect to One NZ's network as any other One NZ customer would, but instead of seeing "One NZ" as the network operator, they will see the name of the company they pay for these services.

MVNO networks do not have their own cellular equipment, so customers connect to One NZ's network constantly, instead of jumping between networks. Current MVNOs running on One NZ's network include: Kogan Mobile, Mighty Mobile (owned by online retailer Mighty Ape) and formerly Black + White Mobile.

This differed from a roaming arrangement previously in place with 2degrees, who offloaded customers onto the (former) Vodafone network when they were not in a 2degrees mobile coverage zone. 2degrees had this roaming agreement with Vodafone until 2020, and as such, their customers roamed only on the network when they had no coverage, otherwise they would connect to 2degrees' own equipment.

=== Phone numbers ===
In New Zealand, all mobile phone numbers start with 02. One NZ is allocated the 021 prefix with other networks being allocated other prefixes – such as 022 to 2degrees, and 027 to Spark. Number portability was introduced to the New Zealand market on 2 April 2007 which means that customers can bring, for example, their 021 prefixed number to Spark or 2degrees.

==== 029 Prefix ====
Vodafone NZ used to operate the 029 prefix on behalf of TelstraClear, in addition to its own 021 prefix. TelstraClear customers, mostly corporates, were able to get mobile numbers with this prefix; these customers were billed by TelstraClear, rather than being billed directly by Vodafone. This agreement lapsed in 2007, and in 2008 some of these customers were transitioned to Telecom who serviced them initially with CDMA2000 technology. Those TelstraClear 029 customers not transitioned to Telecom New Zealand remained with Vodafone. Subsequently, TelstraClear joined Telecom as a MVNO operator, but that relationship soured and TelstraClear re-signed with Vodafone in 2009, "ending the possibility of a move to Telecom's new XT network" and remaining on the Vodafone network.

==== Comparison with 027 prefix ====
Spark NZ (formerly Telecom New Zealand), One NZ's rival, has fixed 10-digit numbers under its 0272–0279 prefixes, which allows approximately 7 million possible numbers. Telecom originally had mixed 9-digit and 10-digit numbers using the older 025 prefix. The 027 prefix with only 10-digit numbers simplified its numbering system at the time of launching its CDMA network. The older 025 prefix was phased out with its now redundant AMPS and TDMA networks.

=== 3G services ===
On 10 August 2005 Vodafone introduced a 3G network employing the UMTS technology widely used in Europe and elsewhere. Using this standard, Vodafone now offers Video calling, music downloads, SKY mobile TV and other services from its Vodafone live! portal.

Vodafone began rolling out HSPA+ data services on its UMTS network in 2011; at the time of writing (May 2012), Auckland, Wellington and Christchurch have coverage. HSPA+ is capable of a theoretical maximum 168 Mbit/s download speed and 22 Mbit/s upload speed, although higher speeds are only supported in areas with an excellent radio signal.

Vodafone launched HD Voice on 7 November 2013 – a high definition voice call technology. This technology works over 3G with HD Voice compatible phones on Vodafone to Vodafone voice calls.

One NZ announced that its 3G network will be shut down on 31 December 2025, the same date scheduled for the closure of its 2G network.

=== iPhone ===
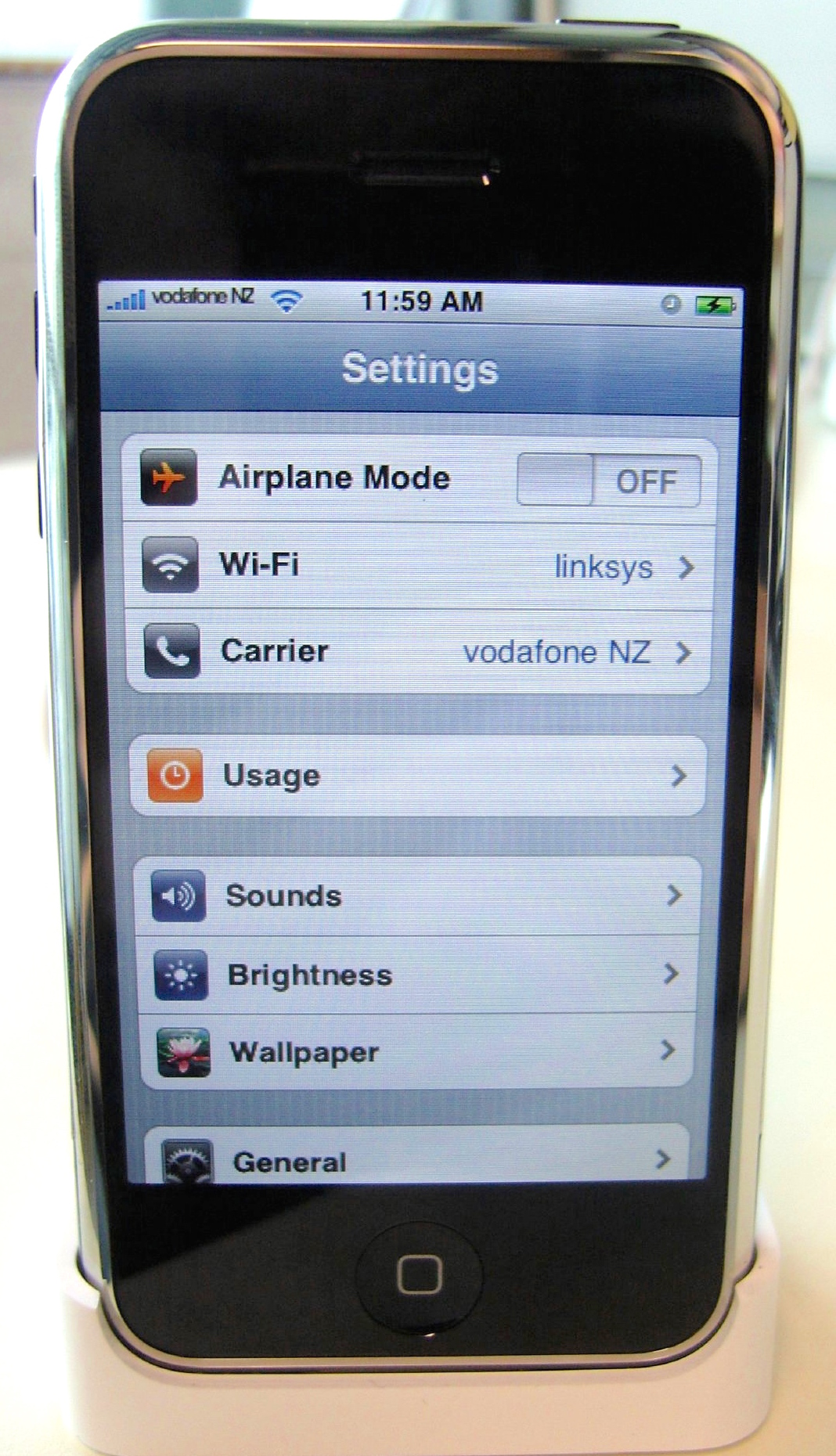
The first model of the iPhone (on the Vodafone network)

The first iPhone 3G released on 11 July 2008 was sold by Vodafone in Auckland, New Zealand to 22-year-old student Jonny Gladwell at 12:01 am NZST. The iPhone 3G was only available to customers on the Vodafone network. 3G coverage for iPhone 3G was limited to major urban centres, as the phone operated on 850, 1900 and 2100 MHz bands; Vodafone's 3G network used 900 and 2100 MHz. (The 850 MHz 3G band was used by Spark NZ.) 900 MHz capability was added from the iPhone 3GS and subsequent models of iPhone.

== Fixed-line broadband ==
=== ADSL and VDSL ===
One NZ no longer offers copper-based ADSL and VDSL services. Vodafone bought ihug in 2006, and inherited two ISPs, Paradise.net and Clearnet when it purchased TelstraClear in 2012.

=== DOCSIS (cable) ===
One NZ also offered DOCSIS cable modem broadband within the former TelstraClear's network.

In June 2016, Vodafone upgraded its cable network to DOCSIS 3.1, in order to support gigabit speeds.

One NZ's standard plan provides up to 912 Mbit/s download and 104 Mbit/s upload, but is no longer available to buy.

==== Coverage ====
One NZ's cable network was available in the following areas:

- Most of Wellington City, excluding Tawa, Churton Park, Glenside, Broadmeadows, Ngauranga, Kaiwharawhara, and central Wellington (bound by State Highway 1 and Kent Terrace)
- Lower Hutt, including Wainuiomata and Stokes Valley, but excluding Haywards, Manor Park, the western hill suburbs (west of State Highway 2) and eastern bay suburbs (Point Howard to Muritai, including Eastbourne)
- Upper Hutt, excluding Tōtara Park
- Kapiti urban area (Waikanae to Paekākāriki)
- Southern and eastern Christchurch, including the suburbs of Mairehau, Shirley, Richmond, Avonside, Dallington, Wainoni, Avondale, Aranui, Bexley, parts of New Brighton and North New Brighton, Bromley, Linwood, Ferrymead, Woolston, Opawa, Waltham, Sydenham, Saint Martins, Beckenham, Somerfield, Addington, Spreydon, Hoon Hay, Hillmorton, Middleton, parts of Riccarton and Upper Riccarton (south of and including Riccarton Road), Sockburn, Broomfield, Hei Hei, and parts of Islington and Hornby.

=== UFB ===
One NZ offers a range of Ultra-Fast Broadband (UFB fibre) products.

== Television ==
One NZ, then Vodafone operated an internet television (IPTV) service under the brand "VodafoneTV". It was delivered over a broadband connection. The TV service was originally operated over a cable network formerly owned by TelstraClear in Auckland, Wellington, and Christchurch.

Customers could receive Freeview channels via a Vodafone TV box and had the ability to subscribe to Sky TV channels. Selected content was available in high-definition.

TechTV was available up until May 2004, when current owner Comcast halted international broadcasts. Chilli, an adult channel was also available until 2006 when CEO Alan Freeth discontinued the product on moral grounds. Visitor TV was closed down after the 22 February earthquake.

In September 2010, TelstraClear released their own PVR called the T-Box. The launch followed the release by parent company Telstra (AU) of a similar product. As of June 2011, TelstraClear ceased all analogue transmission on its cable network.

VodafoneTV was relaunched in 2019 as a standalone product. A customer could purchase a VodafoneTV box from a retailer and access the service using any broadband provider. The new box had various OTT media streaming apps pre-installed.

Vodafone announced the closure of the VodafoneTV service on 9 December 2021, to be retired on 30 September 2022. This end date was then extended to 28 February 2023, before finally closing on 31 March 2023.

== Advertising ==
In May 2024, One NZ's advertising started with the slogan "Let's get connected".

== Criticism and complaints ==
Between 2006 and 2009, Vodafone ran a series of advertisements and promotions which were found to be misleading, and led to complaints – and eventually a series of large fines in 2011 and 2012 – after action was taken by the Commerce Commission under the Fair Trading Act. Vodafone NZ issued an apology for this incident.
