= TelstraClear =

New Zealand telecommunications company

- Type: Subsidiary of Vodafone New Zealand
- Industry: Telecommunications
- Predecessor: Saturn Communications; Clear Communications
- Founded: November 2001 (as TelstraClear)
- Fate: Acquisition
- Successor: Vodafone New Zealand
- Headquarters: Auckland, New Zealand
- Products: Voice; Internet; Digital TV; Mobile
- Number of employees: 1300

TelstraClear Limited was New Zealand's second-largest telecommunications company before being acquired by Vodafone New Zealand in October 2012, previous to which it was a subsidiary of Australian company Telstra.

It provided residential line rental services, internet services, IT services, security services, cable TV/cable modem and mobile telephone services to 70,000 subscribers on its network in Wellington, Christchurch and Kapiti. Overall the company had around 200,000 customers.

In 2004, TelstraClear began offering residential line HomePlan services including broadband outside those areas where it has its own network, reselling the ADSL wholesale product from Telecom New Zealand, and investing millions in local loop unbundling, which entailed TelstraClear installing its own equipment in Telecom exchanges (the Telecom infrastructure business later became Chorus Limited).

== History ==
TelstraClear had its beginnings in New Zealand with Kiwi Cable in the Kāpiti Coast district, Clear Communications in 1990, and Telstra New Zealand in 1996.

Telstra NZ slowly expanded its operations in the business market, bundling Telecom New Zealand services distributed as a reseller with its own network services. It installed switches in Auckland and Wellington to manage incoming and outgoing international traffic and maintained an interconnect agreement with Telecom New Zealand and is likely to have had others with companies such as Clear Communications.

In 1999 Saturn Communications was sold by its parent company, Austar United Communications, to a new joint venture with Telstra that became known as TelstraSaturn.

TelstraClear was then created by the merger of Telstra's TelstraSaturn and Clear Communications in December 2001. Austar United Communications held an initial investment of 42% in TelstraClear before selling it back to Telstra. In March 2002, TelstraClear unveiled a new advertising campaign highlighting what the company saw as the increased competition and benefits the merger would create for New Zealand.

TelstraClear had plans to expand its cable network into Auckland, but cancelled the plan in 2004 due to community opposition and questions about the business case.

In 2004 TelstraClear made its first acquisition in the IT market with the purchase of Sytec, mainly for its IP telephony and security skills, in particular the specialist managed security subsidiary DMZGlobal. In 2007 Sytec was formally introduced into the TelstraClear's enterprise and government division and the brand retired, but the DMZGlobal brand was retained and invested in.

=== Acquisition by Vodafone ===
In July 2012, Vodafone New Zealand announced plans to acquire TelstraClear. Vodafone approached Telstra to purchase TelstraClear for a payment of $840 million, and $450 million that TelstraClear had in its accounts. The Commerce Commission approved the bid on 30 October, and the sale was completed on 31 October. TelstraClear's final trading day was 31 March 2013. By May 2013, Vodafone said it had made good progress merging the two businesses, and that the TelstraClear branding would completely disappear by the end of that month.

== Services ==
=== Telephone ===
Services are available from the "on-net" areas, where TelstraClear has its own network technology based on copper wires or fibre. These areas include parts of Central Auckland, Hamilton, Rotorua, Napier, Palmerston North, Wanganui, Kapiti, Wellington, and Christchurch, with actual technology varying based on reach and type.

==== Plain Old Telephone Services (POTS) ====
'InHome' residential telephone service with vertical service code products were available in one of the following ways depending on location:

- Saturn Communications' established cable network, in Kapiti, Wellington and Christchurch.
- TelstraClear maintained equipment in Chorus unbundled exchanges in inner city suburbs.
- Chorus maintained equipment in all other Chorus exchanges covering most outer lying suburbs and towns.

Single fixed line business telephone services were offered in 'on-net' ADSL and 'off-net' POTS Chorus fixed line areas.

==== Trunk lines ====
Business telephone services are available in 'on-net' ISDN inner city suburbs with basic and primary rate lines. In other areas, services are available using Chorus owned ISDN/ADSL lines and exchanges (primary lite, basic and (in special cases) legacy primary rates).

With 'IP Connect' SIP trunking became available in inner city suburbs.

==== Data networking ====
'Private IP', was a non-VPN leased line WAN service for business and wholesale customers is essentially an 'Ethernet Anywhere' service delivered over a combination of the TelstraClear fixed line network, networks leased from Chorus HSNS, Araneo Wireless and Network Tasman Fibre. The service provided interconnection into Australia via either Telstra GWAN or TelstraClear operated TransTasman lines.

==== Mobile ====
TelstraClear provided mobile data service through Vodafone, on their 3G GSM network since early 2010.

- In July 2006, TelstraClear announced they would build their own UMTS network in Tauranga, expanding to other locations. They would roam to other networks when outside these areas. This did not eventuate, and created acrimony with Vodafone NZ.
- Until 2007, TelstraClear sold a mobile service on Vodafone's GSM & UMTS network. Billing was from Telstra, but the customers ultimately belonged to Vodafone.
- In 2007, TelstraClear signed a wholesale mobile deal to access the Telecom New Zealand CDMA network, and began offering new services to small and medium size enterprises. In 2008, they started to offer non-business service using Telecom's network. In 2009 they were negotiating to use Telecom's new XT (UMTS) network but Telecom would not allow access until 2011.
- Customers using CDMA handsets on the Telecom network will continue to operate until at least 2012. Mobile Number Portability will allow existing customers (or customers from other carriers) to move to TelstraClear (on Vodafone) with the appropriate handset, and keep their existing mobile number.
- TelstraClear sold services on the Telecom NZ network until late 2009 with mobile data service via the Telecom NZ network. It used CDMA2000 technology.
- In July 2009, TelstraClear announced they would begin using Vodafone's network again, and this agreement came into place in 2010.

=== Internet ===
==== Fixed line technologies ====
ADSL TelstraClear owned two ISPs, Paradise.net and Clearnet, with Clearnet becoming the umbrella brand. Both offered nationwide dialup and DSL service, resold over Telecom's DSL lines and also over unbundled exchanges. A number of their dial-up IP numbers were blacklisted as abusers by sites such as DSBL.

VDSL2 Only available to business customers in the 'on-net' areas, this technology was used to deliver the product BizBroadband and BizNet, as well as the IP Voice products (IP FeatureLine, IP Connect, IP Gateway, IP Clarity).

DOCSIS (cable) TelstraClear also offered DOCSIS cable modem internet access within TelstraClear's own (built) network. TelstraClear offered standard speeds of up to 15 Mbit/s, and TelstraClear have also released 100 Mbit/s plans with 10 Mbit/s upload.

Since late 2009, new connections were only available on Clearnet.

=== IT and security ===
With the acquisition of Sytec and the formation of Enterprise and Government division, TelstraClear provided managed network solutions, ICT services (such as desktop and device management and co-location), enterprise comms and contact center solutions. In addition under the DMZGlobal brand TelstraClear provided Internet security, managed security, and security consulting services.

=== Television ===
TelstraClear operated the Hybrid Fibre Cable pay television network under the brand "InHomeTV". It was developed by Saturn Communications in Wellington, Kāpiti and Christchurch, prior to the sale to Telstra, and formerly known as Saturn TV. The network infrastructure includes twisted pair cabling used for residential and business local telephone service.

Programming is sourced from SKY Network Television following an agreement in 2002 and also locally received and sourced channels. The agreement allowed TelstraClear to distribute and bill for services provided by SKY Network Television on its own InHome digital TV network.

In September 2010, TelstraClear released their own PVR called the T-BOX. The launch followed the release by parent company Telstra (AU) of a similar product.

As of June 2011 TelstraClear ceased all analogue transmission on its cable network.

In May 2012 TelstraClear started sourcing its own Pay Per View movies and changes its branding to InHome Movies.

InHomeTV was available on TelstraClear's HFC Cable network in Wellington, Christchurch and Kapiti. The service was only available if bundled with TelstraClear's telephony service or internet products.

==== Interactive Services ====
- Electronic Programme Guide (EPG) – television listing information.
- Pay Per View (PPV) Guide – Inhome Movies listing information.

==== Defunct Channels ====
- TechTV was available up until May 2004, when current owner Comcast halted international broadcasts.
- Chilli (an adult channel) was also available until 2006 when CEO Alan Freeth discontinued the product on moral grounds.
- Wild TV
- Visitor TV (This has been closed down after the Christchurch 22 February earthquake.)
- TBN has also ceased due to their financial limitations

=== Others ===
==== Phonecards ====
TelstraClear issued remote memory phonecards. The cards started in March 2002 after Net Tel was taken over TelstraClear. The TalkPlus card, issued by Clear Communications since 1998 had similar cards issued under the TelstraClear branding. The cards include Talk Talk, E-Phone, Pacific Talk, TalkPlus Global and Cheap Chat. In 2003, the Holiday Parks Association phonecard introduced as a E-Phone card. Later the card changed to a TalkPlus Global card. In 2010, TelstraClear introduced the Prepaid Max card, which is only available online. In 2014 Vodafone issued the SuperGold phonecard.
