= WEL Networks =

New Zealand electricity distribution company

- Industry: Electricity distribution
- Headquarters: Hamilton, New Zealand
- Key people: Garth Dibley, CEO (since Sep 2014)
- Owner: WEL Energy Trust
- Website: www.wel.co.nz

WEL Networks Limited is an electricity distribution company, serving the northern and central Waikato region of New Zealand. WEL is the sixth largest electricity distribution company in New Zealand, with 100,142 connections and 7,021 km (4,363 mi) of lines and underground cables. The company is 100% owned by the WEL Energy Trust.

== History ==
WEL was formed when legislation in 1988 amalgamated the Central Waikato Electric Power Board with Hamilton City Council's Electricity Division from 1989 to form Waikato Electricity Limited. After amalgamation, ownership of WEL was vested in the Waikato Electricity Authority (WEA). WEA formed WEL Energy Trust in 1993, with the first election in June, so that the community could have some ownership of WEL. In 1992 a third of WEL was sold to Utilicorp for almost $40m, a third retained for the Trust and a third given to customers. The Electricity Industry Reform Act 1998 forced WEL to sell its retail business. It sold to the State owned (but later bought as NGC by Vector Limited) Natural Gas Corporation for $89.9m. The Trust then bought back all WEL's shares to become its sole owner. In 2001 WEL was renamed WEL Networks Ltd.

After the Trust's 2003 elections it reduced grants given to community groups and started paying discounts to customers. By 2014 the Trust had paid over $240 million to customers in discounts, but had also invested over $60 million in community and energy efficiency grants. In 2014–15, over $2m was paid in grants.

WEL Networks formed a joint venture in 2010 with Waipā Networks and Crown Fibre Holdings to establish Ultra-fast Fibre Limited, a company that owns and operates the fibre network in Hamilton, New Plymouth, Tauranga, and Whanganui. In 2016, WEL and Waipā Networks paid $189 million to take 100% control of the Ultra-Fast Fibre company. In 2020, WEL and Waipā Networks sold their interest in Ultra-fast Fibre to Japanese-owned First State Investments for $854 million.

In 2022, the company announced the construction of New Zealand's first utility-scale battery energy storage system (BESS), to be located at Huntly. The system is rated at 35 MW, and is capable of storing energy equivalent to the daily demand of over 2000 homes.

== Distribution network ==
WEL's distribution area covers the Hamilton City and the majority of the Waikato District, including the towns of Ngāruawāhia, Huntly, Te Kauwhata and Raglan. The distribution network is supplied from the national grid at three grid exit points (GXPs): Hamilton (Ruakura Road), Te Kowhai, and Huntly. WEL Networks uses 33,000 volts for subtransmission and 11,000 volts for distribution. As is standard in New Zealand, electricity is delivered to homes at 230/400 volts (phase-to-neutral/phase-to-phase).

== Statistics ==
WEL Networks Limited network statistics for the year ending 31 March 2024
Parameter	Value
Regulatory asset base	$751 million
Line charge revenue	$111.5 million
Capital expenditure	$96.6 million
Operating expenditure	$37.1 million
Customer connections	100,250
Energy delivered	1,434 GWh
Peak demand	313 MW
Total line length	5,670 km
Distribution and low-voltage overhead lines	2,886 km
Distribution and low-voltage underground cables	2,338 km
Subtransmission lines and cables	446 km
Poles	39,755
Distribution transformers	6,263
Zone substation transformers	49
Average interruption duration (SAIDI)	179 minutes
Average interruption frequency (SAIFI)	1.81

== Regulation ==
As a natural monopoly electricity lines business, WEL Networks is subject to regulation under the Commerce Act 1986. However, as WEL Networks is 100% owned by a consumer trust, it is not subject to price-quality regulation, but is subject to Information Disclosure regulation. The Commerce Commission publishes a wide range of Information Disclosure data provided by WEL Networks, and prepares analysis and summaries of that data.

== Generation assets ==
WEL networks owns the 68MW Te Uku Wind Farm in a joint venture with Meridian Energy. From 2004 to 2012 it operated a 900kW landfill gas powerplant at the Horotiu landfill.

In 2022 the company established a subsidiary, NewPower Energy, to own and operate renewable generation. Newpower currently owns the 35 MWh Rotohiko Battery energy storage system the 4.8 MW Naumai solar farm, and the 33 MW Taiohi solar farm. Another solar farm, Rangimārie (12 MW), was completed in 2026. In December 2025 it announced the acquisition of a fully consented 30MWp solar project from Lightyears solar, with construction due to start in 2026.

=== Operational ===
Name	Type	Location	Capacity (MW)	Annual generation (average GWh)	Commissioned
Rotohiko	BESS	Huntly, Waikato	35		2024
Naumai	Solar	Dargaville, Northland	4.8		2024
Rangimārie	Solar	Maramarua, Waikato	12		2026
Taiohi	Solar	Rangiriri, Waikato	33		2025

=== Proposed / under construction ===
Name	Type	Location	Projected capacity (MW)	Status
Cambridge	Solar	Cambridge, Waikato	30	Consented

== Incidents ==
On a particularly cold winter night in August 2021, the National Grid operator Transpower, gave an emergency instruction to WEL Networks to reduce its demand from the grid by 20%. This resulted in power cuts for around 18,000 WEL Networks customers. The demand restrictions required of WEL Networks were significantly greater than for other networks. Transpower subsequently admitted an error in their calculation of the required demand reduction. WEL Networks estimated that they would only have been required to disconnect 1,373 customers (instead of almost 18,000), if the error had not been made. Transpower was eventually fined $150,000 for their part in contributing to the loss of supply to customers.

== Subsidiaries ==
- NewPower Energy
