= Ultra-Fast Broadband (New Zealand) =

New Zealand government programme

The Ultra-Fast Broadband initiative is a New Zealand Government programme of building fibre-to-the-home networks covering 87% of the population by the end of 2022. It is a public–private partnership of the government with four companies with total government investment of NZ$1.5 billion. The project planned to provide speeds of at least 100 Mbit/s downstream and 50 Mbit/s upstream, though upgradable to 10 times that speed.

Initially, the plan was to have fibre within reach of 75% of the population by 2019 with an investment of $1.35 billion. In August 2017, the government announced the target was to be expanded to 87% of the population and to be completed by 2022.

== Proposal in 2008 ==
In the 2008 election National promised to rollout a fibre broadband network to 75% of New Zealand homes and businesses in ten years for $1.5 billion. This had been advocated by MP Maurice Williamson who in 2006 had produced a long paper advocating “fibre to the home” which was then only working in South Korea; he also studied trials by Verizon in San Diego. John Key threw his paper back to him, saying “you can have your fucking fibre”. .

The proposal was that the new network would be ‘open access” with a public-private partnership and avoiding excessive duplication. Some players said that fibre would become redundant rather than wireless broadband, but fibre is almost limitless and depends on the end equipment, while wireless suffers from contention as with more users it gets slower. Telecom wanted to gradually replace the existing copper network, but internationally most telecoms were slow to change from copper. Telecom also wanted to remain as a vertically integrated provider, but finally announced agreement to structural separation into Chorus (wholesale only) and Spark in 2011, after losing out to other companies in several areas. Steven Joyce had supported the proposal as “doable”, and was given the job as Minister of Transport in the Fifth National Government of implementing it, until about 2014 when Amy Adams and then Simon Bridges took over. He started by de-funding the Digitable Development Council an expensive talk shop. After a visit to Stephen Conroy the minister in charge of the Australian fibre rollout project with Telstra, Joyce and the accompanying officials decided that it was alesson in what not to do; relying on Telstra who could afford to delay action, and resulting in expenditure of tens of billions of dollars buying infrastructure (ducts etc.) off Telstra (renationalising it!). So far (c2023) Australia has spent $US52 billion, and much of urban Australia still does not have access to fibre.

== Partner companies ==
Crown Fibre Holdings Limited (CFH) was a Crown-owned company set up to manage the project. CFH has contracted four companies to deploy fibre network. The money for bidders was to be a (free) loan not a grant, with partner companies putting-up at least half the costs. Money was all to go into the last mile from the node to the home, not into back-haul or international links.

In 2010, a year after the National government was elected, indicative bids were sought and 36 bids were received. The bidding was set up for regions, as some power line companies were interested. Negotiations took nearly a year. In December 2010 deals were made with two parties; Northpower for Whangarei and WEL Networks for Hamilton, Tauranga, New Plymouth, Whanganui, Te Awamutu Cambridge and Hawera. Rollout to be completed by 2015. Telecom missed out on 16% of the rollout and in 2011 with plans to negotiate with Vector in Auckland and another consortium for the rest of the North Island Telecom got serious. On 24 May 2011 Crown Fibre announced agreement with Enable in Christchurch and with Telecom in Auckland and areas elsewhere in the country not yet contracted. As a deal requirement Telecom agreed to structural separation. In October 2011 Telecom split into Chorus (infrastructure arm, to lay fibre, wholesale only) and Spark (retail and cellphone arm).despite previous opposition from the Telecom CE Paul Reynolds.

The main partner is Chorus, which won 69% of the roll out area. Chorus was part of the incumbent telco Telecom New Zealand; but Chorus Limited (the infrastructure arm) and Spark (the retail and cellphone arm) were split off into separate companies in order to participate in this project (Crown Fibre had successfully stared them down).

CFH was to invest NZ$929 million in the form of interest free loans provided to Chorus.

There are also three Local Fibre Companies (LFC) owned by local electricity lines companies or local government. They are:

- Ultra Fast Fibre (13.7%), a partnership with lines company WEL Networks covering the central North Island including Hamilton, Cambridge, Te Awamutu, Tauranga, Tokoroa, New Plymouth, Hāwera and Whanganui.
- Northpower Fibre (1.6%), a partnership with lines company Northpower covering Whangārei.
- Enable Networks (15.3%), a partnership with the Christchurch City Council through its trading arm CCHL covering the Christchurch, Rangiora, and Rolleston areas.

The government aims to collect all the investment back in 2036. Due to the loan being interest free, the government expect this to cost $600m in opportunity cost.

Initially, the Ultra-Fast Broadband network was not to be subject to the regulations placed on other telecommunications companies by the Commerce Commission until 2020. After protests by telecommunications companies, consumer groups and opposition parties, the government allowed Crown Fibre Holdings to be regulated by the Commerce Commission. However, the government agreed to compensate the partner companies by giving more favourable terms for the use of government loans for the project.

== Technology ==
The technology used is gigabit-capable passive optical network (GPON) for residential customers, and point to point for large businesses. Dark fibre is also available.

Chorus or the LFCs wholesale services to ISPs, who in turn offer services to their customers. There are 89 retail providers offering UFB services.

The original contract between CFH and the fibre network companies specifies that there are to be wholesale residential plans of 30 Mbit/s download with 10 Mbit/s upload and 100 Mbit/s download with 50 Mbit/s upload.

The fibre network companies also offer other residential and business plans. A gigabit residential service of up to 1 Gbit/s download and 500 Mbit/s upload and Business gigabit services (with higher CIR (committed information rates) are available in all UFB areas.

As of June 2018, unlimited residential UFB plans start from NZ$69.00 for 30 Mbit/s download / 10 Mbit/s upload (50/10 at same cost in Chorus areas) NZ$72.00 for 100 Mbit/s download / 20 Mbit/s upload (200/20 at same cost in Enable areas starting 1 July 2018 ) and NZ$99.99 for 1000 Mbit/s download / 500 Mbit/s upload.

Chorus reports that 76% of mass market fibre plans now sold are 100 Mbit/s or faster and the average monthly data use by a fibre customer is 250 GB.

Customers must arrange the final connection to the UFB network with their ISP, who in turn arranges connection with the relevant fibre network company. The fibre network company then installs the fibre lead-in from the street to the customer's premises, the external termination point (ETP) and the optical network terminal (ONT). If the fibre lead-in needs to travel along shared rights of way or through cross-lease land, all affected neighbours must consent to the installation. The standard ONT provides four gigabit Ethernet ports and two ATA phone ports. It is also possible to have ONTs that provide WiFi, or radio over fiber.

For each area an ISP wishes to serve, it needs to put in a handover point and organize a backhaul link back to its core network. (There are 33 points of interconnect (POIs), one for each UFB candidate area.) Therefore, only a few ISPs offer nationwide UFB services, and the majority only focus in a few areas. This is different to DSL, where Chorus can deliver all of an ISP's customers nationwide to a single handover point, so ISPs can easily offer nationwide DSL service.

== Progress ==
The initial UFB project consisted of 33 areas covering 75% of the population and was completed at the end of 2019. The program was a boon to regional NZ and to people's lifestyles and as it turned out very handy in a pandemic. There were no uptake incentives; expecting that people would sign up for faster broadband.

UFB2 (January 2017) provided fibre to more than 151 new towns bringing coverage up to 85% of the population by the end of 2022. In 2017 $300 million was paid back by bid partners which was used to extend it to another 151 small NZ towns. Tiny villages like Midhurst in Taranaki, Naseby in Central Otago, Fox Glacier on the West Coast and Taipa in the far North got fibre.

UFB2+ (August 2017) will provide fibre to more than 190 new towns bringing coverage up to 87% of the population with the UFB2/2+ project to be fully rolled out by end of 2024.

By the end of 2014 takeup was 22%, well ahead of expected; by mid 2017 33% and by 2022 nearly 70%, putting NZ in the top ten fibre-connected countries. As of November 2019, the original UFB project was 100% complete, with an uptake of 55%

The complete list of all UFB locations is available on the Crown Infrastructure Partners website.

| UFB 1 area | Provider | Premises able to connect | Premises connected | Completed/Planned |
|---|---|---|---|---|
| Whangārei | Northpower | 23,012 | 50.3% | 8 May 2014 |
| Auckland | Chorus | 442,081 | 47.5% | 2019 |
| Waiheke Island | Chorus | 5,691 | 39.6% | 2017 |
| Pukekohe | Chorus | 8,271 | 45.1% | 2018 |
| Waiuku | Chorus | 3,645 | 54.1% | 19 May 2016 |
| Hamilton | UFF | 67,016 | 52.3% | 7 April 2016 |
| Cambridge | UFF | 8,670 | 49.9% | 13 February 2015 |
| Te Awamutu | UFF | 5,917 | 46.5% | 3 October 2014 |
| Tauranga | UFF | 60,975 | 53.2% | 11 March 2016 |
| Rotorua | Chorus | 26,710 | 47.6% | 17 June 2016 |
| Tokoroa | UFF | 5,473 | 42.3% | 13 February 2015 |
| Taupō | Chorus | 13,503 | 39.7% | 15 May 2015 |
| Whakatāne | Chorus | 7,141 | 40.7% | 23 September 2016 |
| Gisborne | Chorus | 14,797 | 28.8% | 2018 |
| Napier-Hastings | Chorus | 41,960 | 38.9% | 2019 |
| New Plymouth | UFF | 26,774 | 49.7% | 19 February 2016 |
| Hāwera | UFF | 4,943 | 46.7% | 13 February 2015 |
| Whanganui | UFF | 20,851 | 37.6% | 18 April 2015 |
| Palmerston North | Chorus | 32,240 | 42.2% | 2019 |
| Feilding | Chorus | 6,617 | 38.3% | 2018 |
| Levin | Chorus | 8,507 | 40.1% | 2017 |
| Masterton | Chorus | 9,608 | 44.5% | 3 December 2015 |
| Kāpiti | Chorus | 14,893 | 22.8% | 2019 |
| Wellington | Chorus | 147,144 | 34.4% | 2019 |
| Nelson | Chorus | 26,413 | 52.3% | 2017 |
| Blenheim | Chorus | 13,145 | 50.0% | 20 March 2015 |
| Greymouth | Chorus | 4,337 | 43.3% | 26 November 2015 |
| Christchurch metro (Note: Includes Rangiora, Woodend, Kaiapoi, Lyttelton, Rolleston and Lincoln) | Enable | 197,700 | 39.0% | 30 May 2018 |
| Ashburton | Chorus | 9,216 | 44.1% | 13 March 2015 |
| Timaru | Chorus | 14,613 | 48.3% | 30 April 2015 |
| Oamaru | Chorus | 6,747 | 41.7% | 15 December 2014 |
| Dunedin | Chorus | 53,291 | 51.3% | 22 June 2018 |
| Queenstown | Chorus | 7,989 | 45.2% | 29 July 2016 |
| Invercargill | Chorus | 24,916 | 41.5% | 2018 |

== Future ==
In 2015, the Government released a discussion document which sought views on how prices for UFB services should be set after 2019. The discussion paper ultimately resulted in the Telecommunications (New Regulatory Framework) Amendment Bill, which was passed in late 2018.
