= DMZGlobal =

- Type: Division of TelstraClear and Telstra
- Industry: Information security / Managed Security Services / Security Consultancy
- Founded: 2000 in New Zealand
- Headquarters: Wellington, New Zealand
- Key people: Adrian van Hest; Group Manager
- Products: Anti-virus, Anti-spam, Web filtering, Firewalls, Denial-of-service attack protection, Remote Access
- Parent: Vodafone NZ
- Website: dmzglobal.com

DMZGlobal is now the specialist security division of Vodafone New Zealand, after it was purchased from Telstra as part of sale of its New Zealand subsidiary TelstraClear. DMZGlobal is one of the leading Managed Security Service Providers (MSSP) in the Asia Pacific region and in 2009 and 2010 it was nominated for the organisational excellence in Information Security as part of the AusCERT Secure Computing Awards.

DMZGlobal made international headlines when they used Owen Walker for a number of seminars aimed at raising awareness of IT Security.

DMZGlobal also got media attention when a senior security engineer working for them ran the Race-to-zero malware competition at DEF CON (convention).

DMZGlobal provides managed security services, such as the only Distributed Denial-of-service attack protection service available in New Zealand and the only In Cloud Government approved mail encryption service. They also provide firewall management, clean Internet and e-mail services, and website hosting and protection.

DMZGlobal Ltd was founded in Wellington on 30 August 2000 as a wholly owned subsidiary of Sytec Resources Ltd. DMZGlobal was acquired by TelstraClear when it purchased Sytec Resources Ltd late 2004. Although DMZGlobal has grown significantly since the acquisition it ceased being a limited company in its own right in New Zealand and Australia when on 31 December 2006 it was absorbed back in Sytec Resources Ltd. Subsequently, on 30 June 2007 Sytec was also de-registered and absorbed into TelstraClear. The DMZGlobal (Australia) Pty Ltd company was de-registered on 10 December 2008. TelstraClear's Large Enterprise division merged with Sytec to form TelstraClear Enterprise and Government and align the organisational structure with Australian parent Telstra. As a division of TelstraClear it was part of Vodafone purchase that was approved by the Commerce Commission and the Overseas Investment Office on 30 October 2012

DMZGlobal used to be famous for its Ford BA Falcons and sponsorship of a boat in the New Zealand Offshore powerboat racing series, in particular the 2002 championship winning team piloted by the company's original founder Grant Smith.
