= Fair Trading Act 1986 =

Act of Parliament in New Zealand

New Zealand Parliament
- Long title: An Act to prohibit certain conduct and practices in trade, to provide for the disclosure of consumer information relating to the supply of goods and services for nz and to promote product safety and also to repeal the Consumer Information Act 1969 and certain other enactments.
- Royal assent: 17 December 1986
- Status: Current legislation

The Fair Trading Act 1986 is a statute of New Zealand, developed as complementary legislation to the Commerce Act 1986. Its purpose is to encourage competition and to protect consumers/customers from misleading and deceptive conduct and unfair trade practices.

The Fair Trading Act provides for consumer information standards. Under the Act, the Commerce Commission enforces product safety standards on items such as bicycles and flammability of children's night clothing.

== Main rules ==
The Act protects customers from unfair conduct. Unfair conduct has been classified in the act as the following:

1. Misleading and deceptive conduct: Generally, in relation to goods, in relation to services and in relation to employment
2. Unsubstantial representation
3. False representations
4. Unfair practices: These include but are not limited to Bait advertising, referral selling and trading stamp schemes. Regulation relation to Trading stamp schemes however has been repealed.

Part 2 of the Act also looks at Consumer information. It defines standards and also compliance requirements.

A 2015 amendment increased protection against "unfair contracts".

- Difference between the Fair Trading Act and the Consumer Guarantees Act (CGA): the FTA covers claims on products and services before they are bought while the CGA covers claims after the product or service has been bought.

== Amendments ==
On 11 September 2024, Parliament passed a private member's bill which amended the Fair Trading Act 1986 to ensure that gift cards have a minimum expiry date of three years from their initial purchase. The bill was supported by all parties except ACT.

== Cases ==
- BONZ Group (Pty) Ltd v Cooke (1994)
- Harvey Corporation Ltd v Barker (2002)
- Hay v Chalmers (1991)
- Mills v United Building Soc (1988)

== See also ==
- Consumer Guarantees Act 1993
- Fair Go, a New Zealand consumer protection television programme
