= Hay v Chalmers =

Legal case

- Court: District Court of New Zealand
- Full case name: Hay v Chalmers
- Decided: 1991
- Citation: 3 NZBLC 102,000

Keywords
- defamation, Fair Trading Act, misleading statement

Hay v Chalmers [1991] 3 NZBLC 102,000 was a New Zealand case in which the defendant, who was in debt, had made defamatory comments to his suppliers and creditors about the plaintiff, accusing him of misappropriating funds as his accountant. The plaintiff brought five causes of action under defamation and sought compensation under section 9 of the Fair Trading Act 1986. Damages were awarded to the plaintiff only for the loss of business, not for harm to reputation or goodwill.

== Background ==
Hay was the former accountant of Chalmers, and Chalmers, a self-employed mechanic made defamatory remarks to numerous suppliers and creditors of that he had not only misappropriated money from him, but that he was also currently under investigation for this misconduct. All of which was later proven to be false. As a result of these statements, the plaintiff lost clients and suffered a financial loss.

Rather than Hay sue Chalmers for defamation, he instead chose to file an action for damages under the Fair Trading Act where there are few defences, where all the plaintiff had to prove that these statements were misleading, and that they were made in the course of trade.

== Held ==
The court held that the statements were both misleading, as well as being made in the course of trade, and was awarded $80,000 in damages under the Fair Trading Act.
