= Quik Internet (NZ) Ltd =

Quik Internet (NZ) Limited was a New Zealand based Internet service provider, which began trading in 1998. It offered dialup, broadband and toll services nationwide. On 4 September 2006 it merged with the larger New Zealand ISP Ihug.

Quik Internet currently employs around 23 people. Its general manager is Scott Bartlett.

== See also ==
- List of countries by number of Internet users
