= BONZ Group (Pty) Ltd v Cooke =

Legal case in Newzealand

- Court: Court of Appeal of New Zealand
- Full case name: BONZ Group (Pty) Ltd v Diane Leone Cooke
- Citation: [1994] 3 NZLR 216
- Transcript: High Court judgment

BONZ Group (Pty) Ltd v Cooke [1994] 3 NZLR 216 is a cited case in New Zealand regarding section 9 of the Fair Trading Act 1986. The case is often cited regarding the definition of fabric designs as protected artworks under New Zealand copyright law.
