= Ihug =

Defunct New Zealand internet service provider

ihug Limited
- Type: Subsidiary
- Founded: 1994 in Auckland, New Zealand
- Headquarters: Auckland, New Zealand
- Owner: Vodafone NZ
- Number of employees: 100
- Website: www.ihug.co.nz

ihug was New Zealand's third largest ISP (behind Xtra and TelstraClear), before it was bought, then absorbed by Vodafone New Zealand (the country's largest mobile phone operator, later renamed One NZ). According to 2005 estimates, it had over 100,000 internet and phone subscribers. Before 2000 ihug was New Zealand's largest ISP but as other ISPs began offering flat rate services, some customers opted to transfer to those providers.

ihug originally stood for Internet Home Users Group, even though the name was seldom used. It was also known as The Internet Group or 'TIG' in Australia. ihug was sold to iiNet in 2003 before being sold to Vodafone in 2006 after interest from then Television New Zealand subsidiary THL and competitor Orcon. Its headquarters were in Auckland, New Zealand. The former CEO was Mark Rushworth, who became Manager of Marketing at Vodafone NZ.

The company also ran a small subscription television service in Auckland for a short period.

After Vodafone retired the ihug brand in April 2008, existing customers were moved to Vodafone's own internet services, although customers had the choice of retaining their email addresses until Vodafone later stopped providing email services.

== History ==
- 1994: ihug was started by brothers Nick and Tim Wood with $8000 from their father, John.
- 1995: ihug was the first New Zealand ISP to introduce a flat rate account.
- 1997: ihug begins trading in Australia.
  - ihug merges with Dunedin-based and South Island-focused ISP ES Net (Efficient Software), creating a combined subscriber base of 10,000.
  - ihug establishes SatNet and Ultra satellite broadband services.
- 1998: Over 4500 websites on the ihug homepages' server were deleted after the machine was hacked.
- 1999: Then owners Nick, Tim and John Wood were listed on the annual National Business Review Rich List, with an estimated combined wealth of $75 million.
  - Ihug launches ihugPhone, VoIP-based toll bypass and post-paid calling card voice services
- 2002: ihug appoints Martin Wylie as CEO to find a buyer of the company.
- 2003: ihug bought by iiNet for NZ$82 million.
- 2004: ihug purchases Wave Internet and PC Connect, gaining 10,000 Waikato and Bay of Plenty customers.
- 2005: ihug offloads satellite infrastructure to concentrate on ADSL broadband.
- On 4 September 2006, Quik merged with ihug.
- 2006: ihug sold to Vodafone (NZ operations only).
- 2008: Vodafone shuts down the ihug brand.

== See also ==
- Internet in New Zealand
