= Harvey Corporation Ltd v Barker =

- Court: Court of Appeal of New Zealand
- Full case name: Harvey Corporation Ltd v Barker
- Decided: 7 March 2002
- Citation: [2002] 2 NZLR 213

Court membership
- Judges sitting: Gault, Blanchard and McGrath JJ

Harvey Corporation Ltd v Barker [2002] 2 NZLR 213 is a cited case regarding relief for misrepresentation under the Fair Trading Act 1986.

== Background ==
Harvey Corporation, a real estate agency, sold via auction a house on behalf of their vendors, Mr and Mrs Daniel. The purchasers, the Bakers, subsequently discovered that the large ornamental gates at the front of the property, were situated on a "paper road" of the local council, something that the Daniels were aware of when they sold the property, but had neglected to inform their agent, Harvey's.

The Bakers subsequently sued both the Daniels, and Harveys in the District Court, and were awarded $55,000 in damages.

Harveys then appealed unsuccessfully to the High Court.

== Decision ==
The Court of Appeal overturned the earlier award for damages.
