= Clear Communications =

New Zealand telecommunications company

Clear Communications Ltd
- Type: Public
- Founded: 1988 (as the Alternative Telecommunications Company)
- Defunct: 2001
- Fate: Merged with TelstraSaturn
- Successor: TelstraClear
- Headquarters: Auckland, New Zealand
- Key people: George Newton (1990 - 1993), CEO; Andrew Makin (1993 - 1997); Tim Cullinane (1997 - 2000); Peter Kaliaropoulos (2000 - 2001)
- Website: clear.co.nz at the Wayback Machine (archived 2000-03-04)

Clear Communications Limited was a telecommunications company based in New Zealand. Until merging into Telstra's operations in 2001, it was the biggest rival to Telecom New Zealand.

== Background ==
Prior to 1987, New Zealand's telecommunications sector was dominated by the New Zealand Post Office, who also provided telephony and telegraph services. In 1987 the Post Office was split into three new businesses - Telecom Corporation of New Zealand, New Zealand Post and PostBank. When Telecom was created in 1987 the firm of Touche Ross was briefed to examine the feasibility of competition in New Zealand's telecommunications industry. Intensive research showed New Zealanders were unimpressed by the prices they were being charged and were not happy with a generally unresponsive service.

By June 1988 Richard Prebble, then Minister of State Owned Enterprises, announced to the country the intention to deregulate the telecommunications industry and open it to competition. The mandate to the new state-owned enterprise, Telecom, was to operate in a profitable manner in a fair and competitive environment. The free and open competition became law with the Telecommunications Amendment Act in December 1988. Full deregulation for the telecommunications industry came into effect on 1 April 1989.

"Consumers will benefit substantially from opening up the telecommunications market to competition", Prebble told New Zealanders in June 1988. He noted that Telecom's competitors would be heavily dependent on it for facilities and services, giving Telecom scope to act anti-competitively if so wished. He added, however, that he had received an assurance in writing from the head of Telecom, Dr Peter Troughton, that Telecom would facilitate the emergence of a competitive market in telecommunications, and that it would provide interconnection to its facilities on fair terms and conditions.

Telecom's activities and the interconnection agreements, fundamental to the successful entry of competitors, were to be subject to the scrutiny of the Commerce Act 1986. The Department of Trade and Industry was also to act as a watchdog to keep telecommunications on a competitive track.

== Establishment ==
In 1990, Clear Communications made New Zealand history by establishing itself as the country's first telecommunications competitor.

=== Initial interest: 1988 ===
There was a keen interest among state-owned enterprises (SOEs) such as New Zealand Railways Corporation, Electricorp (later ECNZ) and the Broadcast Communications (a subsidiary of Television New Zealand) who saw strong investment opportunities for their microwave, satellite or fibre optic cable capacity. The missing link was the telecommunications switching expertise.

Bell Canada International (BCI), MCI Communications (MCI), Cable & Wireless, British Telecom, Telecom Australia and several other prominent overseas telecommunications suppliers with the technological digital switching expertise the New Zealand-based parties were looking for.

Bell Canada undertook thorough market research and business plan studies in 1988. BCI was moving back into the corporate business of telecommunications and the newly liberalised environment in New Zealand provided the opportunity. Leading New Zealand white wear manufacturer, Fisher & Paykel expressed interest in a joint venture and teamed with BCI in 1989 to investigate the feasibility of an alternate telephone company. Revenues from telecommunications at the time were in excess of NZ$2 billion. Market research showed that most customers would be prepared to change to a competitor if prices were 10 to 20% lower than Telecoms.

Having emerged in September 1988, Broadcast Communications, with its microwave network for disseminating television signals, indicated a strong desire to be part of a BCI and Fisher & Paykel joint venture.

Due to effects of a weakening economy in the late eighties, Fisher & Paykel decided to bow out. The Wellington-based Todd Corporation was preparing for market entry with MCI.

=== Alternative Telecommunications Company ===
Three independently researched business plans undertaken during this first phase of investigation of telecommunications opportunities were combined and expanded upon in an Alternative Telecommunications Company (ATC) business plan proposed by Touche Ross, (for TransPower, the bulk electricity network subsidiary of ECNZ), Booz Allen Hamilton (for New Zealand Railways) and Charles Gilmore, ex-General Manager of Telecom (for Todd Corporation) in March 1989.

The report confirmed that viable competition required a balance of established overseas telephone company expertise, commercial experience and funds, and State Owned Enterprise transmission network infrastructure. It also confirmed that the market place was big enough for just one major competitor to Telecom.

As the various parties began to align with each other, two groups emerged. Broadcasting Communications Limited (BCL), the subsidiary of TVNZ, teamed with BCI to publish a market study and business plan for the establishment of the Alternative Telecommunications Company. TVNZ was looking for the factor with would differentiate their alternate telecommunications company from Telecom.

At the helm of the BCI team was George Newton who had risen from telephone technician to executive level in the Canadian telecommunications giant. George Newton proceeded immediately to draw up the BCI/BCL business plan. With a team of fourteen to assist, he completed it on 8 December 1989, just four weeks after commencement.

By February 1990, BCL, TVNZ and BCI had signed a Heads of Agreement to work in partnership on an alternate telecommunications project. Todd Corporation, New Zealand Railways Corporation and American telecommunications company MCI were poised to do likewise. Both parties were aware of the need for more than one set of transmission facilities. TVNZ's microwave transmission and NZ Railway's fibre optic cable were both needed in the event of one failing. Both parties were also acutely aware that there was room for only one competitor in the New Zealand market.

Todd Corporation had not only struck a firm association with the second largest telecommunications network in the world, MCI, and with New Zealand Railways Corporation but had also been instrumental in persuading the SOEs to work together with encouraging results.

On November 29, 1989, Todd announced the formation of MCI Todd Communications Ltd. The new company would provide competing telecommunications services in New Zealand. Announcing the new company, John Todd, Chairman of the Todd Corporation, said it offered "a great opportunity to bring new technology and service products to the country's 2.4 million telephone users."

The international expertise and investment of MCI, together with New Zealand Railways fibre optic cable running along the North Island Main Trunk railway (between Auckland and Wellington) and the financial support of one of New Zealand's leading corporates constituted serious competition.

=== Todd MCI and BCI/BCL agreement ===
Todd MCI had access to the North Island through New Zealand Railways' fibre optic cable. The BCI/BCL group had access to national coverage through BCL's microwave facility. George Newton convinced BCI's principals in North America to carry on with their venture. In March 1990, all of the parties, TVNZ, Todd, BCI and MCI met in the latter's offices in Washington. This began the merger process.

Both sides had prepared details for interconnection agreements but Neil Tuckwell, an Australian competitive telecommunications expert who had been contracted to TVNZ had, together with Robert Brydon, met the Minister of Commerce to discuss interconnection. In February 1990, the senior representatives of the two groups were brought together - Julian Mounter, Ted Trimmer, Senior Vice President Business Development for MCI, John Hunn, Stewart Berry, Vice President Sales for Bell Canada and George Newton. They worked out what was needed in New Zealand to set up a competitive company and agreed to work together.

On 20 April 1990, a Memorandum of Understanding to form a single organization to compete in the telecommunications industry was signed between the two consortiums. This led to the creation of The Alternate Telecommunications Company (ATC) on 1 August 1990, the four main shareholders being TVNZ, BCI, Todd Corporation and MCI. New Zealand Railways Corporation was to have Board representation and equity options.

The two business plans were then brought together - Todd MCI's venture was going to cost $80 million, and the BCI/BCL venture was to cost an estimated $125 million.

George Newton was appointed Chief Executive of the ATC and he and Robert Brydon, Ted Trimmer, Darryl Dorrington and Neil Tuckwell began work on the agreements needed before the company could begin trading.

Among the eighteen Conditions Precedent, the main ones included a Heads of Agreement with Telecom, a service agreement with BCL and New Zealand Railways Corporation (the Railways Corporation was split into two in October 1990, with the fibre optic circuits going to a new entity, New Zealand Rail Limited) to provide their respective microwave and fibre optic cable facilities, an agreement with TransPower, service agreements with BCI and MCI to contract experienced people from North America, approval from the Commerce Commission and foreign investment approval.

One of the roadblocks for new entrants had been the absence of a specific telecommunications regulatory body. Telecom had established the Permission to Connect (PTC) document, the lifeblood of the business. This meant that the dominant carrier was setting the rules. And since Telecom had not contemplated local service or 0800 service competition, the Agreement with Telecom would prove the most difficult to achieve. Staff en route from North America to join the new ATC told the minister, Richard Prebble, that they would cancel their network switch order due to the delays in getting an agreement with Telecom. ATC then agreed to defer cancelling while the Minister got Telecom to the table.

On 24 August 1990 Telecom had publicly welcomed the merger of the joint ventures and stated that competition was "healthy for the industry and would benefit all our customers." A memorandum of Agreement was signed with Telecom covering toll by-pass, alternative networks, local services and 0800.

A shareholders agreement was concluded and signed on 4 September and shareholders funds, available for the first time, were in excess of NZ$100 million. The four main shareholders would each initially have 25% equity.

ATC's first consignment of switching equipment arrived in New Zealand in November that year and installation commenced. Neil Tuckwell moved from TVNZ over to ATC. His move coincided with ATC's shift from temporary offices at Quay Tower in Auckland to permanent accommodation at 49 Symonds Street. In Wellington, the following month, ATC moved to permanent premises in Murphy Street.

=== Naming and logo ===
The company's General Manager Sales and Marketing David Patten asked Sandy Fain to come up with the company name and logo. Fain briefed Leo Burnett on the company's values. 25 names were considered before arriving at Clear Communications. The logo "reflected the clean, bright colours of New Zealand."

On 14 November 1990, the first full board meeting of the new company was held with John Ede as Chairman of the Board and George Newton CEO. The board confirmed the name which was unveiled to staff on a plinth in the lobby of the company headquarters.

== Commencement of services ==
Clear Communications commenced leased line operations in January 1991. Clear's plan was to make its services available to 80% of telephone subscribers in New Zealand, thus offering New Zealanders a choice of their toll service provider. It developed two separate national toll services; Clear Business 050 to serve the needs of the business market and Clear 051 designed for residential customers. Customers had been tested on the Clear network in April. The new entrant was able to offer toll service bills charged in steps of one-tenth of a minute. Telecom's lowest charge step was one minute.

On 12 February an agreement was signed with Transpower to use their fibre optic system in the South Island and seven days later, Minister of Communications Maurice Williamson, made the first call on the new network, between Wellington and Auckland, using New Zealand Rail's fibre optic cable. At the eleventh hour, when Telecom had still not issued the interconnection permit, Clear took the bull by the horns, went public and got front-page publicity. Telecom had only issued the permit Clear required to link to Telecom's toll system on the evening before the agreed connection date. The interconnection agreement for toll by-pass had been signed on March 4, although a second deal allowing Clear access to Telecom's local services was still being negotiated. Interconnection, the linchpin connecting two or more telecommunications networks, allows calls to flow between them. Full commercial operations offering Clear 051 and Clear Business 050 came on 7 May 1991.

The launch advertising projected the principles of fairness and value. British talk show host Michael Aspel was chosen from a list of 200 to front the advertisements. The advertisements raised were objected to by Telecom who took issue with the application of the word "fair". Two years later Telecom took Clear to court with its advertising headline: "If you want to get the best deal on tolls from Telecom you'd be a Clear customer." The Telecom number was then printed underneath inviting customers to ask for two months of free toll calls to match the current Clear offer.

=== Litigation ===
Clear also sought an injunction to prevent Telecom from misusing a list of Clear customers supplied to Telecom for implementation of no-code access. By mid-1993, Telecom was processing Clear customers at a rate of 3000 lines a week. Telecom began writing to these Clear customers as a part of the marketing campaign, Clear was granted an injunction.

Clear and Telecom were awaiting an Appeals Court decision over the terms for access to the local customer. The original December 1992 court decision found Telecom in breach of Section 36 of the Commerce Act, which prohibits the use of a dominant position for the purpose of preventing or deterring competition. The section underlies the government's telecommunications policy to prevent anti-competitive behaviour.

The two breaches were for not supplying Clear with Direct Dial-In (DDI) numbers which would have allowed Clear to start local service operations, and for asking for too much money for interconnecting Clear to its network. The decision also indicated Telecom's "Baumol-Willig" economic formula - whereby new entrants should compensate Telecom for lost profits - would not be anti-competitive in the future and a framework was proposed which, it was hoped by the court decision, would promote negotiations between Clear and Telecom.

Clear took its objection to this finding back to Court in August 1993 but the resolution of these issues, all related to the cost and terms of access to various parts of the Telecom system, is still awaited. Telecom has argued that the prices it has charged Clear to use its network were fair because of the increments it needed to add to provide the capacity Clear requested. Clear's view has been that Telecom, in the absence of an effective referee has behaved like a de facto regulator. For example, it has practised price bundling whereby monopoly and competitive products are bundled for an overall discount, to the disadvantage of competitors. For as long as that situation was allowed to continue, Clear has maintained that New Zealanders would not reap the full benefits of competitive telecommunications.

A national telephone survey conducted by Insight Research in February 1993 showed that 66% of the 750 people surveyed believed Telecom was taking advantage of its position with only 15% indicating that Clear was getting a fair go. At the same time, almost 70% of the survey participants attributed the benefits in price and service that had been achieved to Clear's competitive stance. Prices for toll calls had reduced by almost half since Clear entered the market.

=== Customer service and new services ===
With the rise of competition came the fall of toll prices and an overall improvement in the level of customer service.

Clear's efficient billing system was the main driver in the differentiation process. The bills went out accurately and on time. Calls not captured within a ninety-day billing period were not charged. Business customers could choose to aggregate their call volumes from multiple locations to maximize savings while still receiving separate account statements for each location. All customers had a choice of billing cycles.

There was a calculated risk and considerable cost in setting new standards of customer service. Credit was offered on a call if a customer was not satisfied. 80% of inquiries were resolved on the first customer contact. Capacity was monitored on individual routes to avoid the blocking of calls. Quality control criteria were designed which were constantly monitored to ensure a standard of service equal to the best available anywhere in the world.

By June 1992, ClearCard and Familiar Voices were launched, followed by telemarketing and PhonePower in July. "Familiar Voices" was a value-added toll system that provided call discounts to customers who nominated people they would be calling on a regular basis. PhonePower provided business consulting and training services to maximize productivity and profits in areas such as sales, marketing, order processing, sales support, customer service and cash management.

The marketing was pitched simultaneously at national accounts (top corporates and government), general and retail business, and residential. Clear promised services 12 to 15% cheaper than had been available from Telecom. For calls both within New Zealand and internationally, the pricing policy was based on charging in one-second increments (after the first minute). Additional benefits were call duration discounts for residential customers during off-peak hours and volume discounts for business customers.

==== ClearCard ====
Clear was first off the telecommunications block with an automated telephone charge card service. Called ClearCard, it allowed Clear customers to make national and international toll (and local) calls over the Clear network from any telephone in New Zealand; and for calls to New Zealand from any telephone in Australia, USA, and UK.

Telecom refused to provide an access number until Clear explained what it was for. Within two months, Telecom had its own card on the market. Clear introduced its toll-free 0508 service, an incoming tolls service that allowed customers to receive calls from anywhere in New Zealand (except for cellular or pay-phones) at no charge to the caller.

=== Market share growth ===
Clear's market share grew faster than predicted. The aim, three years from the launch date, was for 5% market share and a staff of 175. Within six months of commencing operations, Clear attracted more than 30,000 customers. In its first year of operation, it had won 9% of the New Zealand national toll market. By the close of 1993 market share had reached almost 19% and Clear's staff numbered 500. A year later, it achieved the most improved revenue growth among New Zealand's top 200 companies.

By September 1992 Clear had more than 430 staff representing an annual growth of 200 jobs per annum. In the same month, auto telephone dialers were introduced to the market. They were designed to interface with customers' PABX and Telecom lines to ensure that all toll calls would connect to Clear.

The company had more than 14% of the market and over 90,000 customers by November 1992. The growth continued, despite the costly legal battles. Through interconnection with Telecom network, Clear's toll services had become available to more than 80% of the telephone network, Clear's toll service had become available to more than 80% of the telephone lines in New Zealand. Residents in Auckland, Wellington, Christchurch, Dunedin, Whanganui, Palmerston North, Nelson and Invercargill were able to access Clear services. Further locations would come online later in the year to meet Clear's objective to make its services available to all New Zealand telecommunications users.

=== Corporate sponsorship ===
The first major sponsorship Clear made was in January 1992 when Clear joined six other New Zealand companies to sponsor the New Zealand Endeavour yacht in the Whitbread Around the World race.

The $2 million sponsorship was considerable for a small company engaged in expensive battles with Telecom. And because the race would extend over two years and be closely followed by more than 90% of the New Zealanders, it was a logical choice for support. Support for the Crippled Children's Society (CCS) was also given for commercial as well as community reasons. Clear customers were able to contribute to CCS by making calls on the Clear network as part of Friends of CCS fundraising program. When a customer joined the fundraising program Clear donated 3% of his or her monthly bill to CCS.

Similarly, Clear linked with the Pakuranga Rotary Club to encourage the planting of native New Zealand trees with the launch of a national Trees for Survival program. To support the programme, Clear offered an affiliation scheme for Rotarians so that 5% of the Clear toll account would be paid by Clear to the Trees for Survival Programme.

==== Education ====
The important area of education was also selected by Clear for support. Observing the pressure on schools to find the extra money to undertake worthwhile projects, Clear provided parents and members of the community who were Clear customers with a way of directly supporting the primary school of their choice. Friends of the School was launched in Wanganui in September 1992. Clear customers could nominate a primary school on the programme to receive 5% of their monthly Clear toll payment. The Friends of the School programme became nationwide, with 1100 school participating from kindergarten through to high school.

By mid-1993, Clear furthered its commitment to education by sponsoring Spellbound, a spelling quiz that benefited schools financially. An annual school essay with prizes up to $5000 was also launched.

=== 1991 ===
Following interconnection, Clear opened its Christchurch sales office in June 1991. The purchase of the DMS300 switch for international service followed in July and the 10,000th customer signed up in August. Staff numbers had reached 200. Just 12 months before there had been 15 people in Auckland and four in Wellington.

By December, the Dunedin sales office opened, the first direct international service came online with 60 circuits on satellite, quickly followed by expansion to 120 circuits, and Clear's 30,000th customer signed up. In January 1992, Clear's network capacity to Christchurch increased with the commissioning of fibres in the Transpower cable.

In December 1991, Clear began operating the first stage of its own international telecommunications network with the installation of a 7.5 metre Intelsat satellite dish next to Auckland's Carlaw Park. The second dish of 15.5 meters diameter was added in June 1992. Clear was now connected to the new Tasman Fibre optic cable and had direct access to MCI and other carrier networks. The company became virtually independent of Telecom's facilities for most of its international calls.

However, Telecom remained the major obstacle by remaining firm on charging what Clear considered to be less than fair and reasonable interconnection prices. Access to the local market was also stymied by Telecom who owned and controlled most of the critical inputs. Clear contended that by having to pay full commercial rates to Telecom for services provided, it was paying more for equivalent services than many of Telecom's business customers.

The level playing field the government had envisaged was without an effective referee. Telecom was largely calling the shots by setting the rules under which competition was permitted to take place. Many of the subsidiary issues revolved around the fundamental interconnection agreement such as numbering and billing systems, cellular networks, pricing, advertising, directories and local business services.

Telecom agreed to let Clear customers have non-code access (being able to make toll calls through Clear without daily 050) when its share of the national toll market reached 9%. Clear reached the 9% threshold within a year of beginning operations, as opposed to the two to three years anticipated by Telecom. By 1993, Clear was supplying some customers with non-code access but agreement over the cost of access had not been reached. The decision, when finally reached, would determine whether Clear could afford to extend that service to all customers.

=== 1992 ===
Initially, Clear relied solely on Telecom for international calls, but early in 1992 it commissioned independent facilities. It had its own satellite earth receiving station in Auckland and was a member of the Tasman-2 fibre optic cable consortium linking New Zealand and Australia. It was also a member of the consortium owning the PacRim East fibre optic cable between New Zealand and Hawaii.

=== 1993 ===
Clear achieved approximately 22% of market share in domestic toll services by 1993, reduced to 18% by 1999, and 20% for international toll services. Clear's share of the market, by the middle of 1993, had grown to 16% of the national and 18% of the international toll market with more than 170,000 customers. The latter had increased to 200,000 by the time of Clear's third birthday on 4 September 1993, the day the shareholder's agreement was signed. The employees had grown to more than 500 in number.

In August 1993 Clear was selected as one of the finalists for the inaugural NZ Quality Awards.

Chief Executive Andrew Makin succeeded George Newton in August 1993. By the end of 1993, the North American contingent was down for the original 66 to eight.

In November 1993 New Zealand Rail acquired 3.1 million shares in Clear, as part of an option gained by New Zealand Rail for use of its fibre optic cables.

=== 1994 ===
In September 1994 Clear began to provide an 0800 freephone service in competition with Telecom. Prior to this, its freephone service had used the code 0508. In addition to utilizing digital microwave telecommunication links owned by Broadcast Communications Ltd, Clear initially leased, then purchased, from New Zealand Rail (in return for a 15% stake in the company, which New Zealand Rail then sold in 1994) fibre optic cables linking Auckland and Wellington. It also leased fibre optic capacity between Wellington and Christchurch from Electricorp. The company also had digital microwave links with the major provincial cities of New Zealand. It installed further fibre optic capacity between Wellington and Auckland to increase transmission capacity and provide route diversity. Fibre loops and duct lines were installed in the Auckland, Wellington and Christchurch central business districts.

Clear and Telecom had 25 actual and 19 notional points of interconnect (POI) throughout New Zealand. In the areas served by a notional point of interconnect, calls from Clear's customers were trunked to the nearest Telecom telephone exchange with billing facilities, at which point they were physically handed over to Clear. After conveying the call on its own network, Clear linked back into Telecom's network at the appropriate POI.

=== 1995 ===
In September 1995 Clear reached a new agreement on local service interconnection with Telecom which culminated in a formal local telephone service interconnect agreement in March 1996. This agreement also included new toll bypass interconnect arrangements.

=== 1996 ===
In March 1996, British Telecom (BT) acquired Bell Canada's 25% stake in Clear. Clear launched its internet service, ClearNet, later in 1996 and had about 10,000 customers by May 1997. It also provided the first commercial ATM service and had an ISDN offering.

=== 1997 ===
CEO Andrew Makin resigned, and was replaced by Tim Cullinane.

=== 1999 ===
In June 1999, BT bought the whole of Clear. In August, BT paid down Clear's bank debt of NZ$170 million.

=== 2000 ===
In 2000, Clear signed a deal with Vodafone New Zealand to give its customers the use of a mobile network. CEO Tim Cullinane resigned.

=== 2001 ===
Clear was acquired by TelstraSaturn to form TelstraClear for $143 million.

== Information systems ==
Information Systems at Clear was never a "back-office" cost-reduction function - but rather a key strategic element of the business plan.

Bruce Macleod (General Manager of Information Systems) was given responsibility for Clear's Information Systems from the pre-launch (Alternate Telecommunications Company) business plan, through the initial build and start-up stages, the early product launches, the rapid growth and commercial success, and the ongoing competitive differentiation.

In this era before the internet arrived, technology use was generally limited to isolated groups of personal computers, and perhaps a departmental mini-computer or a specialized mainframe. Traditional Telecom companies were typically restricted by this inflexible “vertical silo” style of departmental computer systems.

In contrast, the IS team at Clear designed a forward-looking corporate-wide layered architecture to permit a nimble response to turning creative marketing ideas into operational product realities. Service Features were quickly created by configuring the upper layers of workflow and applications without having to rework the versatile lower layers.

Layered architecture:

- A foundation layer of desktop computers for all, application servers (including mainframes), and interconnecting data networks.
- A middle layer of configurable business applications and databases for Customer Service and Billing, Network Operational Support, Business Planning/Decision Support, and Financial Control.
- A top overlay of operational Business Processes (incorporating both employee and customer workflows)

Upon arrival, all employees were equipped with office services such as Email, file servers, spreadsheets, and project management tools to allow them to quickly engage with the rest of the Clear team on priorities and projects. The centrepiece highly-configurable Customer Service and Billing application was acquired from Telecom USA (a recent MCI acquisition). In each other area, “best of breed” applications and any required hardware and software were acquired from global technology partners and locally adapted to fit needs. The “business process engineering” approach was a key factor recognized in Clear's achievement in the “NZ Quality Awards”.

In keeping with the overall Clear culture, the Information Systems group was organizationally aligned with, co-located, and integrated into the company's comprehensive teams. That is IS-Product Development under Tom Barrett, IS-Network Engineering under Allison Nowlan, and IS-Business/Financial Analysis under Stan Clarke. Another team was dedicated to the design, deployment, and ongoing operation of the foundation technology platform (under Brian Speed and Vlad Ruzicka).

As Clear progressed from start-up to a successful self-sustaining business, the IS Team developed not only the requisite technology investments, but also the required staffing, skills, tools, and processes. The initial experienced “pioneer” North American people noted above gradually transitioned to a strong “next generation” of well-equipped NZ professionals steeped in the distinct Clear corporate culture.
