= ISPANZ =

The Internet Service Providers Association of New Zealand (ISPANZ) is an organisation formed by Internet service providers (ISPs) in New Zealand. Its members include most New Zealand ISPs with the exceptions of Spark, Telstra and Vodafone.

Its objectives are:

- To promote and facilitate the effective functioning of the Internet in NZ as an open system.
- To promote wide connectivity and diverse styles of delivery for the Internet.
- To promote a fully competitive market place for Internet services.
- To inform concerning the possibilities for advancement of Internet services in NZ, and contribute to the wide understanding of the techniques and economics used in providing telecommunications infrastructure for the Internet.
- To encourage diversity, innovation, cooperation and independence for Internet Service Providers, resellers and Internet users in NZ.

== Board ==
ISPANZ is led by a board of directors.

As of December 2021, the board consists of:

- Mark Frater - Director, President
- Shaun Fisher - Director, Vice-President
- Mike Stevenson - Director, Secretary
- Steve Ritchie - Director, Treasurer
- Seeby Woodhouse - Director
- Bruce Trevarthen - Director
- David Haynes - CEO

== Members ==
The current members as of December 2021 are below. A current member list is maintained on the ISPANZ website.

1. Actrix Networks Limited
2. Enhanced Solutions
3. Compass Communications Ltd
4. DTS
5. ICONZ
6. InSPire Net Limited
7. Rexnetworks
8. Netspace
9. NZRS
10. New Zealand Technology Group
11. Primo
12. TrustPower
13. Velocity
14. Woosh
15. Gravity Internet Ltd
16. Kordia
17. Media tribe
18. Ufone
19. Vetta Online
20. Velocity Internet
21. Vital
22. Voyager Internet
23. Wheronet
24. Wizwireless
25. Prodigi Technology Services Ltd
26. Ezyconnecy Rural Broadband

== See also ==
- Broadband Internet access (New Zealand)
