= National Infrastructure Funding and Financing =

NIFFCo's logo

National Infrastructure Funding and Financing Limited (NIFFCo) is a national infrastructure agency and Crown-owned company created by the New Zealand Government to attract funding and financing for infrastructure projects in New Zealand, and addressing the country's infrastructure deficit.

== History ==
=== Predecessors ===
In 2009, the New Zealand Government had created a Crown-owned company called Crown Fibre Holdings to implemented its NZ$1.7 billion Ultra-Fast Broadband programme providing Fibre-to-the-home services to 87% of population. At the time, this marked the largest public-private infrastructure initiative in New Zealand.

Crown Fibre Holdings was subsequently revamped as Crown Infrastructure Partners (CIP). In 2017, CIP was tasked with investigating and implementing commercial models to help the Government develop more water and road infrastructure to accommodate an national increase in housing supply. In 2020, Crown Infrastructure Partners was given oversight over the Government's "shovel-ready projects"during the COVID-19 pandemic in New Zealand.

=== Launch ===
During the 2023 New Zealand general election, the centre-right National Party campaigned on creating a national infrastructure agency. As part of National's coalition agreement with the populist New Zealand First party, the Sixth National Government agreed to establish a national infrastructure agency.

On 28 August 2024, Minister for Infrastructure Chris Bishop announced that the existing Crown Infrastructure Partners would be repurposed as a new national infrastructure agency, which would commence operations on 1 December 2024. This agency would be tasked with serving as a "shopfront" for receiving investment proposals, supporting private infrastructural investment, partnering with agencies and local government on projects involving proving finance, and administering the central government's infrastructure funds. On 30 September 2024, Prime Minister Christopher Luxon listed the creation of a national infrastructure agency as part of the Government's fourth quarterly plan.

The National Infrastructure Funding and Financing Limited (NIFFCo) formally came into existence on 1 December 2024 and assumed CIP's functions and responsibilities. NIFFCo was tasked with partnering with agencies to deliver projects involving private finance, connecting investors to relevant funds and facilitating a "transparent, consistent and efficient" process for infrastructure investment projects.

In early October 2025, cabinet ministers Nicola Willis and Chris Bishop announced that the Government has commissioned NiffCo to explore the feasibility of selling its debt and equity securities in telecommunications company Chorus Limited.
