= New Zealand Telecommunications Forum =

- Predecessor: Telecommunications Carrier Forum and Telecommunications Industry Group
- Formation: 2002
- Type: Incorporated society
- Headquarters: Auckland, New Zealand
- CEO: Paul Brislen
- Website: www.tcf.org.nz
- Formerly called: NZ Telecommunications Carrier Forum

The New Zealand Telecommunications Forum (TCF) is a pan-industry organisation that aims to encourage cooperation and develop standards for telecommunications equipment and services.

Its members include 2degrees, Chorus, One NZ and Spark New Zealand as well as a significant number of smaller players in the New Zealand telecommunications industry.

The TCF is recognised by the government as being the "Telecommunications Industry Forum" referred to in the Telecommunications Act 2001.

The current CEO, Paul Brislen, was appointed in July 2021, and succeeded Geoff Thorne.

== Work programmes ==
In December 2013, the TCF launched a stolen mobile phone blacklisting system with the backing of Telecom (now Spark), Vodafone (now One NZ) and 2degrees.
