= Mills v United Building Soc =

- Court: Court of Appeal of New Zealand
- Full case name: Jason Charles Mills & Lorraine Marjorie Mills v United Building Society
- Decided: 30 September 1988
- Citation: [1988] 2 NZLR 392
- Transcript: Court of Appeal judgment

Court membership
- Judges sitting: Richardson P, Somers J, Casey J

Mills v United Building Soc [1988] 2 NZLR 392 is a cited case in New Zealand regarding what is "misleading or deceptive" conduct under section 9 of the Fair Trading Act [1986].

== Background ==
Mills was interested in purchasing a block of units at a mortgagee auction on behalf of United Building Society.

Whilst Mills at the time was aware that it was a leasehold property, when bidding, he valued it on the basis it was a "Glasgow lease", even though the auctioneer had informed it was a "Friedlander lease", which is an uncommon type of lease in New Zealand.

After buying the property at the auction, Mills was later told by his valuer that this type of lease was worth far less than if it was a Glasgow lease.

Mills tried to rectify the situation by suing the building society for misleading conduct under the Fair Trading Act.

== Held ==
Mills claim was dismissed
