= Saturn Communications =

Telecommunications company of Australia

Saturn Communications is an Australian ICT (Information and communications technology) integrator based in Hobart, Tasmania. They service Southern Tasmania as well as most parts of Northern Tasmania. Saturn Communications are playing a key role in providing services via the nationwide rollout of fibre optics (National Broadband Network) (now in administration and closed).

A New Zealand offshoot, with the same company name as Australia's, was based in Petone in the Hutt Valley. The company built and operated a cable television and telephone services, first in Kapiti, later in and around Wellington and then later in Christchurch, New Zealand. Set up by Jack Matthews, an American expatriate, the company came to be as a result of the deregulation of telecommunications in 1998.

The network was based on Hybrid Fibre Coaxial cable with additional twisted pair cabling to provide telephone services. The network was developed in competition with a network rolled out and later scuttled by Telecom New Zealand known as First Media.

Saturn Communications was originally known as Kiwi Cable Limited and based on the Kāpiti Coast north of Wellington. The company was formed by a local entrepreneur. The company was purchased by Austar an Australian pay television operator and its headquarters moved and an aggressive network rollout planned.

Austar's entry into the New Zealand market was predicated on the fact that prices for cable TV and telecommunications services were sufficiently above the average cost of producing them because of the respective near monopolies of Telecom New Zealand Limited in the local telephone market and Sky Communications in the pay television market. Telecom New Zealand responded aggressively by discounting telephone service in areas where the competing service was available.

After the merger with Telstra Australia in February 2000, there were plans to offer pay television via a satellite DTH (Direct To Home) service due for launch in August 2001 with rollout across the country over the following months however at the beginning of August TelstraSaturn announced that the service was to be put on hold indefinitely.

Saturn's DTH service was to operate on two transponders held by Television New Zealand. A portion of the transponder capacity was to be held by TVNZ for its own free to air broadcasts with the remainder being used for the TelstraSaturn's pay television services.

After the purchase of Clear Communications and by Austar of its shareholding in the renamed TelstraClear the company's focus moved squarely to telecommunications and away from television services, notably reselling existing Telecom services. A programming agreement was struck with Sky Television to broadcast its channels and plans to expand the cable and telephone networks were cancelled as a change in Government lead to the possibility of local loop unbundling.
