= Enable Networks =

Company based in Christchurch, New Zealand

Enable Networks Limited
- Trade name: Enable
- Industry: Telecommunications
- Founded: 2007
- Headquarters: Christchurch Central, Christchurch, New Zealand
- Area served: Christchurch; Lincoln; Rolleston; Templeton; Rangiora; Kaiapoi; Woodend
- Key people: Johnathan Eele (CEO); Justin Murray (Chair)
- Owner: Christchurch City Holdings
- Website: http://www.enable.net.nz

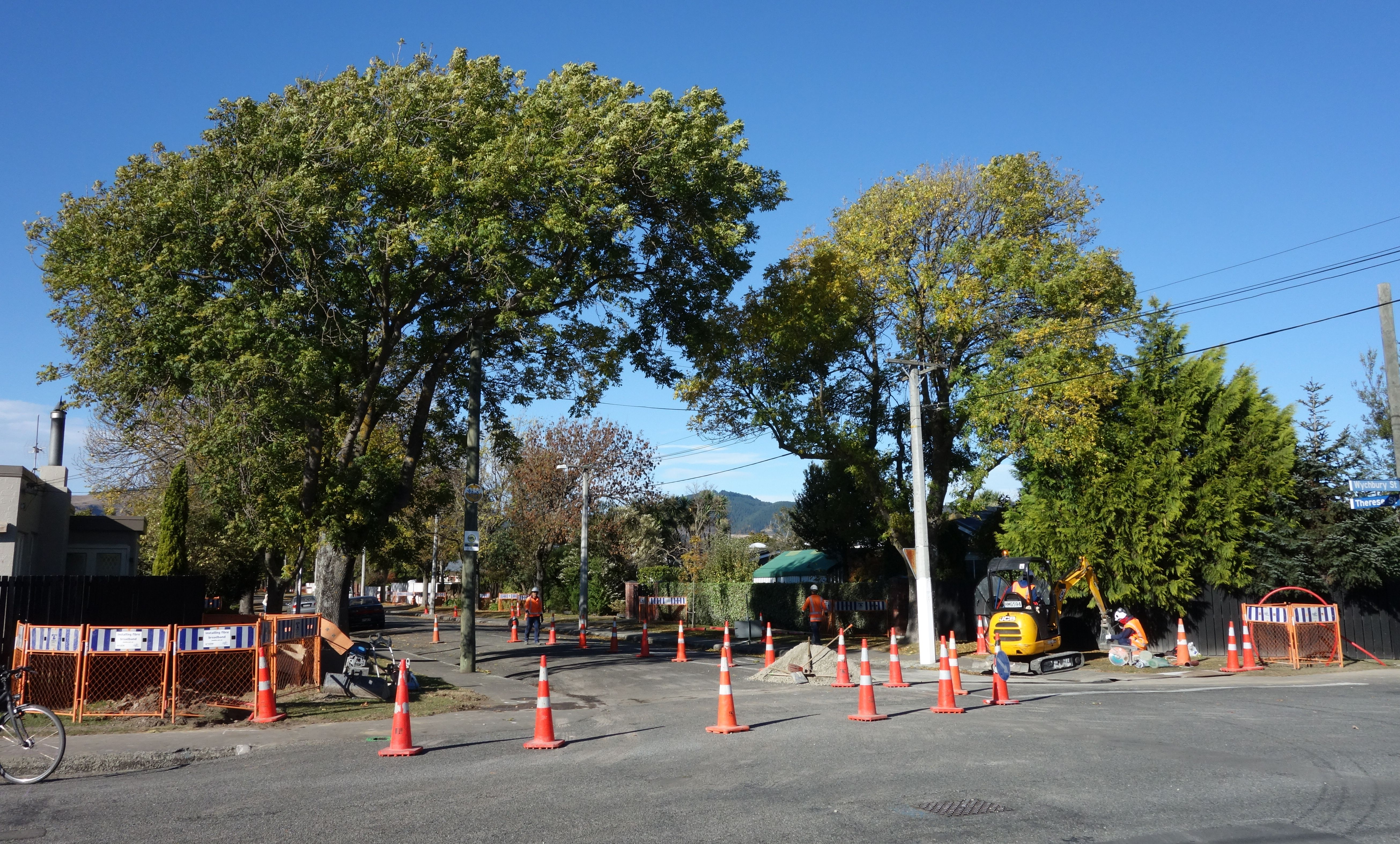
Enable Networks rollout in Therese Street, Spreydon

Enable Networks Limited, trading as Enable, is a company based in Christchurch, New Zealand, that installs a fibre broadband network in Christchurch and surrounding towns, and acts as a wholesaler for retail service providers (RSPs). It is fully owned by Christchurch City Holdings (CCHL), the investment arm of the Christchurch City Council.

== History ==
Enable Networks was first launched in 2007 with funding from CCHL and a grant from the Ministry of Economic Development. Initially launched as Christchurch City Networks Limited (CCNL), in 2009 the company re-branded as Enable Networks and later simplified its trading name to Enable. In 2007, whether or not an area would be served by fibre broadband or not was mostly Telecom New Zealand's decision. As Telecom was trying to get as much out of its existing copper network and upgrades in Christchurch were uncertain, Christchurch City Council decided to set up its own fibre broadband company through its trading arm, Christchurch City Holdings. The initial outcome was a small 150 kilometres (93 mi) network that served 60 schools, health providers and businesses.

There were plans to double the length of the network within three years, but the National Government announced the Ultra-Fast Broadband initiative in 2009. Enable Networks and Chorus Limited, a Telecom subsidiary, tendered for the work. Negotiations with the government took one year and were completed in April 2011, when Enable Networks was assigned the network rollout for Christchurch, Rangiora, Kaiapoi, Woodend, Lincoln, Prebbleton, and Rolleston. Enable partnered with the government's Crown Fibre Holdings on the project, with the city's cost projected to be NZ$203m, and the Crown's cost estimated to be NZ$170. The overall costs were later revised to NZ$440m, with the Crown's contribution lowered to NZ$140m, but their equity stake in Enable Networks was converted to an interest-free loan in June 2016. Enable Networks does not expect to make a profit prior to 2021.

The company's first employee and CEO was Steve Fuller, who had previously been an executive manager at Telecom. Construction under the contract with the Crown started in November 2011. The 50% completion mark was hit in October 2014. In April 2015, uptake was just under 15% of the possible connections.

The government's target date for the rollout was 2019, but Enable announced in October 2014 that it will deliver the network a year earlier, i.e. by 31 December 2018.

In May 2018 Enable Networks completed its network build. Also completing additional areas of Kennedys Bush, Ohoka, Tuahiwi, Clearwater and Tai Tapu.

Enable Networks used Transfield as its key contractor for the network build, but there were serious tensions between the companies. The contract agreement was terminated and instead, an alliance between the companies was negotiated instead. The total network length to be installed in 3,500 kilometres (2,200 mi) and in 2014, the companies managed to install 2 kilometres (1.2 mi) per day.

In November 2021, Enable Networks announced that approximately 90,000 home fibre broadband connections in the greater Christchurch area would receive a permanent speed upgrade from 100 or 200 Mbps plans to faster tiers at no extra cost.

In June–July 2025 the company launched its “Big Fibre Boost” initiative, automatically increasing residential fibre broadband speeds for over 100,000 homes: customers on 50/10 Mbps plans were boosted to 100/20 Mbps, those on 50/20 Mbps to 100/20 Mbps, and customers on 300/100 Mbps plans to 500/100 Mbps.
