= Chorus Limited =

Telecommunications infrastructure provider

- Type: Public
- Traded as: NZX: CNU; ASX: CNU
- Industry: Telecommunications
- Founded: 2011; 15 years ago
- Headquarters: Wellington, New Zealand
- Area served: New Zealand
- Key people: Mark Aue (CEO)
- Products: Telecommunications, fibre optic infrastructure
- Number of employees: 963 (December 2016)
- Website: chorus.co.nz

Chorus is New Zealand's largest telecommunications infrastructure company. It builds and operates nationwide fibre broadband and copper telecommunication networks. It is listed on the NZX and ASX stock exchange and is in the NZX 50 Index.

The company owns the majority of the country's telephones lines, exchange equipment, and is responsible for building the majority of the country's fibre-optic, Ultra-Fast Broadband (UFB) network. As of 2024, the network covers up to 87% of New Zealanders, with at 75% uptake.

By law, it cannot sell directly to consumers, but instead provides wholesale services to retailers.

== Products ==
=== Fibre ===
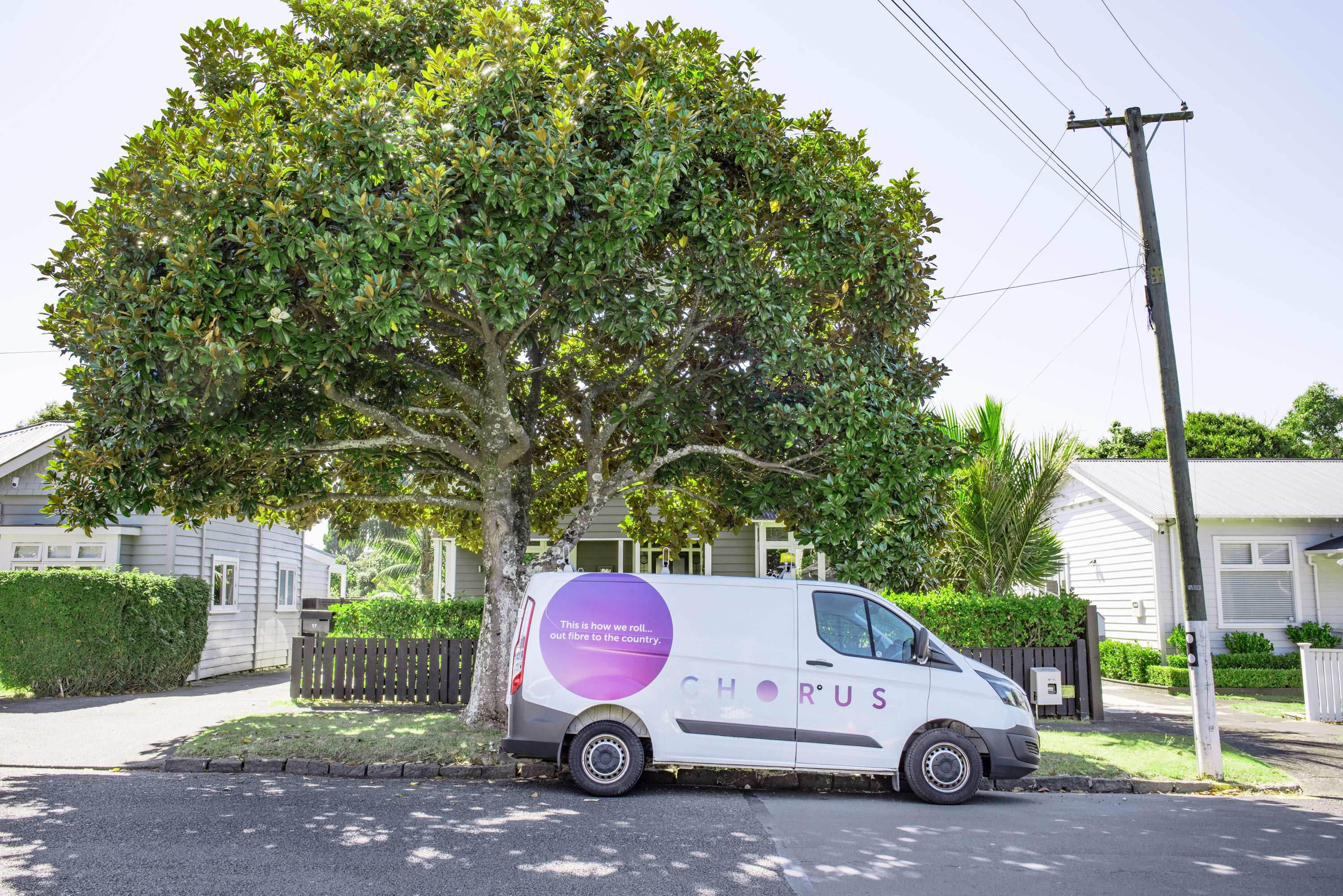
A chorus van with current logo and branding.

Chorus operates an open access network to provide wholesale fibre services to phone and broadband retail providers, alongside city infrastructure such as exchanges and transport.

Ultra-fast fibre broadband initiative

The ultra-fast broadband (UFB) initiative was announced in 2011 by the New Zealand government. The programme was a public-private-partnership between the then Crown Fibre Holdings (now National Infrastructure Funding) and delivery partners, Chorus, Northpower, Enable, and Tuatahi First Fibre.

The initial proposal aimed to build a fibre network out to 75% of New Zealand’s population by 2019, with an investment of $1.35 billion.

UFB2/2+ was announced in 2017, expanding the goal and network’s footprint to 87% of the New Zealand’s population by 2022 – 84% of which was tasked with Chorus.

UFB roll out was completed in December 2022, delivering fibre broadband to 412 towns and cities.

==== Fibre build service agreements ====
In April 2013, Chorus signed contracts with Visionstream and Downer worth NZ$1 billion to build its part of New Zealand's ultra-fast broadband network, after receiving a government subsidy of $929 million. Early in 2014 Transfield Services signed agreements to help build the UFB network. The fibre network footprint was extended twice, with the build work completed by late 2022.

In February 2025, Chorus Limited announced the renewal and extension of its field services agreements with long-standing partners Downer NZ and UCG, in deals collectively valued at approximately NZ$1 billion.

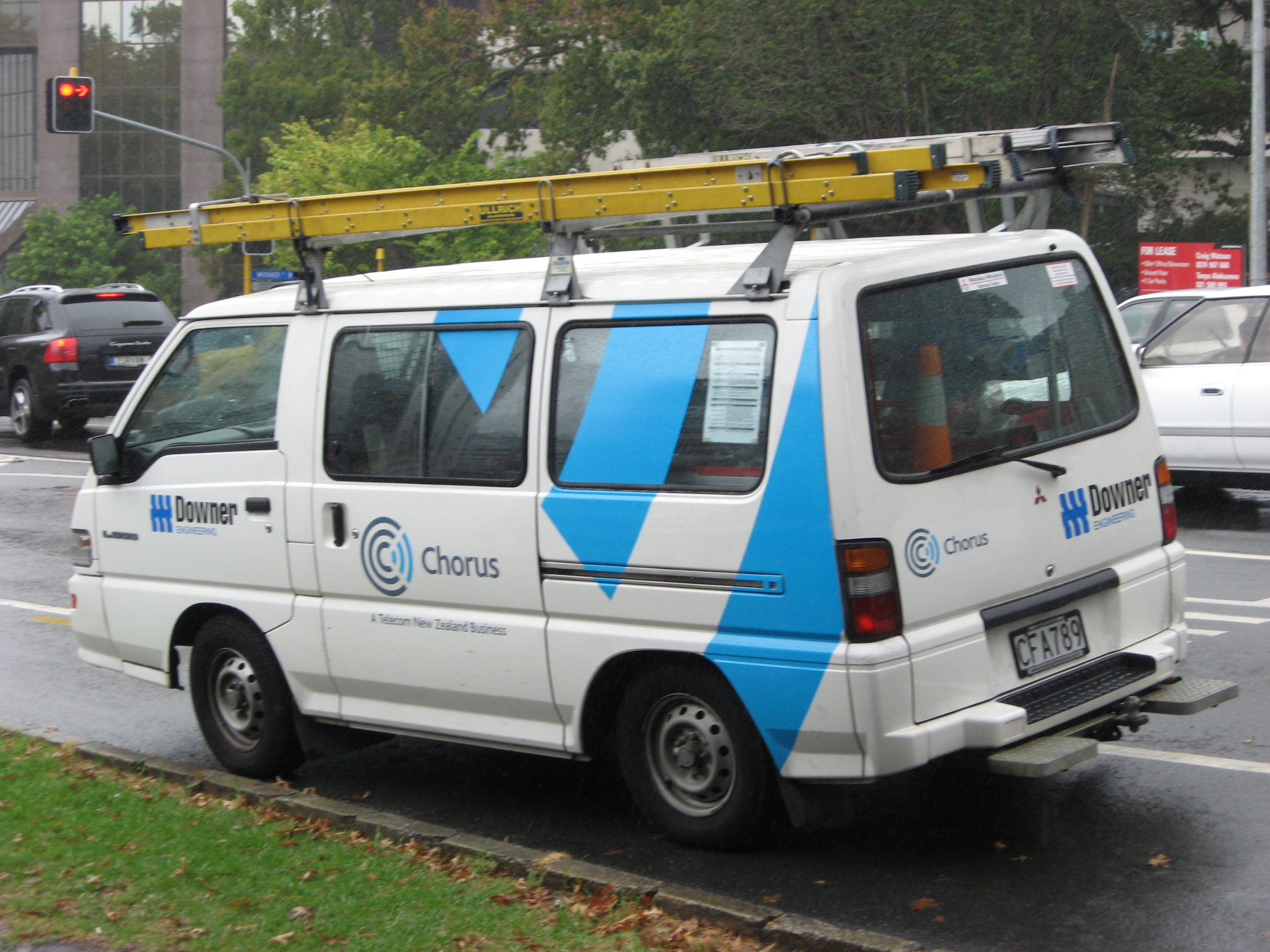
A Chorus van with the former logo

=== Copper ===
Chorus is the owner of New Zealand’s copper network. The network can deliver broadband and phone services to customers. As of December 2024, Chorus reports around 122,000 copper lines remain active.

Contrary to the standard overseas practice of providing full-speed Fibre, Chorus plans differ in the amount of data and speed allocated. As DSL is sensitive to distance, the closer the customer is to the equipment, the faster the connections. Chorus has implemented a fibre-to-the-node (also known as "cabinetisation") project to bring the equipment closer to the user, so 91% of the lines are able to access an ADSL2+ connection of 10 Mbit/s or more.

The copper loop is unbundled, so operators like Vodafone and Vocus can install their own equipment at telephone exchanges and just rent the copper line from Chorus. As of December 2013, 130,000 (7%) lines are unbundled.

==== Copper retirement ====
Copper connections have been steadily decreasing since the fibre-optic network came online, with many in fibre areas choosing to move across.

In November 2018, the Telecommunications act was amended, requiring the New Zealand Commerce Commission to prepare a Copper Withdrawal Code, which came into effect on 1 March 2021. The Code had set out minimum requirements that Chorus must meet before it stops supplying copper services.

An updated Code was published in February of 2024, which refined the 2021 version by streamlining notification requirements and clarifying service replacement expectations, ensuring a smoother transition for consumers as Chorus phases out copper in fibre-ready areas.

In March 2021, Chorus retired a first trial batch of 28 copper cabinets, in densely populated, urban areas where the majority of customers have moved on to the fibre network. Subsequently, it announced intentions to switch off copper cabinets in accordance with the Code, and following the scheduled roll-out of the ultra-fast fibre broadband network. In 2024, Chorus reports it endeavours to retire the copper network by 2030.

Consumer trends in New Zealand show a steady decline in copper network use, particularly in rural areas. A 2022 Federated Farmers survey found 23% of respondents reported declining landline service, mostly on copper, while 20% used satellite broadband and nearly a third accessed landlines via VoIP.

The 2023 Telecommunications Monitoring Report showed rural satellite connections tripled to 34,000 (14% market share), putting New Zealand at the top of the OECD for satellite use per capita. Although 97% of rural copper users are within reach of fixed wireless or WISP networks, around 2,700 remain outside coverage. Rural users reported lower broadband satisfaction (68%) compared to urban users (78%), and Starlink speeds (184 Mbps) far outpaced other rural options. Retail copper prices were also $28 above the OECD average, driven mainly by retail rather than wholesale costs.

== History ==
Telecom created Chorus as a separate business unit in 2008. Chorus was established in 2011. It emerged from the demerger of Telecom New Zealand, as a condition of winning the majority of the contracts for the Government’s UFB initiative.

On December 1, 2011, Chorus was formally separated from Telecom and listed on NZX. Chorus got Telecom's copper lines, cabinets, most telephone exchange buildings, DSLAMs and some fibre back-haul. Telecom retained the relationship with retail customers, the POTS telephone exchange equipment, some fibre back-haul, the shares in Southern Cross cable, the payphone network and the XT mobile network. On August 8, 2014, Telecom was rebranded as Spark.

The original Chief Executive was Mark Ratcliffe, with his executive team including Ewen Powell (CIO), Nick Woodward (Customer Services), Andrew Carroll (CFO), Ed Beattie (Property & Network Operations), Sara Broadhurst (Human Resources).

The company is part of New Zealand Telecommunications Forum.

In November 2021, Chorus Limited launched its “Big Fibre Boost” initiative, increasing its residential wholesale fibre 100 Mbps download/-level plan to 300 Mbps download and significantly boosting upload speed five-fold.

In June 2025, Chorus Limited upgraded its most popular wholesale residential fibre tier from 300/100 Mbps to 500/100 Mbps free of charge for over 700,000 homes across New Zealand.

Simultaneously, the entry-level wholesale plan was increased from 50/10 Mbps to 100/20 Mbps as part of the broader “Big Fibre Boost” initiative by Chorus, delivered at no additional cost to retail service providers.
