= Commerce Act 1986 =

Act of Parliament in New Zealand

New Zealand Parliament
- Long title: To promote competition within markets in New Zealand
- Royal assent: 28 April 1986

Amended by
- 2008
- Status: Current legislation

The Commerce Act 1986 is a statute of New Zealand. It prohibits conduct that restricts competition and purchase of shares or assets where that would lessen competition in a market.

As well as generally governing markets, the Act gives the Commerce Commission particular powers in relation to services provided by electricity lines businesses, gas pipeline businesses and airports.

== Background ==
The Commerce Act 1986 represented the first complete competition law legislation in New Zealand. Previously, the government had attempted to manage markets and competition through ad hoc measures such as price controls and anti-profiteering rules. The Commerce Act was modelled on the Australian competition legislation that existed at that time, the Trade Practices Act 1974 (now the Competition and Consumer Act 2010), which itself had been inspired by the American legislation of the Sherman and Clayton Acts.

== See also ==
- Commerce Commission
