= Commerce Commission =

New Zealand government agency

Commerce Commission Te Komihana Tauhokohoko

Agency overview
- Formed: 1986; 40 years ago
- Type: Crown entity
- Jurisdiction: New Zealand
- Headquarters: Level 9 44 The Terrace Wellington 6011
- Employees: 400 as of January 2023
- Minister responsible: Cameron Brewer, Minister of Commerce and Consumer Affairs
- Agency executives: Suzanne Stew, Chief Executive; John Small, Chair of Commission
- Key document: Commerce Act 1986
- Website: comcom.govt.nz

The Commerce Commission (Māori: Te Komihana Tauhokohoko) (sometimes shortened to ComCom) is a New Zealand government agency with responsibility for enforcing legislation that relates to competition in the country's markets, fair trading and consumer credit contracts, and regulatory responsibility for areas such as electricity and gas, telecommunications, dairy products and airports. It is an independent Crown entity established under the Commerce Act 1986. Although responsible to the Minister of Commerce and Consumer Affairs and the Minister of Broadcasting, Communications and Digital Media, the Commission is run independently from the government, and is intended to be an impartial promotor and enforcer of the law.

The Commission undertakes investigations into potential breaches of the Commerce Act 1986 and where appropriate, takes court action. It considers applications for authorisations and clearances in relation to anti-competitive behaviour and mergers, in circumstances where the public benefit outweighs the harm to competition. In specific areas where it has regulatory responsibilities, such as electricity and gas, the Commission has additional enforcement powers to promote competition and protect consumers.

== History and powers ==
The Commerce Commission was introduced under the Commerce Act 1986 as an integrated regulatory body with responsibilities for competition, economic regulation and consumer protection, modelled after the Australian Trade Practices Commission. The Commission was given the power of enforcing the Commerce Act's prohibitions through court proceedings, and to authorise anti-competitive behaviour and mergers in certain circumstances. One key difference between the Australian and New Zealand regimes is that appeals from the Commerce Commission's decisions are decided by the general courts of New Zealand, unlike Australia where appeals are reviewed by a specialist tribunal.

In March 2026, Commerce Commission announces appointment of Suzanne Stew, as new Chief Executive.

== Composition ==
The Commission is made up of a chairperson and four to six general commissioners. Three to five of the commissioners are appointed by the Governor General, on the recommendation of the Minister of Commerce and Consumer Affairs. A Telecommunications Commissioner is appointed on the recommendation of the Minister of Broadcasting, Communications and Digital Media and has special responsibilities in relation to that sector. As of 2025, the current chairperson of the Commission is Dr John Small, appointed in December 2022 after the expiry of the three-year term of the previous chair, Anna Rawlings.

== Protecting competition under the Commerce Act 1986 ==
=== Investigating and enforcement ===
One of the key roles of the Commission is to ensure markets in New Zealand are competitive, including by investigating anti-competitive behaviour and enforcing compliance. Investigations may involve gathering publicly available information, requesting information on a voluntary basis or compulsory basis, conducting interviews, and executing search warrants. The Commission has a range of enforcement options including the provision of compliance advice or warning letters and by prosecuting a person or business in the High Court. The Commission is responsible for enforcing prohibitions against "restrictive trade practices" (anti-competitive behaviour or conduct that reduces competition), which includes (for example) cartels or price-fixing behaviour, taking advantage of market power, or resale price maintenance.

For example, in 2013, a number of real estate agencies in Hamilton entered into an agreement to adopt a particular pricing model for real estate listings on Trade Me, a New Zealand website. The Commission considered that as a result of these meetings the agencies entered into price-fixing arrangements in breach of section 30 of the Commerce Act, and issued substantial financial penalties against these agencies. Some of the agencies accepted and paid the penalties, whilst others appealed. In April 2020 the penalties were upheld by the Supreme Court. In total, thirteen companies and three individuals were ordered to pay nearly NZ$23 million in penalties.

In April 2021, cartel conduct becomes a criminal offence in New Zealand and can be punished by up to seven years' imprisonment. The Commission will have new powers under the Search and Surveillance Act 2012 such as the ability to apply for surveillance wiretaps.

=== Cartel leniency policy ===
The Commission has a cartel leniency policy to assist in the investigation of anti-competitive arrangements between competitors that are often secret and difficult to detect. The Commission wishes to encourage those involved in cartel conduct to report the cartel to the Commission. The Commission will grant immunity from Commission-initiated prosecution to the first person involved in a cartel to come forward with information and formally apply for leniency, provided they co-operate fully with the Commission in its investigation and prosecution of the cartel. The leniency policy applies to arrangements between competitors which substantially lessen competition. It does not include other kinds of anti-competitive behaviour such as a company taking advantage of a substantial degree of market power or resale price maintenance.

As of January 2021, the Commission is seeking feedback on proposed revisions to its leniency policy to take into account the criminalisation of cartel conduct. It will be renamed the "Cartel Leniency and Immunity Policy". The Commission intends to remain the point of contact for applicants seeking either civil leniency or criminal immunity, but the Solicitor-General will be responsible for deciding whether to grant immunity from criminal prosecution.

=== Authorisations and clearances ===
In addition to enforcement, the Commission has some quasi-judicial functions under the Commerce Act. It can approve anti-competitive behaviour and mergers in certain circumstances, including where an arrangement does not substantially lessen competition or where the public benefit outweighs the harm to competition. These mechanisms offer protection to businesses from any legal action. In the case of a merger, the Commission may grant a "clearance" if satisfied that the transaction is not likely to substantially lessen competition; alternatively, in the case of anti-competitive behaviour or mergers that are likely to substantially lessen competition, the Commission may grant "authorisation" if satisfied that the public benefit outweighs the harm to competition.

=== Market studies ===
In October 2018, new legislative provisions were introduced to enable the Commission to undertake investigations into particular markets to identify anti-competitive behaviour or other competition problems. The provisions included new powers for the Commission enabling it to require private companies to provide information in response to its questions.

The first market study under the new provisions, completed in December 2019, found that New Zealand's fuel market could be more competitive. The government made some initial changes in response to this study, including requiring wholesale prices to be advertised, to enable new entrants to move into the market. In November 2022 the government announced that it would be giving the Commission the power to "set a fair price" in fuel markets if needed, and said that this power would be introduced in mid-2023.

The second study related to supermarkets and food prices and was completed in March 2022, and its recommendations included making land available for building new supermarkets and for existing supermarkets to open their wholesale supplies up to smaller retailers. The Commission did not recommend splitting the two existing supermarket chains or requiring them to sell off existing stores.

The Commission released its third market study report on the building supply market in December 2022. It identified rebates paid by large suppliers and the regulatory system as being the main drivers of the lack of competition in this market.

== Consumer protection ==
The Commission enforces some of New Zealand's consumer protection laws.

=== Fair Trading Act 1986 ===
The Fair Trading Act 1986 was developed alongside the Commerce Act to encourage competition and to protect consumers from misleading and deceptive conduct and unfair trading practices. The Act applies to all aspects of the promotion and sale of goods and services, including for example advertising, pricing, sales techniques and finance agreements.

The Act also applies to pyramid schemes, and provides for consumer information standards covering country of origin labelling, clothing and footwear labelling, fibre content labelling, care labelling and supplier information notices relating to motor vehicles. The Commission also enforces six product safety standards relating to baby walkers, pedal bicycles, flammability of children’s night clothes, cigarette lighters, household cots and toys for children aged up to three years.

=== Credit Contracts and Consumer Finance Act 2003 ===
The Commission assumed responsibility for enforcing the major provisions of the Credit Contracts and Consumer Finance Act 2003 on 1 April 2005. This Act repealed the Credit Contracts Act 1981 and the Hire Purchase Act 1971, placing obligations on creditors with respect to disclosure requirements; calculation of fees, charges and interest; and oppressive conduct. It also enables consumers to seek reasonable changes to credit contracts on the grounds of unforeseen hardship. The part of the Act which relates to oppressive contracts known as buy-back transactions was enacted on 14 October 2003 and was already enforced by the Commission prior to April 2005.

In 2011, former National Finance director and convicted fraudster Trevor Allan Ludlow was the first person to be indefinitely banned by the Commission from working in the consumer finance industry.

== Regulated industries ==
The Commerce Commission has a role in the regulation of some markets where there is little or no competition. The markets where the Commission is currently involved include: electricity transmission and distribution, gas transmission and distribution, telecommunications, airports and the dairy industry. Part 4 of the Commerce Act contains specific provisions for regulation in these markets with a purpose of promoting outcomes that are consistent with outcomes produced in competitive markets such that suppliers of regulated goods or services:

- have incentives to innovate and to invest, including in replacement, upgraded, and new assets; and
- have incentives to improve efficiency and provide services at a quality that reflects consumer demands; and
- share with consumers the benefits of efficiency gains in the supply of the regulated goods or services, including through lower prices; and
- are limited in their ability to extract excessive profits

For example, input methodologies are rules and processes determined by the Commission and applied to regulated businesses under Part 4 of the Commerce Act. These input methodologies provide the basis for how prices are set for electricity lines, gas pipelines and airport services. Their purpose is to ensure certainty for suppliers and consumers in these regulated industries.

=== Dairy Industry Restructuring Act 2001 ===
The Commission has both enforcement and adjudication roles under the Dairy Industry Restructuring Act 2001. The Act provides for the Commission to undertake enforcement action and requires the Commission to issue determinations to resolve disputes between Fonterra and other parties.

=== Telecommunications Act 2001 ===
The Commission has two primary functions under the Telecommunications Act 2001 that help to ensure broadband and mobile markets are competitive. The first is to regulate certain fixed-line and mobile services by setting the price and/or access terms for that service. The second is to monitor and report on competition, performance and developments in telecommunications markets. The Commission is also responsible for allocating the exact amount telecommunications providers must pay in Government levies each year.
