= Internet in New Zealand =

Internet access is widely available in New Zealand, with 94% of New Zealanders having access to the internet as of January 2021. It first became accessible to university students in the country in 1989. As of June 2018, there are 1,867,000 broadband connections, of which 1,524,000 are residential and 361,000 are business or government.

Fibre to the home (FTTH) accounts for 32% of connections, and FTTH was accelerating rapidly with 54% growth in 2018. Digital subscriber line (DSL) over phone lines provides 44% of connections (down 16% in 2018) and cable internet, mobile broadband, fixed wireless and satellite broadband account for the remaining quarter of connections. Fibre to the home is provided through New Zealand's Ultra-Fast Broadband program, started after 2008 with a target of 87% of the population by 2020. FTTH is available to 67% of New Zealanders.

The phone and fibre networks are mostly owned by network company Chorus Limited, which wholesale services to retail ISPs. Parts of Wellington, Kapiti and Christchurch have cable internet access from One NZ, but this is being retired. Nearly all of the population is covered by 4G and 5G mobile broadband. 3G broadband is being retired, and due to be completed by mobile providers by April 2026. 3G frequencies are being refarmed for 4G and 5G. Satellite internet is available throughout the country.

As of February 2026, Ookla reports the average download speed for fixed broadband as 201.72 Mbit/s and the average upload speed as 92.9 Mbit/s (ranked 35th in the world). This measurement is up from Q1 2017, when Akamai reported an average peak download speed of 70.8 Mbit/s (35th). For mobile broadband, as of March 2020, Ookla reports the average download speed as 53.59 Mbit/s and the average upload speed as 14.49 Mbit/s, ranking it 13th in the world. Broadband pricing is at, or above the OECD average, and most connections have an unlimited data cap. There are more than 80 ISPs, with two of them having three-quarters of the market. The New Zealand Government has funded two broadband expansion initiatives, with the aim of providing fibre to the home for 87% of the population and bringing broadband to 97.8% of the population by 2019. International connectivity is mainly provided by the Southern Cross Cable.

== Retail services ==
Nominal broadband speeds (as of October 2018)
Speed (Mbit/s)	Percentage
Download
< 8	<1%
8-24	3%
24-50	47%
50-99	19%
> 99	29%
Upload
<10	22%
10-20	49%
>20	28%

As at 2018, there were 829,000 DSL connections (down from 1.3 million in 2015), 44% of the broadband total, and 598,000 (up from 105,000) fibre connections, 32% of the total. There are also 441,000 (down from 485,000) cellular, satellite, cable and fixed wireless connections comprising 24% of the total.

=== DSL ===
Most of the telephone infrastructure is owned by Chorus. Chorus provides ADSL (up to 8/1 Mbit/s), ADSL2+ (up to 24/1 Mbit/s) and VDSL2 (up to 100/50 Mbit/s or 70/30 Mbit/s) services over the copper phone network.

Most connections are at full line speed, and although monthly data transfer caps used to be common, most plans are now unlimited. As DSL is sensitive to distance, the closer the customer is to the equipment, the faster the connections. Chorus has implemented a fibre-to-the-node (also known as "cabinetisation") project to bring the equipment closer to the user, so 91% of the population is able to access a DSL connection of 10 Mbit/s or more. As of January 2014, 97.3% of phone lines are capable of accessing ADSL and 62.4% are capable of VDSL2.

As of February 2020 Chorus' DSL footprint has shrunk considerably, due to migration to FTTH networks operated by Chorus and other providers. DSL connections are down to 600,000 (from a peak of over 1.2 million in 2014).

Chorus does not sell services directly to customers, instead, they wholesale services to internet retailers at regulated prices. (Note: VDSL2 pricing is not regulated.) In addition to ISPs being able to use Chorus' infrastructure, the copper loop is unbundled, so operators like One NZ, Compass and CallPlus (Slingshot/Orcon) can install their own equipment at telephone exchanges and rent just the copper line from Chorus. As of December 2013, 131,000 (8%) lines are unbundled.

=== Fibre ===
Fibre to the home was rolled out to urban areas of the country via the Ultra-Fast Broadband scheme, starting in 2014, and ending in December 2022. The network was constructed using Gigabit-capable Passive Optical Networks (GPON) technology, which is reliable, comparatively low-cost and has been used in projects such as Google Fiber.

The UFB project was completed in December 2022, bringing high-speed fibre broadband to 412 towns and cities, with an uptake level of 73%. Residential plans were between 30/10 Mbit/s and 8000/8000 Mbit/s, with 8000 Mbit/s (8 gigabit) services made available to approximately 150,000 premises in Auckland and Wellington. As of July 2021, there are 92 retailers of UFB services.

P2P fibre is available in business areas of the cities from several companies, including Chorus, One NZ, CityLink and Vector.

=== Cable ===
One NZ has a DOCSIS 3.1 hybrid fibre-coaxial network covering parts of Kapiti, 85% of Wellington and almost two-thirds of Christchurch, a total of 145,000 homes. There are about 60,000 customers on the cable network. It provides plans of 200/20 Mbit/s and 1000/100 Mbit/s.

=== Mobile ===
There are three physical mobile networks in the country. One NZ provides 4G coverage to 99% of the population, and 5G coverage to 69% of the population and Satellite to mobile outside cell site coverage. Spark provides 4G and 5G coverage to 99%. 2degrees has 4G coverage to 86% of the population.

=== Fixed wireless ===
One NZ offers a fixed wireless service provided over 4G and 5G in rural areas under the government-subsidized Rural Broadband Initiative scheme. As a condition of the subsidy, One NZ also wholesales this service to other retailers. One NZ also offers a fixed wireless service in urban areas with monthly plans over 4G and 5G.

Spark (and low cost brand Skinny) also offer a fixed wireless service over 4G (5G is offered at no extra cost for eligible customers) in both urban and rural areas. Spark began moving low usage customers off copper connections onto the fixed wireless service in 2017. Spark and low cost brand Skinny offer an unlimited fixed wireless plan. As of Feb 2018 there were 104,000 customers on Spark's fixed wireless service.

Woosh once offered a fixed wireless service in Southland until 1 July 2016 when it closed the business. It used a proprietary TDD-CDMA technology by IP Wireless that was no longer supported by vendors. The maximum speed was 1.6 Mbit/s.

There are Wireless Internet Service Providers (WISPs) covering regional rural areas, with about 40,000 customers. They typically use the unlicensed 2.4 and 5.8 GHz bands. WISPA-NZ – or more fully the Wireless Internet Service Providers Association of New Zealand Inc – was established in January 2017. They received funding for expansion in August 2017 from the governments RBI2 program.

=== Satellite ===
Satellite broadband is available throughout the country from Farmside (using IPSTAR), and Gravity using JCSAT-3A (then Kacific-1 when launched in late 2019).

=== Dial-up ===
In 2018 dial up was less than 1% of all connections in NZ compared with 7% in 2012. In April 2017, Spark NZ announced plans to replace all Public Switched Telephone Network (PSTN) exchanges with new IP equipment within 5 years. Dial up will not be supported. In May 2018, Spark withdrew dial up services. Followed by One NZ (formerly Vodafone) in May 2021

== Government broadband upgrade plan ==
The government has two plans to bring fast broadband to 97.8% of the population by 2019.

=== Ultra-Fast Broadband Initiative ===
The Government is spending NZ$1.35 billion on public-private partnerships with Chorus and three local electricity network companies to roll out fibre-to-the-home connection in all main towns and cities with population over 10,000. The programme aims to deliver ultra-fast broadband capable of at least 100 Mbit/s download and 50 Mbit/s upload to 75% of New Zealanders by 2019. In total, 1,340,000 households will be connected.

In 2015, the Government launched a $152 million to $210 million extension of the original UFB programme, with the aim of extending UFB programme coverage from 75 per cent to 80 per cent of New Zealanders.

=== Rural Broadband Initiative ===
The government awarded a $300 million Rural Broadband Initiative (RBI) contract to Vodafone and Chorus to bring broadband of at least 5 Mbit/s to 86% of rural customers by 2016. Vodafone will install 154 new cell towers and upgrade 387 towers, adding 250,000 addresses to its 3G coverage. As of June 2015, 116 new towers have been installed and 314 towers upgraded, covering approximately 242,814 addresses. As of June 2014, there are 6064 customers on the RBI wireless network. By January 2016, Vodafone was actively extending its 4G network, and on track to deliver speeds as high as 100 Mbit/s. Chorus will provide fibre to the new Vodafone towers, 1040 schools, 183 libraries and 50 health providers. Chorus will also be upgrading or installing 1215 new cabinets to increase GPON, VDSL and ADSL coverage to 100,969 lines. As of June 2015, 93,348 lines have been upgraded, with an 80% uptake rate.

In 2015, in addition to expanding the coverage of the UFB programme, the government also launched a further $100 million investment to expand the RBI, and $50 million to improve mobile coverage in black spot areas.

In August 2017 Crown Infrastructure Holdings, now part of National Infrastructure Funding and Financing entered into contracts with the Rural Connectivity Group and with a number of Wireless Internet Service Providers to deliver the RBI2/MBSF programme.

== Data caps ==
Data caps (as of October 2014)
Data cap (GB/month)	Connections	Percentage
< 5	204,000	11
5-20	64,000	3
20-50	492,000	26
50-100	411,000	21
>100	125,000	6
None	628,000	33

Monthly data caps used to be common in New Zealand, with over 90% of connections having caps in 2014. As of June 2018, less than 30% of internet connections now have a fixed data cap. Once users have exceeded their data cap, they typically have the option of having the speed limited to 64–128 kbit/s for the rest of the month or paying for any extra data used. Now, most RSP's (retail service providers) offer unlimited data plans. On average (August 2019), each household uses 265 GB of data per month.

Most mobile phone data plans have set caps, with any excess paid for per MB (although extra data blocks can be purchased to avoid the expensive casual data pricing). As of 2014, Vodafone claimed its cellular data network is the fastest in the world, with downloads of 5 to 20 Mbit/s on 3G and 20 to 75 Mbit/s on LTE 4G being usually available. In April 2017, 2degrees announced unlimited data plans as part of a plan with unlimited calls and texts.

== Internet service providers ==
As of October 2014, there were about 80 internet service providers. 16% had fewer than 100 customers, 41% had 101 to 1000 customers, 28% had between 1001 and 10,000 customers, 7% had 10,001 and 100,000 customers and 4% had more than 100,000 customers. 28% of ISPs wholesale bandwidth to other ISPs and 24% sell packages to other ISPs for resale.

In the first quarter of 2020, the ISPs with more than 1.0% market share (in brackets) were: Spark (including sub-brand Skinny) (40%), One NZ (21%), Vocus Group (including Slingshot and Orcon) (13%), 2degrees (7%), and Trustpower (6%).

== Pricing ==
As of February 2015, three unlimited UFB plans can be purchased: NZ$79 per month for a 100 Mbit/s downlink and 20 Mbit/s uplink plan, NZ$99 per month for a 200 Mbit/s downlink and 20 Mbit/s uplink plan and NZ$129 per month for a 1 Gbit/s downlink and 500 Mbit/s uplink plan.

The Commerce Commission, which is responsible for telecommunications regulation, performed a comparison of broadband prices in New Zealand with prices in OECD and OECD-like countries. The data used is from June 2013.

Technology	Minimum Speed	Data cap	Phoneline included	Price (NZ$ PPP)		NZ rank/ Plans compared
Technology	Minimum Speed	Data cap	Phoneline included	NZ	OECD	NZ rank/ Plans compared
DSL/Cable	10Mbit/s	30GB	Yes	75	60	17/28
DSL/Cable	10Mbit/s	60GB	Yes	90	65	22/27
DSL/Cable	10Mbit/s	150GB	Yes	99	80	24/27
DSL/Cable	10Mbit/s	30GB	No	55	59	16/34
DSL/Cable	10Mbit/s	60GB	No	56	58	15/33
DSL/Cable	10Mbit/s	150GB	No	75	61	24/33
Fibre	30Mbit/s	30GB	Yes	95	100	14/19
Fibre	100Mbit/s	150GB	Yes	139	100	14/15
Mobile	not specified	1.5GB	No	29	26	23/34
Mobile	not specified	6GB	No	98	46	33/34

98% of New Zealanders have access to affordable broadband, according to the ITU's 2014 measure of broadband costing less than 5% of average income.

With the increased competition in the broadband sector in New Zealand and the growing number of broadband plans and ISP's, 2016 saw the launch of a dedicated broadband comparison website in January 2016, glimp which was the first of its kind in New Zealand. Followed by the launch of Broadband Compare in June 2016.

== History ==
=== Early days ===
By 1978 a national network had been established at the then Department of Scientific and Industrial Research (DSIR). This network linked the disparate campus "mainframes" around the country via PDP/11 and LSI/11 machines linked together over 9600bit/s "S2" circuits leased from the New Zealand Post Office. Due to the Telecommunications Act, the DSIR was not able to link all the research institutions together (MAF Research, the universities and other non-DSIR research institutions).

In the mid-1980s, with the advent of the Post Office's packet-switching network based on X.25, and a degree of de-regulation, it became possible to link the various institutions together at a cost. In 1985 and 1986 a number of meetings were held by the various research institutions to plan for a broad-based research network that would provide basic research electronic communication (mail, file sharing and remote access). It was agreed to base this on the UK's Joint Academic NETwork (JANET) "Blue Book" standard rather than the US's ARPANET standard. The UK academic community defined the Coloured Book protocols as "interim" X.25 standards, intended to be used until international agreement was reached on an international standard (see Protocol Wars). These Coloured Book protocols gained some acceptance internationally as the first complete X.25 standard, with "several years lead over other countries" (see Internet in the United Kingdom § Early years). (Note: JANET began operation in 1984, two years before the NSFNET in the United States.)

The impetus for development came from the DSIR, especially the newly formed Division of Information Technology in 1985 under Dr's Crouch, March, Nield and Whimp and from the Universities, in particular the University of Waikato, and John Houlker. By 1987, everything was in place except international traffic. The controllers of funding refused to approve the $250,000 cost for the link across the Pacific to the United States. Due to the efforts of John Houlker, New Zealand's first international internet connection was established in 1989 from Waikato University through IBM. The capacity went from 64 kbit/s to 128 kbit/s between February 1993 and February 1994.

=== Free ISPs ===
At the start of the millennium, there were a number of ISPs offering free dial-up internet to users. Unlike free ISPs overseas, these did not rely on advertising or e-commerce revenue, but instead were funded by interconnection charges.

In 1996, Telecom NZ and Clear Communications (until then only a toll-bypass provider) signed an interconnection agreement, where each would pay the other 2 cents/minute to terminate "local" calls, reducing to 1 cent/minute over several years. Telecom believed they had the upper hand, as (a) local calls were regulated to be zero-rated to the subscriber, and (b) they held the vast majority of subscribers to whom calls could be placed, and so expected a significant net inward revenue stream.

However when in 2000 Clear offered a revenue sharing arrangement to customers who signed on exclusively to receive calls, a number of ISPs were quick to take advantage of this offer. The first was Compass Communications, which set up Freenet in February 2000, followed quickly by i4free (by CallPlus), surf4nix, Zfree (by Clear itself), and Splurge (by Quicksilver). They in turn could offer "free" dial-up internet to their customers, with Telecom ultimately footing the bill for "local" (free) calls.

The result was that Telecom wound up paying interconnection fees to Clear totalling tens of millions of NZ dollars.

These free ISPs had quite an impact on the New Zealand ISP market, cutting Xtra's market share by 10% during the time they were operative.

Within a few months Telecom remedied the situation by fiat: they declared that "internet calls" were not "local", and although they would still be free to the customer, they would no longer attract interconnection fees. To enforce this, all existing advertised phone numbers for dial-up services were blocked, and the ISPs were required to use new numbers starting with 0867. (The legality of this decision was still before the courts as of 2010.) Clear stopped paying the ISPs, and they in turn shut down their "free" services. Zfree (Clear's own in-house ISP) was the last free ISP to shut down, in July 2002.

=== First broadband ===
In 1999 Telecom New Zealand began providing broadband internet (ADSL) under the name JetStream. There was a progressive roll out into local exchanges. JetStream services were offered by many different ISPs, with Telecom billing for all data usage and the ISP charging for authentication and other services such as a static IP address. Home users were offered 'starter' plans at 128 kbit/s upload and download. Speeds greater than 128 kbit/s were extremely expensive and extra data (beyond the allowance) was charged at over $0.10 per MB. Telecom progressively introduced lower cost home options. Businesses were able to access 'full speed' services at up to 8 Mbit/s downstream and 800 kbit/s upstream, with data charges up to $0.20 per MB.

During March 2004 a 256 kbit/s home service was introduced with a 10 GB allowance for NZ$700.

In 2005 the government mandated Unbundled Bitstream Service (UBS) at a maximum upstream bandwidth of 128 kbit/s. This allowed ISPs to bill for their client's data usage. Telecom initially specified a 256 kbit/s downstream, but added 1 Mbit/s and 2 Mbit/s options later in the year. Telecom provided this in addition to the existing Jetstream plans.

In late 2005 Telecom cancelled its previous wholesale arrangements for JetStream and its plans with other ISPs. Only Telecom's own ISP, Xtra, could sell plans faster than the UBS options.

In February 2006 Telecom announced its intention to offer a speed upgrade on their wholesale. It was reported that some providers would likely reject the offer, though Telecom believed that negotiations were continuing well.

In April 2006, Telecom New Zealand introduced new cheaper services with download speeds up to 3.5 Mbit/s, some thought this was to avoid regulatory local loop unbundling. In May 2006 local loop unbundling was announced as part of a comprehensive telecommunications package.

=== Monopoly concerns ===
In the early 2000s, Telecom's control of telecommunications infrastructure was being criticised by lobby groups such as the Telecommunications Users' Association of New Zealand and Internet New Zealand.

In early 2006, there were growing concerns about below par broadband in New Zealand. On the whole, Telecom's upstream speeds (128 kbit/s) and data caps had resulted in New Zealand's internet connections being ranked unfavourably compared to other countries in the OECD. Competitors were making some changes such as offering higher data caps (XTRA's data caps averaged from 1 to 10 GB of data per month, while competitors such as ihug offered 40 and 60 GB options, or Xnet who offered free national data on their ADSL plans.) In mid 2006, Telecom still had control over the network including speeds and how much data they supplied each "UBS" customer.

Amidst growing pressure from the government, Telecom boosted downloads to 3.5 Mbit/s and uploads to 512 kbit/s (at high costs such as $20/month more just for increased upload speeds). Competitors and customers reported slower than expected speeds, with one ISP director criticizing Telecom's backhaul network. The new plans were also criticised for reducing the data caps on downloads.

=== Unleashing speeds ===
In May 2006, the government announced a comprehensive telecommunications package including unbundling of the local loop to allow other ISPs to compete more effectively against Telecom's DSL offerings. The New Zealand Institute think-tank has estimated that the economic benefits of competitive broadband access could be worth as much as NZ$4.4 billion a year to New Zealand's gross domestic product.

On 26 October 2006, Telecom "unleashed" the download speeds on their network, meaning download speeds went as fast as the lines could go. Additionally, there was also an unlimited download plan, which was also uncapped, however 128 kb upload, and a fair usage policy which is put in place to temporarily limit the speeds for customers who have high usage or make use of peer-to-peer connections via traffic shaping – basically limiting a so-called "unlimited" plan. This plan only lasted for a few months until it became clear that Telecom were restricting all traffic (not just peer-to-peer) during all times of the day (instead of the 8 peak hours per day stated). Because of this, all subscribers on the so-called "Go Large" plan were given a refund for up to 2 months worth of service, and the plan was eventually made no longer available to new subscribers.

In March 2007, Telecom started to introduce ADSL2+ into local exchanges through their roll-out programme.

=== Local loop unbundling and the structural separation of Telecom ===
The government mandated local loop unbundling in 2006, thus allowing other ISPs to set up their own infrastructure and services, and using only Telecom's existing copper wiring and exchanges. Several countries have done similarly to compete more effectively with the incumbent's offerings. They also mandated naked DSL and unconstrained UBS (which may see rapid changes in ISP offerings). Then Telecommunications Minister David Cunliffe expected that the market would feel the effects from 2007 to 2009, with policy to be enacted commencing at the Budget in May 2006. As a part of the policy, the Government was to take steps to encourage private sector investment in improving rural telecommunications services, and to further open up the marketplace to alternative delivery media, such as fibre optics, cable and satellite.

Telecom had a monopoly on the local loop for a long time. There were alternatives such as CityLink in the Auckland and Wellington CBDs, TelstraClear's cable internet in Wellington and Christchurch, satellite, and wireless in some locations – but products based on Telecom/Chorus's DSL were the norm, as other networks did not have the same coverage nor pricing the DSL network had.

In December 2011, Telecom NZ was split into a retail company (later renamed Spark), and Chorus, a separate infrastructure company. Chorus completed a fibre to the node roll out in towns and cities with exchanges that have more than 500 lines in early 2012.

Vodafone NZ became Telecom's biggest competitor after acquiring ihug in 2006 and then acquiring TelstraClear in 2012. TelstraClear invested heavily in infrastructure throughout New Zealand by laying fibre networks in areas in Wellington, Nelson, and Christchurch. Vodafone continued to build a fibre backbone throughout New Zealand.

=== Recent developments ===
In June 2013, Google started testing Project Loon in Canterbury, a plan to provide internet services via large helium balloons around the globe.

In mid 2015, Vodafone started upgrading its Rural Broadband Initiative network to 4G, while Spark also launched a rural 4G broadband service.

In July 2015, Woosh sold its customers in Auckland, Wellington and Christchurch to Slingshot (owned by Australian company M2), leaving only its operation in Southland. The Southland operations ceased on 1 July 2016, after Woosh went into voluntary administration.

In October 2015, the Government announced an aspirational target that 99% of New Zealanders will be able to access broadband at peak speeds of at least 50 Mbit/s by 2025. The remaining 1% would get at least 10 Mbit/s.

== High-speed networks ==
Kiwi Advanced Research and Education Network (KAREN) was set up in 2006 to link universities and Crown Research Institutes within New Zealand via fibre-optic cable, with links to Sydney and Los Angeles via the Southern Cross Cable, at speeds of up to 10 gigabits per second (or 1 gigabit per second to Los Angeles and Sydney).

Starting in 2013, Chorus ran a (now ended) "Gigatown" competition. Residents in Dunedin, the winning town, will get a 1Gbit/s connection at the price of a normal connection.

Weta Workshop, Weta Digital and Wingnut Films in Wellington have high-speed links provided by CityLink.

== International connections ==
=== Current ===
Most of New Zealand's current international connectivity is provided by three under-sea fibre optic cables with a combined total throughput of 73 terabits per second.

1. The Southern Cross Cable (10 Tbit/s) operated by Southern Cross Cables Limited was founded in 1997 by agreement between Telecom New Zealand (50%), Optus (40%) and MFS Globenet (10%) (subsequently acquired by WorldCom, and then Verizon Business). Southern Cross owns and operates a trans-Pacific submarine cable network connecting Australia, New Zealand, Fiji and Hawaii to the internet backbone on the United States West Coast.Completed in February 2001 has a current capacity of 5.4 Tbit/s. The network is 30,500 km in length, There are nine cable landing stations (two each in Australia, New Zealand, Hawaii and the US mainland, and one in Fiji) and additional access points in San Jose, Palo Alto, Los Angeles, and Seattle as well as Sydney. Both cables in the network contain six optical fibres (3 fibre pairs) between Sydney and Hawaii, and eight fibres (4 fibre pairs) between Hawaii and the US West Coast.
2. The Tasman Global Access (20 Tbit/s) was completed March 2017 and is 2288 km long with landing points in Ngarunui Beach, Raglan and Narrabeen Beach, Sydney Australia. The TGA cable is made from two fibre pairs and it has a current design capacity of 20 Tbit/s. TGA is owned by Spark NZ, One NZ and Telstra.
3. The Hawaiki Transpacific Submarine Cable System (43 Tbit/s) came into service in July 2018. Hawaiki links Australia and New Zealand to the mainland United States, as well as Hawaii and American Samoa, with provision for connections to New Caledonia, Fiji and Tonga. The cable has two fibre optic pairs from the US to Australia, one pair from the US to New Zealand and one pair from New Zealand to Australia. The cable length is 15,000 km and has a capacity of 43.8 Tbit/s.

=== Historical ===
1. The Tasman-2 was built in 1992 as part of PacRimWest that covered the distance of 2,195 km with three fibre pairs, and with landing points in Sydney and Auckland. It had a capacity 1.2 Gbit/s.
2. The company Pacific Fibre proposed another international cable between New Zealand and the United States, with claims in 2011 by one of the proponents Sam Morgan that competition would cut international capacity costs, and result in more generous internet data caps. On 1 August 2012, Pacific Fibre announced they were unable to secure sufficient investment and the planned cable was discontinued. "I think it's tragic news for the New Zealand market", said Telecommunications Users Association CEO Paul Brislen. "We've spent millions of shareholder funds trying to get this done and despite getting some good investor support we have not been able to find the level of investment required in New Zealand initially and more broadly offshore", said Pacific Fibre chairman Sam Morgan. Pacific Fibre will subsequently cease operations.

== Internet exchange points ==
CityLink operates ExchangeNET, a network of neutral Internet exchange points throughout the country.

== Censorship ==
The Department of Internal Affairs runs a voluntary internet censorship scheme. Both major ISPs Spark and One NZ are members of the scheme.

== See also ==
- .nz
- Ultra-Fast Broadband (New Zealand)
- Information technology industry in New Zealand
- New Zealand Internet Blackout
- New Zealand Network Operators Group
- Telecommunications in New Zealand
- Pirate Party of New Zealand
