= Geo-blocking =

Internet censorship based upon geographical location

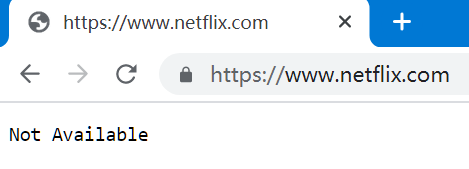
Netflix does not currently offer its streaming service in China due to a challenging regulatory environment.

Geo-blocking, geoblocking or geolocking is technology that restricts access to Internet content based upon the user's geographical location. In a geo-blocking scheme, the user's location is determined using Internet geolocation techniques, such as checking the user's IP address against a blacklist or whitelist, GPS queries in the case of a mobile device, accounts, and measuring the end-to-end delay of a network connection to estimate the physical location of the user. The result of this check is used to determine whether the system will approve or deny access to the website or to particular content. The geolocation may also be used to modify the content provided: for example, the currency in which goods are quoted, the price or the range of goods that are available.

The term is most commonly associated with its use to restrict access to premium multimedia content on the Internet, such as films and television shows, primarily for copyright and licensing reasons. There are other uses for geo-blocking, such as blocking malicious traffic or to enforce price discrimination, location-aware authentication, fraud prevention, and online gambling (where gambling laws vary by region). Websites also use geo-blocking to comply with sanctions rules and regulations.

== Justification ==
The ownership of exclusive territorial rights to audiovisual works may differ between regions, requiring the providers of the content to disallow access for users outside of their designated region; for example, although an online service, HBO Now is only available to residents of the United States, and cannot be offered in other countries because its parent network HBO had already licensed exclusive rights to its programming to different broadcasters (such as in Canada, where HBO licensed its back-catalogue to Bell Media), who may offer their own, similar service specific to their own region and business model (such as Crave). For similar reasons, the library of content available on subscription video on demand services such as Netflix may also vary between regions, or the service may not even be available in the user's country at all.

Geo-blocking can be used for other purposes as well. Price discrimination by online stores can be enforced by geo-blocking, forcing users to buy products online from a foreign version of a site where prices may be unnecessarily higher than those of their domestic version (although the inverse is often the case). The "Australia Tax" has been cited as an example of this phenomenon, which has led to governmental pressure to restrict how geo-blocking can be used in this manner in the country.

Other noted uses include blocking access from countries that a particular website is not relevant to (especially if the majority of traffic from that country is malicious), and voluntarily blocking access to content or services that are illegal under local laws. This can include online gambling, and various international websites blocking access to users within the European Economic Area due to concerns of liability under the General Data Protection Regulation (GDPR).

== Circumvention ==
Geo-blocking can be circumvented. When IP address-based geo-blocking is employed, virtual private network (VPN) and anonymizer services can be used to evade geo-blocks. A user can, for example, access a website using a U.S. IP address in order to access content or services that are not available from outside the country. Hulu, Netflix, Amazon and BBC iPlayer are among the foreign video services widely used through these means by foreign users. Its popularity among VPN users in the country prompted Netflix to officially establish an Australian version of its service in 2014. In response to complaints over the quality of domestic coverage by NBC, along with a requirement for viewers be a subscriber to a participating pay television provider in order to access the online content, a large number of American viewers used VPN services to stream foreign online coverage of the 2012 Summer Olympics and 2014 Winter Olympics from British and Canadian broadcasters. Unlike NBC's coverage, this foreign coverage only used a geo-block and did not require a TV subscription.

In 2009, Venezuela subsidized the launch of the communications satellite Venesat-1, in part to amplify Telesur's programming by enabling it to avoid geo-blocking efforts by DirectTV, an American company.

In 2013, the New Zealand internet service provider Slingshot introduced a similar feature known as "global mode"; initially intended for travellers to enable access to local websites blocked in New Zealand, the service was re-launched in July 2014 as a feature to all Slingshot subscribers. The consumer-focused re-launch focused on its ability to provide access to U.S. online video services. Unlike manually-configured VPN services, Global Mode was implemented passively at the ISP level and was automatically activated based on a whitelist, without any further user intervention.

== Legality of circumvention for online video ==
The legality of circumventing geo-blocking to access foreign video services under local copyright laws is unclear and varies by country. Members of the entertainment industry (including broadcasters and studios) have contended that the use of VPNs and similar services to evade geo-blocking by online video services is a violation of copyright laws, as the foreign service does not hold the rights to make its content available in the user's country—thus infringing and undermining the rights held by a local rights holder. Accessing online video services from outside the country in which they operate is typically considered a violation of their respective terms of use; some services have implemented measures to block VPN users, despite there being legitimate uses for such proxy services, under the assumption that they are using them to evade geographic filtering.

Leaked e-mails from the 2014 Sony Pictures hack revealed statements by Keith LeGoy, Sony Pictures Television's president of international distribution, describing the international usage of Netflix over VPN services as being "semi-sanctioned" piracy that helped to illicitly increase its market share, and criticizing the company for not taking further steps to prevent usage of the service outside of regions where they have licenses to their content, such as detecting ineligible users via their payment method. On 14 January 2016, Netflix announced its intent to strengthen measures to prevent subscribers from accessing regional versions of the service that they are not authorized to use.

=== Australia ===
In Australia, a policy FAQ published by then Minister for Communications Malcolm Turnbull, states that users violating an "international commercial arrangement to protect copyright in different countries or regions" is not illegal under copyright law of Australia. However, an amendment to Australian copyright law allows courts to order the blocking of websites that primarily engage in "facilitating" copyright infringement—a definition which could include VPN services that market themselves specifically for the purpose of evading geo-blocking. Prior to the passing of this amendment in June 2015, Turnbull acknowledged that VPN services have "a wide range of legitimate uses, not least of which is the preservation of privacy—something which every citizen is entitled to secure for themselves—and [VPN providers] have no oversight, control or influence over their customers' activities."

=== European Union ===
On 6 May 2015, the European Union announced the adoption of its "Digital Single Market" strategy, which would, among other changes, aim to end the use of "unjustified" geo-blocking between EU countries, arguing that "too many Europeans cannot use online services that are available in other EU countries, often without any justification; or they are re-routed to a local store with different prices. Such discrimination cannot exist in a Single Market." However, proposals issued by the European Commission on 25 May 2016 excluded the territorial licensing of copyrighted audiovisual works from this strategy.

On 1 April 2018, new digital media portability rules took effect, which requires paid digital media services to offer "roaming" within the EU. This means that, for example, a subscriber to Netflix in one EU country must still be able to access their home country's version of the service when travelling into other EU countries.

The European Union has approved the Regulation on Measures to Combat Unjustified Geoblocking and Other Forms of Discrimination Based on Citizenship, Place of Residence or Location of a Person in the Internal Market, which entered into force on 3 December 2018.

The geo-blocking regulation aims to provide more options for consumers and businesses in the EU internal market. It addresses the problem that (potential) customers cannot buy goods and services from sellers located in another Member State for reasons related to their citizenship, place of residence or location, and therefore discriminate against them when they try to get access to the best offers, prices or terms of sale compared to the nationals or residents of the member state of the sellers.

The new rules only apply if the other party is a consumer or a company that purchases services or products exclusively for end use (B2C, B2B). Geo-blocking regulation does not apply if products are sold to business customers for commercial purposes. The Geoblocking Ordinance does not completely prohibit geoblocking and geo-discrimination: it only prohibits certain forms.

Geo-blocking regulations prohibit geo-blocking and geo-discrimination in three situations:

1. It is not permitted to deny website visitors access to it or automatically redirect them to another website depending on their location. Redirection is only allowed with the consent of the visitor. Similar rules apply to apps as well: they must be able to download and use them throughout the EU.
2. The rules apply to the means of payment accepted on the site. A payment method cannot be refused because the customer or his / or her bank is located in another EU Member State or because the means of payment was issued in another EU Member State. Other payment terms and higher transaction costs are also prohibited.
3. In certain situations, it is no longer allowed to apply other general conditions to foreign customers:
  1. when providing digital services such as cloud services and web hosting;
  2. when providing services in a physical location, such as renting cars or selling tickets for an event;
  3. When selling goods and offering, either deliver them to a specific area or collect them in a specific place (for example, a store).

The prohibition of direct or indirect discrimination on the basis of citizenship is a fundamental principle of EU law. In situations not covered by this Regulation, Article 20 (2) of the Services Directive (2006/123 / EC) may apply. According to this provision, sellers can only apply a difference of treatment based on nationality or place of residence if this is justified by objective criteria. In some cases, industry-specific legislation (such as transport or health) may also apply that addresses this issue. In addition, the Regulation does not affect the TFEU rules, including the non-discrimination rules.

=== New Zealand ===
In April 2015, a group of media companies in New Zealand, including MediaWorks, Spark, Sky Network Television, and TVNZ, jointly sent cease and desist notices to several ISPs offering VPN services for the purpose of evading geo-blocking, demanding that they pledge to discontinue the operation of these services by 15 April 2015, and to inform their customers that such services are "unlawful". The companies accused the ISPs of facilitating copyright infringement by violating their exclusive territorial rights to content in the country, and misrepresenting the alleged legality of the services in promotional material. In particular, Spark argued that the use of VPNs to access foreign video on demand services was cannibalizing its own domestic service Lightbox. At least two smaller providers (Lightwire Limited and Unlimited Internet) announced that they would pull their VPN services in response to the legal concerns. However, CallPlus, the parent company of Slingshot and Orcon, objected to the claims, arguing that the Global Mode service was "completely legal", and accused the broadcasters of displaying protectionism. Later that month, it was reported that the broadcasters planned to go forward with legal action against CallPlus.

On 24 June 2015, it was announced that the media companies reached an out-of-court settlement, in which ByPass Network Services, who operates the service, would discontinue it effective 1 September 2015.

== Technical implementation and challenges ==
Geo-blocking is commonly implemented by identifying a user's geographic location primarily through their IP address, which is mapped to a country or region using GeoIP databases. This allows servers or network-level systems to approve or deny access to online content based on geographic policies. Two main approaches exist: network-level blocking, where IP packets are filtered or blocked, and application-level blocking, where access is denied after detecting the user's location. Content delivery networks (CDNs) often integrate geo-blocking controls to enforce regional restrictions efficiently. However, technical challenges include the inherent inaccuracy of IP-to-location mapping, the use of VPNs or proxy services to circumvent restrictions, and maintaining up-to-date IP location databases. Dynamic geo-blocking systems may also incorporate real-time threat intelligence or user behavior analysis to adapt controls. Balancing accuracy with minimizing legitimate access issues remains a central concern for deployment.

== See also ==
- Regional lockout
- IP address blocking
- Internet censorship
- Blackout (broadcasting)
- Blocking of YouTube videos in Germany
- HTTP 451
