= NetSmart =

NetSmart Ltd.
- Company type: Private company
- Industry: Internet service provider
- Founded: 1988; 38 years ago
- Headquarters: Tauranga, Bay of Plenty, New Zealand
- Products: Fibre & Wireless Broadband, Telephony services, Hosting, Data center, Cloud computing, Hotspots
- Website: www.netsmart.co.nz

NetSmart Limited was a telecommunication service provider based in Tauranga, Bay of Plenty region of New Zealand.

== Company milestones ==
- 1998 - NetSmart is born;
- 1999 - NetSmart starts web hosting;
- 2002 - NetSmart starts building a broadband wireless network in the Bay of Plenty;
- 2002 - NetSmart connects to the Auckland Peering Exchange;
- 2004 - NetSmart moves to new custom built data centre in Regency House, Tauranga;
- 2005 - Broadband coverage is now extended from Waihi through to Whakatāne;
- 2007 - NetSmart builds DMR backhaul from Auckland (Sky Tower) to Tauranga, scalable to Gigabit Ethernet;
- 2008 - NetSmart adds fibre based backup to Auckland DMR link;
- 2009 - NetSmart starts trials of licensed WiMAX and starts fitout of a new data centre in Tauranga;
- 2010 - NetSmart launches business licensed WiMAX service in Matamata-Piako, Hauraki, Western Bay and Tauranga Districts;
- 2011 - NetSmart launches high speed residential licensed WiMAX broadband and phone service;
- 2012 - NetSmart increases its licensed WiMAX coverage to Hamilton and Cambridge, Waikato;
- 2012 - NetSmart increases its licensed WiMAX coverage to Bombay region, Auckland;
- 2013 - NetSmart acquired Skynet - Waikato region based wireless ISP;
- 2014 - NetSmart extends its after hour and weekend customer support;
- 2015 - NetSmart launched its Ultrafast Wireless product;
- 2015 - NetSmart started a sister company in Nairobi, Kenya;
- 2016 - NetSmart internet branch is acquired by Lightwire Limited existing staff of the business continues operation under the name "Eco Datacenter";
