= McAuley High School, Auckland =

McAuley High School

Location
- 26 High Street; Ōtāhuhu; Auckland; New Zealand; 36.944168°S 174.847959°E

Information
- Type: State, Girls, Secondary (Year 9–13)
- Motto: Latin: Domine in te speravi
- Established: 1962; 64 years ago
- Ministry of Education Institution no.: 90
- Principal: Jan Waelen
- Enrolment: 770 (July 2026)
- Socio-economic decile: 1B
- Website: mcauleyhigh.school.nz

McAuley High School is a Catholic girls' secondary school in Ōtāhuhu, New Zealand. The school was founded by the Sisters of Mercy in 1962 and continues to be owned by the order. The college is a State-integrated school.

Students at the school achieve highly compared to the national average and to students at schools with a similar decile rating. Attendance figures are very high compared to most low decile schools. Regular attendance at school is a constant message that is backed up by the local catholic church which stands at over 90%.

In 2016 the school was awarded with both Excellence in Engaging and Education Supreme Awards by the Prime Minister of New Zealand.

== Enrolment ==
As of July 2026, McAuley High School has a roll of 770 students, of which 25 (3.2%) identify as Māori.

As of 2026, the school has an Equity Index of 483, placing it amongst schools whose students have above average socioeconomic barriers to achievement (roughly equivalent to decile 4 under the former socio-economic decile system).

== Notable alumnae ==
- Annette Presley – businessperson and founder of Slingshot
- Anne Frances Audain née Garrett MBE – Competed in three Olympic Games and four Commonwealth Games. Gold Medalist at Brisbane Commonwealth Games.
- Josephine Bartley – first Pacific woman to be elected to Auckland Council governing body.
