= Citylink =

Citylink, Citilink or City Link may refer to:

== Transport ==
- CityLink, a system of tollways, tunnels and bridges in Melbourne, Australia
- Maryland Transit Administration, a system of high-frequency bus routes serving Baltimore, Maryland U.S.
- City Link (company), previously Initial City Link, a former courier company in the United Kingdom
- Central Citylink, a defunct train service brand used by Central Trains in England
- Finney County Transit, whose fixed-route buses operate under City Link branding
- Greater Peoria Mass Transit District also goes by CityLink
- Stadler Citylink, a series of tram-trains

=== Bus & coach services ===
- Scottish Citylink, intercity coach operator in Scotland
- Irish Citylink, intercity coach operator in the Republic of Ireland
- Citylink Edmond, a bus system in Edmond, Oklahoma
- Citylink (Idaho), a bus system in Coeur d'Alene, Idaho
- Greater Peoria Mass Transit District, an Illinois bus system that uses the name CityLink
- CityLink, a bus route operated by Bluestar (bus company) in southern England
- Citylink Coach Services, a bus company in the Philippines
- Fort Wayne Citilink, Indiana

=== Airlines ===
- Citylink (Ghana), an airline in Ghana
- Alberta Citylink, an airline in Alberta, Canada
- Citilink Airlines, an airline in Indonesia

== Telecommunications ==
- Citylink, a consortium to finance the Connect Project radio system on the London Underground
- CityLink Limited, a broadband company in New Zealand

== Buildings ==
- CityLink Mall, a shopping mall in Singapore
- Citylink Plaza, an office building in Hong Kong
- Citylink (Taiwanese shopping malls), several shopping malls in Taiwan
