= JANOG =

JANOG is the Internet network operators' group for the Japanese Internet service provider (ISP) community. It was originally established in 1997.

JANOG holds regular meetings for the ISP community, with thousands of attendees. Although JANOG has no formal budget of its own, it draws on the resources of its member companies to do so.
