= Internet network operators' group =

Forum for technical discussion

Internet network operators' groups (NOGs) are informal, country-based, or regional groups that exist to provide forums for Internet network operators to discuss matters of mutual interest, usually through a combination of mailing lists and annual conferences. Although these groups have no formal power, their members are typically influential members of the Internet service provider (ISP), Internet exchange point (IXP), regional Internet registry (RIR), operational security community, Internet Protocol version 6 (IPv6) operations, Domain Name System (DNS) and root zone operations, and other network operations communities, and discussions within these groups are often influential in the overall process of ensuring the Internet remains operational, robust, secure, and stable. They also allow networking professionals and other members of the research and technical communities to update each other on their work, share news and updates, exchange best practices, discuss new technologies or protocols, teach and learn from each other, network with other members of the community, and discuss current network- and Internet-related issues and challenges.

== List of Internet network operators' groups ==
=== Global Scope (Note: The 'Global Scope' section lists Orgs which support NOGs (Network Operators' Groups) & tech communities around the world; while amplifying the voice of Network Operators, identifying and fixing common operational problems.) ===
- GNA – Global NOG Alliance

=== Africa ===
==== African Regional NOGs ====
- AfNOG – Africa Network Operators' Group

===== Central African NOGs =====
- -

====== Central African Country NOGs ======
- AONOG – Angola Network Operators' Group
- cmNOG – Cameroonian Network Operators' Group (Note: cmNOG's Mailing List — https://lists.cmnog.cm/mailman/listinfo/cmnog/) (Cameroon)
- CGNOG – Congo Network Operators' Group (Republic of the Congo)

===== Eastern African NOGs =====
- -

====== Eastern African Country NOGs ======
- RWNOG – Rwanda Network Operators' Group
- SomNOG - Somalia Network Operators' Group
- tzNOG – Tanzania Network Operators' Group
- ugNOG - Uganda Network Operators' Group
- ZIMNOG – Zimbabwe Network Operators' Group

===== Northern African NOGs =====
- -

====== Northern African Country NOGs ======
- SdNOG – Sudan Network Operators' Group

===== Southern African NOGs =====
- SAFNOG – Southern African Network Operators' Group

====== Southern African Country NOGs ======
- KZNNOG – Kwazulu Natal Network Operators' Group (South Africa)

===== Western African NOGs =====
- -

====== Western African Country NOGs ======
- GhNOG – Ghana Network Operators' Group
- MaliNOG – Malian Network Operators' Group (Note: MaliNOG's Mailing List — https://malinog.ml/mailman/listinfo/list_malinog.ml) (Mali)
- ngNOG – Nigerian Network Operators' Group (Nigeria)
- SnNOG - Senegal Network Operations Group

===== Additional African technical networking and peering communities =====
- AIS (African Internet Summit) & AFRINIC Regional Meetings – AFRINIC Service Region Meetings
- AFRINIC – African Network Information Centre
- Af-IX – African Community for IXPs

=== The Americas ===
==== Latin America and the Caribbean ====
- CaribNOG – Caribbean Network Operators' Group
- LAC-IX – Latin America & Caribbean Community for IXPs
- LACNOG – Latin American & Caribbean Region Network Operators' Group
- NOG Ecuador – Ecuador Network Operators' Group
- ArNOG – Argentina Network Operators' Group
- NOG Chile – Chile Network Operators' Group
- NOG Bolivia – Bolivia Network Operators' Group
- BPF – Brasil Peering Forum (Brazil)
- NOG Colombia – Colombia Network Operators' Group

==== Northern America ====
- NANOG – North American Network Operators' Group
- ABQNOG – Albuquerque Network Operators' Group (United States)
- CHI-NOG – Chicago Network Operators' Group (United States)
- NYNOG – New York Network Operators' Group (United States)
- MBNOG – Manitoba Network Operators' Group (Canada)
- MTLNOG – Montreal Network Operators' Group (Canada)

=== Asia and Oceania ===
==== Asia-Pacific ====
===== Regional NOGs =====
- APNOG – Asia Pacific Network Operators Group
- PacNOG – The Pacific Network Operators' Group
- SANOG – South Asia Network Operators' Group

===== Specific NOGs =====
- AFNOG - Afghanistan Network Operators Group
- AusNOG – Australia Network Operators' Group
- BdNOG – Bangladesh Network Operators' Group
- btNOG – Bhutan Network Operators' Group
- CNNOG – China Network Operators' Group
- HKNOG – Hong Kong Network Operators' Group
- IDNOG – Indonesia Network Operators' Group
- INNOG – India Network Operators' Group
- JANOG – Japan Network Operators' Group
- KHNOG - Cambodia Network Operators' Group
- KRNOG - South Korea Network Operators' Group
- LANOG - Lao Network Operators' Group (Laos)
- LKNOG - Lanka Network Operators' Group (Sri Lanka)
- MyNOG – Malaysia Network Operators' Group
- mmNOG – Myanmar Network Operators' Group
- mnNOG – Mongolian Network Operators' Group (Mongolia)
- npNOG – Nepal Network Operators' Group
- NZNOG – New Zealand Network Operators' Group
- PANOG – Pakistan Network Operators' Group
- PhNOG – Philippines Network Operators' Group
- PNGNOG - Papua New Guinea Network Operators' Group
- SGNOG – Singapore Network Operators' Group
- ThaiNOG – Thailand Network Operators' Group
- TLNOG - Timor-Leste Network Operator Group
- TWNOG – Taiwan Network Operators' Group
- VNIX-NOG – Vietnam Network Operators' Group

===== Additional Asia-Pacific technical networking and peering communities =====
- APIX – The Asian Community for Internet Exchange Points
- APOPS – The Asia Pacific Operators Forum
- APRICOT – The Asia Pacific Regional Internet Conference on Operational Technologies
- APIAP – The Asia Pacific Internet Association
- APIPv6TF – The Asia Pacific IPv6 Task Force

==== Middle East ====
- MENOG – Middle East Network Operators' Group
- IRNOG – Iranian Internet Network Operators' Group - (گروه گردانندگان شبکه اینترنت ایران - ایرناگ) (Iran)
- TRNOG – Turkish Network Operators' Group (Türk Network Operatörleri Grubu) (Turkey)

=== Europe ===
- CSNOG – Czech and Slovak Network Operators Group (Czech Republic)
- CEE Peering Days – Central and Eastern Europe (CEE) Peering Days
- ENOG – Eurasia Network Operators' Group (Russian Federation, CIS, and Eastern Europe) (Russia) — suspended by RIPE community
- European Internet Exchange Association – Euro-IX (the European community for IXPs)
- NORDNOG – Nordic Network Operators' Group (Note: inactive as of 8 February 2016)
- RIPE – Réseaux IP Européens Network
- SEE – South East Europe / RIPE NCC regional meeting
- ALNOG – Albanian Network Operators' Group (Albania)
- ATNOG – Austrian Network Operators' Group (Austria)
- BalticNOG – Baltic States Network Operators' Group (Lithuania) (Latvia) (Estonia)
- BHNOG – Bosnia and Herzegovina Network Operators' Group
- BENOG – Belgium Network Operators' Group
- NOG.BG – Bulgarian Network Operations' Group (Bulgaria)
- DKNOG – Danish Network Operators' Group (Denmark)
- ESNOG – Spanish Network Operators' Group (Spain)
- nog.fi – Network Operators' Group of Finland (Note: The NOG's activities, in Finland were previously, unofficially, organised by TREX Workshops; starting in 2009 until 2018. In 2019 these gatherings were renamed nog.fi meetings...)
- FRnOG – France Network Operators' Group
- DENOG – German Network Operators' Group (Germany)
- GRnOG – Greece Network Operators' Group
- HUNOG – Hungarian Network Operators' Group (Hungary)
- GTER – Spain Network Operators' Group (Grupo de Operadores de Red Españoles, ESNOG)
- ITNOG – Italian Network Operators' Group (Italy)
- iNOG – Ireland Network Operators' Group (Republic of Ireland)
- LINX (Note: The London Internet Exchange is not strictly a NOG, but this IXP also helps coordinate the UK ISP community) (United Kingdom)
- NLNOG – Netherlands Network Operators' Group
- NONOG – Norwegian Network Operators' Group (Norway)
- PLNOG – Polish Network Operators' Group (Poland)
- PTNOG – Portuguese Network Operators' Group (Portugal)
- RSNOG – Republic of Serbia Network Operators' Group
- RONOG – Romania Network Operators' Group
- SINOG – Slovenia Network Operators' Group
- SOF – Swedish Operators' Forum (Sweden)
- SwiNOG – Swiss Network Operators' Group (Switzerland)
- HRNOG – Croatian Network Operators' Group (Note: HRNOG's Mailing List — https://nog.hr/cgi-bin/mailman/listinfo/hrnog-members) (Croatia)
- NOGUA – Network Operators Group of Ukraine
- UKNOF – United Kingdom Network Operators' Forum

== Additional links ==
- The Asia-Pacific Network Information Centre's (APNIC) list of NOGs in the Asia-Pacific region
- Bugest NOG list
- The Internet Society's (ISOC) development activities
- List of Internet exchange points
- The Network Startup Resource Center's Network Education and Training Calendar of Events, listing NOGs and their meeting dates
- NOG meeting dates and related Internet events
- RIPE NCC's NOG resource page
- Senki NOG list

== See also ==
- Regional Internet registry
- Internet exchange point
