= NZNOG =

NZNOG is the New Zealand Network Operators' Group. Originally formed as a mailing list hosted by the University of Waikato and intended to provide a means of easy collaboration between Internet service provider network operations staff, its role has expanded to that of an online community of network operators, predominantly in the ISP space, allowing for the discussion of topics of a technical and operational nature. NZNOG has existed as a legal entity in the form of the NZNOG Trust since 2009.

NZNOG runs a yearly conference, during which workshops, tutorials and presentations on various topics of interest to the network operations community in New Zealand. It also provides an excellent opportunity to network with others in the industry - there is usually at least one evening which provides a catered dinner, as well as opportunity for BoF's.

The ongoing success of the NZNOG Conference owes much to the enthusiastic support of its participants, being key staff of various New Zealand Internet service providers, IT companies and tertiary education institutions.

As an example of the role NZNOG has had in the Internet world in New Zealand, it played a major part in the formation of the first of the vendor-neutral Peering Exchanges in New Zealand - such as the Wellington Internet Exchange (WIX) and the Auckland Peering Exchange (APE).

The NZNOG mailing list remains a fairly influential aspect of the New Zealand Internet service provider community, and a useful communications channel for the participants.

== Conferences ==
- 2002 - Auckland at Airport Sheraton - Joint Conference with UniforumNZ
- 2003 - Auckland at Waipuna Lodge - Joint Conference with UniforumNZ
- 2004 - Hamilton at University of Waikato
- 2005 - Hamilton at University of Waikato
- 2006 - Wellington at Victoria University of Wellington
- 2007 - Palmerston North at Massey University. Hosted by InspireNet
- 2008 - Dunedin at Otago Museum. Hosted by WIC
- 2009 - Auckland at Mount Richmond Hotel and Conference Centre. Hosted by FX Networks
- 2010 - Hamilton at University of Waikato. Hosted by WAND and Rurallink
- 2011 - Wellington at InterContinental Hotel. Hosted by Vodafone
- 2012 - Christchurch at Copthorne Commodore Hotel.
- 2013 - Wellington at Mercure Hotel.
- 2014 - Nelson at Rutherford Hotel.
- 2015 - Rotorua at Distinction Hotel.
- 2016 - No Conference due to APRICOT (conference) in Auckland
- 2017 - Tauranga at Trinity Wharf
- 2018 - Queenstown at Rydges Hotel
- 2019 - Napier Conference Centre, January 31 - February 1
- 2020 - Christchurch at Rydges Latimer, January 30-31
- 2021 - No Conference due to the COVID-19 pandemic
- 2022 - Wellington at InterContinental Hotel. Conference postponed to May 19-20 due to restrictions under the COVID-19 Protection Framework.
- 2023 - Rotorua at the Rydges Hotel, March 23-24
- 2024 - Nelson at the Rutherford Hotel, April 11-12
- 2025 - Napier at the Napier War Memorial Centre, April 10-11
- 2026 - Christchurch at Te Pae Christchurch Convention Centre, March 26-27

== See also ==
- Internet network operators' group

== External links & References ==
- NZNOG Conference & Official website
- NZNOG Mailing List
- Announcement regarding the formation of the NZNOG Trust
- NZ Societies and Trusts record for NZNOG Trust
- NZ Internet Exchange website
