= Auckland Peering Exchange =

Coordinates: 36.8484°S 174.7621°E

- Full name: Auckland Peering Exchange
- Abbreviation: APE
- Founded: 1999
- Location: New Zealand
- Website: Official website

The Auckland Peering Exchange (APE) is an Ethernet-based neutral peering point running over the CityLink metropolitan network in Auckland, New Zealand. It is part of CityLink's ExchangeNET group of peering exchanges.

The Auckland Peering Exchange was established to allow entities connected to the APE switches in Auckland to send traffic directly to and from each other rather than via their Internet service provider. This activity is known as peering. This provides improvements in speed as traffic travels directly between the parties and reduces load on the network by reducing the need for traffic to be duplicated through one or more intermediate ISP routers. In some cases this also avoids traffic being routed "out of town", or incurring ISP's traffic charges.

The Auckland Peering Exchange provides two route servers which contain routing details for each of the participants. This simplifies peering enormously for most exchange users.

APE grew out of discussions on the NZNOG mailing list. The Auckland Sky Tower was agreed to be a sensible meeting place, since it was already equipped as a telehousing facility, it is a good high-point for Wireless access, and it is a neutral point to meet.

Initially, participant equipment and the CityLink switches were mainly located on the 48th floor of the Sky Tower. This deck is air-conditioned and enclosed with low-attenuation glass, allowing point-to-point radio shots back to base without needing weatherproofing and resource consent for external antennas. CityLink have also extended APE's L2 LAN outside of the Sky Tower so it is possible to connect to APE at a number of locations in the Auckland CBD without having a circuit into the Sky Tower.

== See also ==
- List of Internet exchange points
