= Swiss Network Operators Group =

Community of Swiss Internet network operators

- Abbreviation: SwiNOG
- Formation: 24 February 2000; 26 years ago (community); 27 July 2009 (association)
- Type: Community and voluntary association (Verein)
- Headquarters: Zürich, Switzerland
- Region served: Switzerland
- Website: swinog.ch

The Swiss Network Operators Group (SwiNOG) is an informal community of engineers and operators who work on the design and operation of the Internet in Switzerland. It is the Swiss counterpart of regional network operators' groups such as NANOG in North America. The community was established in February 2000, held its first meeting in October 2000 and has met roughly twice a year since.

== History ==
SwiNOG was founded as a community on 24 February 2000; its first meeting took place in Bern on 18 October 2000. In 2004 the Swiss IT weekly Netzwoche described the group as the "quality guardian" of the Swiss Internet, whose mailing list allowed technicians of competing Internet service providers to resolve operational issues directly, bypassing slower official channels.

In 2008, the group was presented at RIPE 56 as an example of a regional network operators' group, with two yearly meetings in Bern attended by more than 100 participants.

On 27 July 2009 the SwiNOG Organisation was founded as a non-profit association (Verein) under Articles 60 ff. of the Swiss Civil Code. It provides the legal and organisational basis for the community: it holds the domain, website and mailing lists, handles sponsorship and finances, and organises the meetings. Membership of the association is not required to take part in the community.

The 40th meeting in June 2025 marked the group's 25th anniversary.

== Activities ==
=== Mailing list ===
The central instrument of the group is the swinog mailing list, used for operational discussions such as outages, peering and MTU issues. It is hosted on GNU Mailman with a public archive. Smaller lists exist for specific topics, including an anti-spam working group and job postings. The group also operates DNS-based blocklists (SwiNOG DNSRBL and URIBL).

=== Meetings ===
SwiNOG meetings are held about twice a year. They consist of a single track of technical presentations followed by a social event; attendance is open to everyone and the meetings are funded by sponsors. Topics have ranged from out-of-band management and SDN/NFV to RPKI, BGP data collection and optical transceivers. Presentations are selected through a public call for papers, and slides of every meeting since 2000 and video recordings since 2014 are published in the group's archive.

From 2004 to 2019 the meetings were held in Bern, first at the Altes Tramdepot and from 2010 on the Gurten. The 42nd meeting, in October 2026, is the first two-day meeting and the first held outside Bern since 2001, at the Enter Technikwelt in Derendingen near Solothurn.

=== Beer Events ===
In addition to the meetings, members of the community organised informal monthly SwiNOG Beer Events in Zürich, a social gathering for the exchange of information between network operators. The Zürich Beer Events were founded by Viktor Steinmann and Steven Glogger and organised for many years by Glogger, who handed them over at the end of 2015; from 2016 they were continued by Emanuel Kleindienst and revived in 2018 by Steinmann. More than 160 such events were held between the 2000s and the late 2010s; they are no longer held on a regular basis.

== List of meetings ==
All meetings, with dates and venues, are documented in the SwiNOG archive.

Meeting	Date	Location
SwiNOG #42	20–21 October 2026	Derendingen, Enter Technikwelt Solothurn
SwiNOG #41	28 April 2026	Bern, Gurten
SwiNOG #40	24 June 2025	Bern, Gurten
SwiNOG #39	25 September 2024	Bern, Gurten
SwiNOG #38	21 June 2023	Bern, Gurten
SwiNOG #37	2 December 2021	Bern, Gurten
SwiNOG #36	14 November 2019	Bern, Gurten
SwiNOG #35	8 May 2019	Bern, Gurten
SwiNOG #34	30 October 2018	Bern, Gurten
SwiNOG #33	24 May 2018	Bern, Gurten
SwiNOG #32	9 November 2017	Bern, Gurten
SwiNOG #31	30 May 2017	Bern, Gurten
SwiNOG #30	4 November 2016	Bern, Gurten
SwiNOG #29	5 November 2015	Bern, Gurten
SwiNOG #28	6 May 2015	Bern, Gurten
SwiNOG #27	22 October 2014	Bern, Gurten
SwiNOG #26	26 May 2013	Bern, Gurten
SwiNOG #25	7 November 2012	Bern, Gurten
SwiNOG #24	10 May 2012	Bern, Gurten
SwiNOG #23	10 November 2011	Bern, Gurten
SwiNOG #22	9 May 2011	Bern, Gurten
SwiNOG #21	11 November 2010	Bern, Gurten
SwiNOG #20	1 June 2010	Bern, Gurten
SwiNOG #19	29 September 2009	Bern, Altes Tramdepot
SwiNOG #18	2 April 2009	Bern, Altes Tramdepot
SwiNOG #17	22 October 2008	Bern, Altes Tramdepot
SwiNOG #16	14 May 2008	Bern, Altes Tramdepot
SwiNOG #15	4 December 2007	Bern, Altes Tramdepot
SwiNOG #14	30 May 2007	Bern, Altes Tramdepot
SwiNOG #13	1 November 2006	Bern, Altes Tramdepot
SwiNOG #12	4 May 2006	Bern, Altes Tramdepot
SwiNOG #11	20 October 2005	Bern, Altes Tramdepot
SwiNOG #10	20 April 2005	Bern, Altes Tramdepot
SwiNOG #9	29 September 2004	Bern, Altes Tramdepot
SwiNOG #8	24 March 2004	Bern, Altes Tramdepot
SwiNOG #7	22 October 2003	Bern
SwiNOG #6	10 April 2003	Bern
SwiNOG #5	25 September 2002	Bern
SwiNOG #4	17 April 2002	Bern
SwiNOG #3	19 September 2001	Bern
SwiNOG #2	21 March 2001	Zürich
SwiNOG #1	18 October 2000	Bern

== See also ==
- North American Network Operators' Group
- SwissIX
- Internet in Switzerland
