= Lightwire Limited =

Internet service provider (ISP) based in Hamilton, New Zealand

- Trade name: Lightwire
- Company type: Private company
- Industry: Telecommunications
- Founded: 2006
- Founder: Murray William Pearson
- Headquarters: Hamilton, New Zealand
- Area served: New Zealand; Australia
- Products: Residential and business telecommunication solutions Rural Fixed Wireless; Fibre broadband VoIP; 3CX; Teams Phone; WAN
- Website: www.lightwire.co

Lightwire (formerly Rural Link Limited) is an Internet service provider (ISP) based in Hamilton, New Zealand. Lightwire was born out of a University of Waikato project in 2006.

In May 2016, Lightwire purchased the broadband arm of NetSmart Ltd thus extending their service coverage into the Bay of Plenty.

== See also ==
- Internet in New Zealand
