= 2degrees =

Telecommunications company in New Zealand

Two Degrees New Zealand Limited
- Type: Subsidiary
- Industry: Telecommunications, mobile phone, Internet
- Founded: 2001; 25 years ago
- Headquarters: Auckland, New Zealand
- Key people: Tex Edwards (founder); Mark Callander (CEO, 2022–Present); Mark Aue (CEO, 2019–2022); Stewart Sherriff (CEO, 2013–2019); Eric Hertz (CEO, 2009–2013); Mike Reynolds (CEO, 2009)
- Products: Backhaul; Broadband; Cloud computing; Data centre; Mobile networks; Retail; Voice
- Owner: 2degrees (NZ) Holdings Pty Limited
- Subsidiaries: 2Talk; Flip; Orcon; Slingshot
- Website: www.2degrees.nz

Two Degrees New Zealand Limited, trading as 2degrees, is a New Zealand full service telecommunications provider. It is the third-largest mobile network operator in New Zealand, with 1.6 million subscribers as of May 2021. Since launching its mobile network, 2degrees broke up the New Zealand mobile duopoly, halving the price of prepay overnight.

It has spent over NZ$550 million building its mobile network, which as of 2016 covers Ashburton, Auckland, Christchurch, Dunedin, Hamilton, Hastings, Invercargill, Levin, Napier, Nelson, New Plymouth, Oamaru, Palmerston North, Queenstown, Rotorua, Taupō, Tauranga, Timaru, Wanganui, Wellington and Whangārei. In areas without 2degrees coverage, handsets connect to One NZ's UMTS and LTE network using MoRAN, using 2degrees' spectrum.

2degrees is owned by 2degrees (NZ) Holdings Pty Limited, with Macquarie Asset Management and Aware Super as its ultimate shareholders. Until 24 May 2022, it was majority owned by US-based Trilogy International Partners.

In March 2015, 2degrees announced it had acquired Snap, a broadband-based ISP, and from 28 July began offering broadband and home-phone services in addition to existing mobile services.

In 2022, 2degrees merged with Vocus New Zealand – the operator of the Orcon, Slingshot and Stuff Fibre brands – following their acquisition by Macquarie Asset Management and Aware Super. The New Zealand Commerce Commission granted clearance for the merger in May 2022, allowing the combined entity to become one of the largest integrated telecommunications providers in the country.

== Naming ==
The name of the company is a play on the concept of six degrees of separation, the "two degrees" being a reference to the relatively small population of New Zealand and the idea of the closeness of New Zealand communities.

== Network ==
2degrees was formerly known as NZ Communications and previously as Econet Wireless. Planning began in 2000, but details were not revealed until 11 May 2009 and pricing was announced a day before launch. 2degrees accepted its first customers on 4 August 2009 for 2G calling and SMS only. Nearly a year later, on 3 August 2010, 3G was turned on and new data plans announced for use in areas where 2degrees has its cell towers. 2degrees launched its 4G network in 2014, and later launched its 5G network on 28 February 2022.

2degrees' network works with LTE Band 1, 3, 8 and 28 and 5G NR Band n78 mobiles. Their 3G network, which was closed down on 2 February 2026, supported handsets using the UMTS-900 and UMTS-2100 frequency bands.

2degrees has plans to launch a direct-to-standard-phone (sat2phone) network in 2026 using AST SpaceMobile satellites for 4G and 5G data services through its ground station in Marton.

== Coverage ==
2degrees had native GSM (900M/1800) with EDGE data in the main centres using Huawei kit at launch and had a roaming agreement with One NZ (then Vodafone) (GSM with GPRS only), so had nationwide coverage on launch day. 2degrees launched 3G (UMTS 900/2100) services in August 2010 in all coverage areas, including One NZ roaming locations. 2degrees launched 4G LTE (B3 1800) services in Auckland in June 2014 and expanded to its own network over the next two years. 2degrees progressively extended its own network covering most of New Zealand's population. In 2020, 2degrees ended its national roaming agreement with One NZ. It now has an infrastructure sharing agreement with One NZ on 200 remote towers (using Multi Operator Radio Access Network (MoRAN) technology). 5G services went live in Auckland, Wellington, and Christchurch in March 2022. With the launch of 5G, 2degrees is progressively replacing its Huawei equipment with new Ericsson (3G,4G and 5G) kit. 2G services were shut down in March 2018.

2degrees rollout schedule
Date	Area	Notes
From Launch	Auckland, Wellington, Christchurch and Queenstown.: Wellington included Wellington, Hutt City, Porirua and Kapiti.; Initially these areas were 2G only, then 3G a year later, then 4G as below.	
August 2010	Piha, Muriwai. Holiday beaches near Auckland.	
Mid 2011	Hamilton and Tauranga	
April 2012	Whangarei, Rotorua, Taupō, Napier, Hastings, Whanganui, Palmerston North, Levin, Nelson, Ashburton, Dunedin and Invercargill	
June 2012	Burnham	
September/October 2012	Timaru	
November 2012	Rolleston	
Early 2013	Tokoroa, Putaruru, Opotiki, Picton, Cromwell, Westport, Temuka, Bluff, Blenheim, Motueka and Nelson.	
Mid 2013	Hāwera, Wairoa, Marton, Feilding, Greymouth, Hokitika, Hanmer Springs, Wānaka, New Plymouth, Gisborne and Oamaru.	
2014	Culverden, Oxford (rural Canterbury). Featherston, Martinborough (rural Wairarapa). Inglewood, Te Awamutu, Te Aroha Kawerau, Waihi, Whangamata. Dannevirke and Woodville.	
30 June 2014	4G LTE Service in Auckland isthmus, including Auckland Airport, Mangere and Otahuhu in the south, to Devonport and Birkenhead in the north and Te Atatū in the West.	
5 September 2014	4G LTE Auckland, expansion of coverage out to Henderson, Kumeu, Albany and Torbay, in the west and north.	4G LTE Service in Wellington City: including Miramar Peninsula, Wellington Airport, Thorndon, Te Aro down to Island Bay and north along the harbour to Ngauranga. Most of the harbour water and beaches across to Eastbourne beachfront and Petone beachfront (The Esplanade).
22 September 2014	4G LTE Christchurch coverage from airport to CBD, including: Shirley, Sydenham, Wigram, Yaldhurst, Harewood, Papanui. Excluding: Hornby, Bishopdale, New Brighton and Woolston.	
26 September 2014	4G LTE Hamilton, coverage over the urban area.	
7 December 2014	4G LTE Tauranga CBD and Otumoetai. Coverage over the urban area from Mount Manganui through Papamoa beach.	
January 2015	4G LTE Lower Hutt, Petone, Stokes Valley, Wainuiomata, up to Fergusson Drive (Hutt River bridge).	4G LTE Hamilton, extended coverage: East to: Puketaha, Matangi and Tamahere. West to: Rotokauri and Burbush.
April 2015	4G LTE Levin and rural surround, Feilding to Bunnythorpe, Te Awamutu, Ashburton, Dunedin City and harbour. Late April: Hastings.	
May 2015	4G LTE Whangarei, Whangamata, Katikati, Rotorua, Gisborne, Napier (including Clive and Havelock North), Whanganui, Palmerston North, Nelson, Blenheim, Rangiora (including Kaiapoi and Pegasus), Ashburton and Queenstown.	3G UMTS in Methven, Windwhistle, Sheffield, Hinds and Rakaia.
June 2015	4G LTE Greater Tauranga.	
July 2015	3G UMTS in North Island: Kaitaia, Kerikeri, Kaikohe, Wellsford, Huntly, Otorohonga, Katikati, Maketu, Shannon, Takaka, Takapau, West Melton, Waipukurau and Waipawa. In the South Island: Waipara and Waikari.	
16 October 2015	4G LTE Paraparaumu, Kapiti.	
January 2016	4G LTE Ōtaki, Te Horo, Waikanae, Porirua, Johnsonville.	
December 2021	4G in Chatham Island, Pitt Island	
December 2021	5G in Auckland, Wellington and Christchurch	

2degrees also operated a Wi-Fi network in Wellington city. The network was on a trial with some selected members of the public (about 20,000 people).

4G LTE services are on (band 3) 1800MHz. In addition, (band 28) 700MHz is used for "long-range" 4G services and Rural Connectivity Group towers.

In December 2021, 5G towers have been registered in Auckland, Wellington and Christchurch using the n78/3500MHz band. Over the next 3 years, 2degrees expanded their 5G network to cover many main centers.

=== Network operator partnerships ===
Rural Broadband Initiative 2 (RBI 2) and Mobile Black Spots Fund (MBSF) funding from the New Zealand Government resulted in a collaboration between 2degrees, One NZ, Spark NZ and Crown Infrastructure Partners, known as the Rural Connectivity Group (RCG), with shared mobile coverage and wireless broadband using Multi Operator Radio Access Network (MoRAN) technology.

== Standards and technologies ==
Technology	Frequency	Speed
2G	GSM-900 and GSM-1800 Shutdown on 15 March 2018.	Voice and Text only.
3G	UMTS-2100 (band 01) urban, usually in town centres. UMTS-900 (band 08) has longer range in rural situations. Closed down on 2 February 2026.	7.2Mbit/s in some locations, 21 Mbit/s HSPA+, 42 Mbit/s DC-HSPA+
4G	LTE (band 3) 1800 MHz (rolled out to large cities in 2014). LTE (band 28) 700 MHz (has very long range) (2x10MHZ has been won in the 700 MHz auction for $44 Million) LTE (band 8) 900 MHz 3Mhz (Roll out nationwide after 2G shutdown) LTE (band 1) 2100 MHz (10 MHz, currently has limited deployment)	100Mbit/s on CAT3 4G devices in 1800 MHz coverage. 150 Mbit/s on CAT4 4G devices in 1800 MHz coverage. For 10 MHz wide channel that has been won in the 700 MHz spectrum auction, a class 3, 4 or 5 LTE device can achieve a maximum of 36.9 Mbit/s, or 79.2 Mbit/s (2x2 MIMO) download, class 1 (10 Mbit/s) and 2 (39.6 or 51 Mbit/s 2x2 MIMO).
5G	Band N78/3500MHZ; commonly used mid-band frequency	Generally, "Sub-6" 5G in New Zealand typically achieves between 300 Mbit/s - 400 Mbit/s download speed/20 Mbit/s - 50 Mbit/s upload speed; and up to 700 Mbit/s download speed/80 Mbit/s upload speed under ideal conditions; this speed is based on other providers using the same technology.

The company provides mobile services on its own cellular network. With support for 3G (UMTS 900 MHz and 2100 MHz) and 4G (LTE 700 MHz, 900 MHz and 1800 MHz). Wi-Fi Calling is also supported (handset dependent).

=== New features ===
2degrees has a few features not found on other New Zealand mobile service providers.

- The ability to get settings from the SIM menu

2degrees was the first mobile provider in New Zealand to offer Voice over WLAN/Wi-Fi calling.

=== MNC and dialing codes ===
2degrees' mobile network code is 530–24. The native STD prefix for the network is 022. New Zealand has mobile number portability, so customers switching from other networks may keep their existing mobile number.

=== Roaming ===
2degrees customers are able to roam on international networks in over 100 countries, including all three Australian networks (Telstra, Optus and Vodafone AU). Customers with handsets from some foreign networks, such as Three UK, can roam on 2degrees' network.

=== Expansion ===
In February 2011, 2degrees announced that they had obtained financing for a further $100 million network expansion.

2degrees has an ongoing network expansion in place, having recently secured financing to further expand its network and roll out a 5G network. Rangiaho Everton claimed that the auction breached the Treaty of Waitangi because she believed radio spectrum is taonga and the government has no right to sell it. Everton lodged a claim with the Waitangi Tribunal, which was upheld. It was not until Labour won the 1999 election that Māori were allocated one of the four 2 GHz 3G spectrum licences at a "discounted price" - it was given, and they were paid $5 million to "develop" it. In February 2001, Simon "Tex" Edwards, a former banker, established NZ Communications Limited. Later in 2001, NZ Communications received further financial backing from Strive Masiyiwa's Econet Wireless, which Edwards also owns shares, and then a 30% stake from the Hautaki Trust, which is the trading arm of the pan-Maori trust Te Hauarahi Tika. In 2007, NZ Communications Ltd began building towers for New Zealand's third mobile network. Customers reported seeing "NZ-24" listed in their network settings in areas with towers.

In June 2008, Trilogy International Partners, which was established in 2005 by Strive Masiyiwa, John Stanton, Bradley Horwitz and others, purchased the 26% stake from Econet Wireless in NZ Communications Ltd.

In 2009, NZ Communications changed its name to 2degrees and began a roaming deal with Vodafone New Zealand. The deal allowed NZ Communications' customers to automatically roam onto Vodafone's 2G network. At the time the deal was announced, it was suggested the deal might also be expanded to include roaming on Vodafone's 3G network too, at NZ Communications' request. Also in 2009, Trilogy increased its stake from 26% to 52% while the Hautaki Trust stake was reduced from 20% to 13%, and Eric Hertz replaced Mike Reynolds as CEO in July.

In mid-2009, 2degrees was owned by Trilogy International Partners, a US venture capital firm specializing in mobile networks (58.66%), Communication Venture Partners, a London-based company that invests in telecommunications and related software businesses (27.13%), Te Huarahi Tika Trust (10.17%) and KLR Hong Kong (0.50%). In July 2009, General Enterprise Management Services, a Hong Kong-based private equity fund, sold its 25.76 percent shares to Trilogy.

In 2012 when Tex Edwards stepped down as strategist, Trilogy owned a 58% stake in 2degrees, the Netherlands' Tesbrit BV owned a 32%, and the Hautaki Trust owned a 10% stake.

On 30 March 2013, 2degrees CEO Eric Hertz and his wife Kathy were killed when their twin-engine Beechcraft Baron, which was flying from Auckland to Timaru, ditched in the sea near Raglan at about 12:30pm after reporting engine failure. The plane was found at the bottom of the sea off the coast of Kawhia, 56 metres underwater, on 2 April. In a statement, Hertz' family thanked New Zealanders for their support. Hertz was succeeded as CEO of 2degrees by chairman Stewart Sherriff and Bradley Horwitz became chairman.

In 2016, Tex Edwards sold his remaining stake in 2degrees.

In early 2017, Trilogy International Partners owned a 73.2% stake in 2degrees. Then, Canada's Trilogy International Partners sold its 63% stake to a new entity in which Trilogy International owns a 51% stake. Later, in mid-2017, Tesbrit BV was allowed to purchase up to a 49.9% stake in 2degrees.

In August 2018, CEO Stewart Sherriff announced his retirement from 2degrees. The Commerce Commission's Telecommunications Monitoring Report from December 2018, shows 2degrees mobile market share at 21%, with Vodafone at 41% and Spark at 32%. The remainder of the market is made up of MVNO operators, Skinny with 5% and the rest with 1%.

In 2019, 2degrees' chief financial officer Mark Aue became the company's chief executive. On 14 April 2020, the company announced that they were to cut the workforce by 10% (i.e. 120 staff), stop recruitment, and reduce spending on capital projects in response to declining turnover caused by the coronavirus pandemic.

The company is part of New Zealand Telecommunications Forum.

2degrees along with One NZ and Spark New Zealand announced plans to end their 2G and 3G mobile services by 31 December 2025. The shutdown began on 14 December 2025, with 100 3G sites belonging to the Rural Connectivity Group being decommissioned during that month. 2degrees' 3G network was expected to be closed down on 25 January 2026, but it was delayed due to severe weather events. 3G services were finally switched off late at night on 2 February 2026.

=== Retail ===
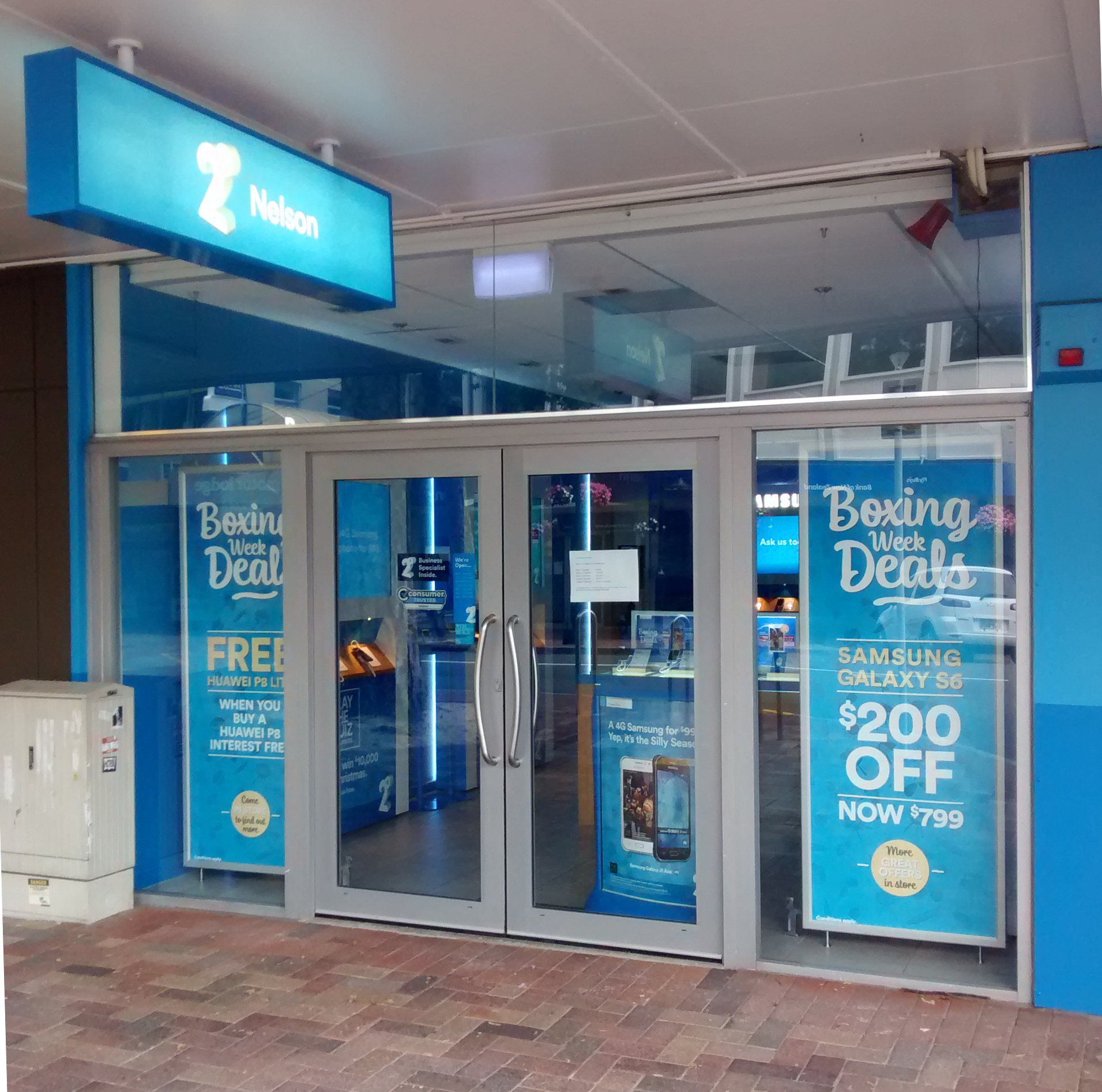
A 2degrees store in Nelson

2degrees has over 50 retail stores. The company also runs several smaller kiosk stores, which are usually in shopping centres. They also offer their products at supermarkets, petrol stations and convenience stores.

=== Services ===
2degrees halved the prevalent pricing for prepay mobile in the New Zealand market, with voice calls costing 44 cents. SMS messages are charged at 9 cents. Customers will receive 300 to 500 free SMS messages per $30–$50 prepay top-up. Also, customers will receive a special rate of 22 cents for on-network and landline calls, as well as 2 cents per on-network SMS, provided they have topped up within the last 30 days.

Mobile Zone Data became available after 3G coverage was turned on. In regards to SIM swapping, it is worth noting that the customer must have a blank SIM card which may only be purchased from the following retailers: 2degrees Mobile (walk-in & online purchases), Harvey Norman, Noel Leeming, Warehouse Stationery and JB Hifi. 2degrees SIM cards purchased from stores such as supermarkets are not blank. 2degrees previously provided an online SIM swap option, however this was removed, and now SIM swaps must be completed at one of 2degrees' retail stores.

=== Phone numbers ===
2degrees auctioned 85 special numbers on New Zealand auction website TradeMe for charity, raising over $65,000. The highest selling number was 022 888 8888, likely due to the number eight being considered lucky in some Asian cultures. New customers can choose their own number, on the 2degrees website.

== Marketing ==
2degrees has run commercials featuring Rhys Darby, a comedian known for making jokes and sketches about New Zealand life. They were filmed on location by Film Construction Ltd, a television commercial and digital content production house in Auckland.

== Criticism and complaints ==
In May 2024, the Commerce Commission filed eight charges against 2degrees for misleading claims, after which, 2degrees removed the 90 day limit on free roaming to Australia.

That same month, 2degrees was revealed to be the "most complained-about" telco in 2023 by the Telecommunications Dispute Resolution service, with an average of 0.67 complaints per 10,000 connections and an average of 0.52 complaints per 10,000 connections for mobile in July-September 2023 and October-December 2023 respectively.

== See also ==
- Telecommunications in New Zealand
