= Wellington Internet Exchange =

- Full name: Wellington Internet Exchange
- Abbreviation: WIX
- Location: New Zealand
- Website: Official website

The Wellington Internet Exchange (WIX) is an Ethernet-based neutral peering point running over the CityLink metropolitan network in Wellington, New Zealand. It is part of CityLink's ExchangeNET group of peering exchanges.

The Wellington Internet Exchange (WIX) was established to allow entities connected to the CityLink metropolitan network in Wellington to send traffic directly to and from each other rather than via their Internet service provider. This activity is known as peering.

This provides improvements in speed as traffic travels directly between the parties and reduces load on the network by reducing the need for traffic to be duplicated through one or more intermediate ISP routers. In some cases this also avoids traffic being routed "out of town", or incurring ISP's traffic charges.

Each connected entity could add specific details of networks they want to talk to directly to their routers (static routes and bilateral BGP sessions) but this quickly becomes an administrative headache as adds, changes and deletions become time-consuming and error prone if more than a few peering sessions are configured.

The Wellington Internet Exchange provides two route servers which contain routing details for each of the participants. This simplifies peering enormously for most exchange users.

The WIX has been described as a world-first for a distributed metropolitan Ethernet-based Internet exchange. WIX was also the first internet exchange to connect an OpenFlow-controlled device to the public internet.

== See also ==
- List of Internet exchange points
