= Annette Presley =

New Zealand business woman

Annette Presley ONZM
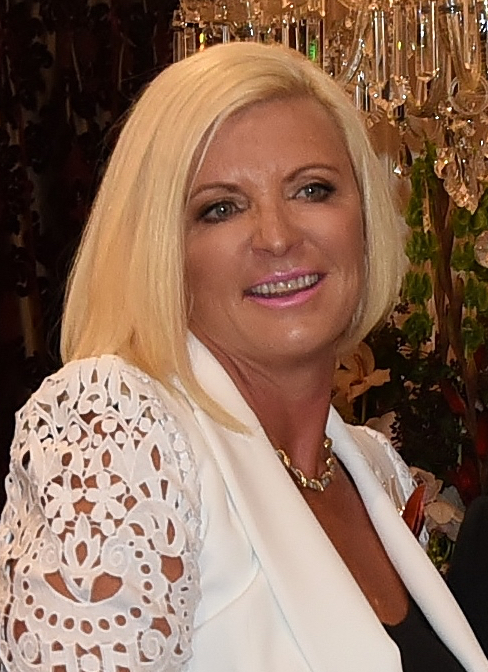
- Presley in 2016
- Born: 1964 (age 61–62); New Zealand
- Education: Auckland Technical Institute
- Occupation: Businesswoman
- Known for: Co-founder of SlingShot

Annette Sylvia Presley ONZM (born 1964) is a New Zealand telecommunications entrepreneur, known as a co-founder of Slingshot, one of New Zealand's largest internet service providers.

Presley attended McAuley High School, and studied at the Auckland Technical Institute during the 1970s, described by one tutor as "our most successful dropout".

She started her career in accounting, before switching to computer programming in 1980 after prompting from her father. Later she moved on to selling computers before launching an IT recruitment company, Stratum, in 1988.

Future husband Malcolm Dick and Presley met at a golf function in the early 1990s. In 1992 the couple moved to Australia and founded Call Australia, which grew to a $100 million business employing 200 people. They sold the company and returned to New Zealand in 1998.

The pair started CallPlus in 1996, and subsidiary i4free which became Slingshot in 2001. They each held a 45 per cent stake in CallPlus, with chief executive Martin Wylie owning the remaining 10 per cent. Presley became the public face of Slingshot, appearing in the advertising and representing the company in the media, while Dick managed the technical side. During the marriage the couple had two children, Ashley and Brandon, and the couple had been rated by the NBR Rich List having a combined worth of $870 million.

In February 2002 i4free sued Telecom New Zealand for $18,162,342, claiming Telecom's June 1999 decision to force internet users to dial a "0867" prefix had severely limited growth of the company, delaying the launch of the service by nine months. Telecom settled out of court in 2005 after a long-running battle. She stated the result "was enough to remove the grimace from my face, but not to have me breaking into laughter." Over the duration i4free had incurred nearly $1 million in court costs.

From 2004 she regularly appeared in the media alongside other competitors of Telecom demanding the government unbundle the local loop, which eventually became a reality on 9 August 2007. Being one of Telecom's most ardent critics, Presley even offered to do former CEO Theresa Gattung's job for $1.

Dick and Presley had an acrimonious marriage break up in 2006, which spilled over into the business when CallPlus announced in September that she was no longer a director. Presley was holidaying in Fiji at the time and had not been informed prior to the announcement.

Presley has appeared on the New Zealand version of the Dragons' Den television show, and was criticised by her Series 1 co-dragon Bob Jones. She supports several charities including Preventing Violence in the Home, Dress for Success and Kidz First Children's Hospital.

In April 2015, M2 Group bought Callplus for $650m, representing a significant exit for the shareholders of CallPlus.

As of September 2015, Presley is now helping women in business by funding startups with female founders through the Lightning Lab XX program run by Creative HQ in Wellington, New Zealand.

In the 2016 Queen's Birthday Honours, Presley was appointed an Officer of the New Zealand Order of Merit for services to business and women.
