= UKNOF =

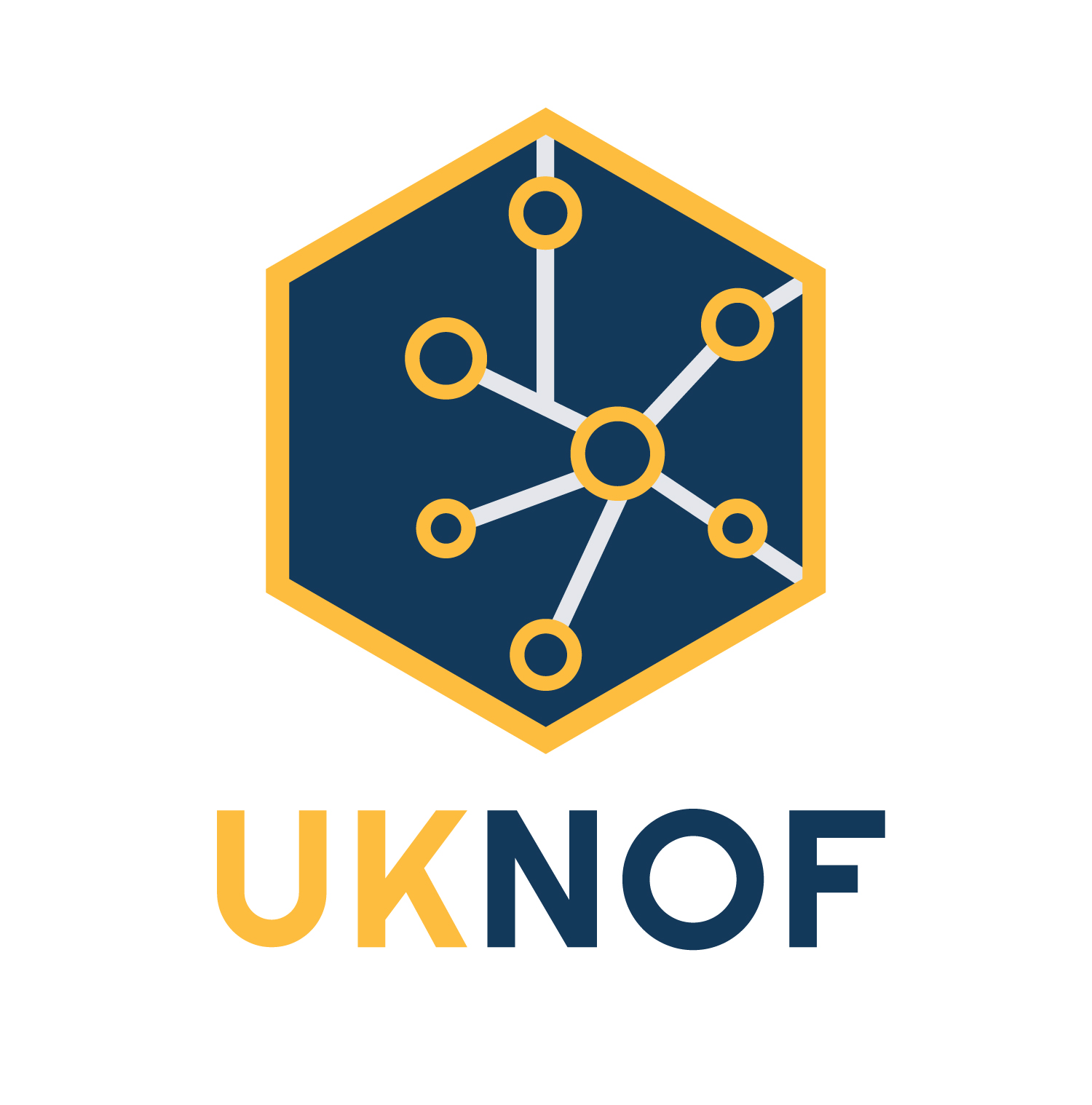
UKNOF Logo

UKNOF (United Kingdom Network Operators' Forum) was an open forum for the exchange of operational and technical information for Internet network operators in the United Kingdom.

Three one-day events where held per year, and are vendor-supported so attendance is free.

UKNOF was notable for including regular Internet history presentations as part of a project to collect information about the history of the UK Internet.

Events were primarily organised by a volunteer Programme Committee drawn from UK and international Internet operations community – the people on this committee come from various network operations aligned organisations.

The UKNOF's legal entity (UKIF Limited) is overseen by a six-person Board of Directors, guided by an Advisory Committee.

The last UKNOF was held on September 27th to September 28th, 2023; it was the 52nd event held.

UKNOF was closed down in 2024. Ongoing UK network infrastructure community events are now held in the NetUK context.
