= Eric Hertz =

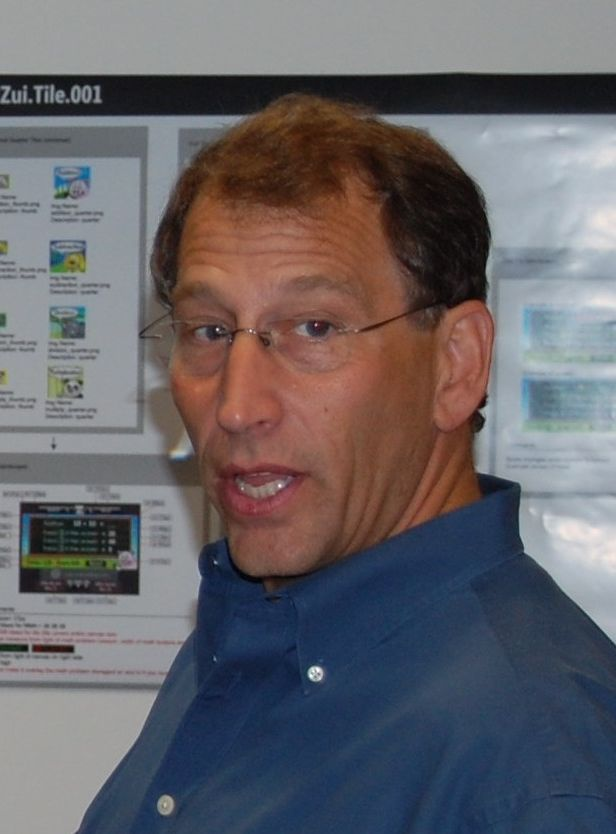
- Hertz in 2007
- Born: Eric Bennett Hertz; December 31, 1954
- Died: March 30, 2013 (aged 58); Kawhia, New Zealand

Eric Bennett Hertz (31 December 1954 – 30 March 2013) was an American executive and the CEO of 2degrees, New Zealand's third largest mobile telecommunications company at the time of his leadership.

Hertz was responsible for the installation of the first cellular phone system in Portland, Maine in the 1980s. His future wife, Kathy, worked in a management role for AT&T in New York and New Jersey; they married in 1983. He worked for BellSouth in Ecuador, where he learnt to speak Spanish fluently.

Hertz moved to New Zealand with his wife and daughter in 2009 and had acquired permanent residency, calling New Zealand home. In his opinion, quality of life in New Zealand was unequalled and he "didn't know why people leave".

Under his leadership 2degrees grew its customer base to over one million connections.

Hertz and his wife, Katherine (Kathy) Marie Picone Hertz, died after their twin-engine Beechcraft Baron crashed into the sea near Kawhia Harbour on Saturday, 30 March 2013 NZDT.

The plane was found on the seafloor, 56 metres (184 ft) underwater, on 2 April. In a statement, Hertz's family thanked New Zealanders for their support. Hertz was succeeded as CEO of 2degrees by chairman Stewart Sherriff.

Royal New Zealand Navy diving ship HMNZS Manawanui was sent to the site of the submerged plane on 5 April, and local iwi put a rāhui on the area. The aircraft wreckage was recovered and moved to the Devonport Naval Base for examination by Civil Aviation Authority of New Zealand (CAA) accident investigators.

The CAA concluded that for unknown reasons, the aircraft's airspeed decreased to the point that control could not be maintained, causing it to enter a spin from which Hertz did not recover. The aircraft had an aftermarket turbocharger system installed under a supplemental type certificate (STC) and previously had a left-hand turbocharger problem that was never conclusively diagnosed; investigators found that the left-hand engine control settings were abnormal, suggesting that Hertz had been troubleshooting in flight, and found anomalies in the left engine intake ducting and a separated left engine manifold pressure line, which the STC manufacturer said would cause a partial but not complete loss of engine power. The CAA determined that the Baron was flying in thick clouds (instrument meteorological conditions) at the time, and speculated that while Hertz was dealing with an undetermined left-hand engine problem, the autopilot applied full nose-up trim to maintain altitude, causing the airspeed to steadily decay, which Hertz did not notice due to a lack of situational awareness in the clouds. The CAA further noted that Hertz had been prescribed medication for major depressive disorder and generalized anxiety disorder, which had not been reported to his aviation medical examiners; this should have disqualified him from holding both his New Zealand pilot licence and his United States pilot certificate.
