= Tampere Region Exchange =

Internet exchange point company in Finland

TREX Regional Exchanges
- Full name: TREX Regional Exchanges Oy
- Abbreviation: TREX
- Founded: 2002 (traffic began 2003)
- Location: Finland, Tampere
- Website: trex.fi
- Members: 16
- Ports: 24
- Peak in: 3,0Gbps
- Peak out: 3,0Gbps
- Daily in (avg.): 1,0Gbps
- Daily out (avg.): 1,0Gbps

The TREX Regional Exchanges Oy (TREX) operates an Internet exchange point in Tampere, Finland. TREX was established in 2002 and traffic on its first switch started in 2003. TREX was preceded by some local private peering arrangements between its initial members since the 1990s. TREX is a member of the European Internet Exchange Association.

TREX is a company that provides Internet exchange point services to connected Internet operators. This differs from many other IXPs which are associations that Internet operators join as members in order to connect and exchange traffic.

TREX tries to provide both a service platform and a research platform for the Internet and they have taken part in a number of research projects over the years. TREX also tries to promote the adoption of new Internet technologies. For example, TREX provides public Teredo server and relay and NAT64 test services as a result of some past and present research projects.

== Network ==
The primary TREX switch is an Arista Networks low-latency 10 Gbit/s cut-through switch. Connecting Internet service providers (ISPs) bring their own SFP or SFP+ module to match their connection choices such as speed, distance and Wavelength division multiplexing.

There are a number of smaller secondary switches, which are mostly used for TREX's services and a couple of ISPs connecting over 1000BASE-T.

== TREX Workshops ==
TREX also hosts annual Internet network operators' group meetings called TREX Workshops, in Tampere. These are currently the only open gatherings for ISPs and the peering community in Finland. The seminar topics change from year to year, but the presentations are always in English to attempt to appeal to international visitors.

== Services ==
The idea is to develop new services that an exchange point can provide to its member networks. These are typically not services that end users could use directly. Rather, the member networks are supposed to refine them further for user consumption. Typical services adopted by many exchange points world wide are root name service and stratum 1 time service. TREX participates in The AS112 Project which is an any cast name service.

== See also ==
- List of Internet exchange points
