= Orcon Limited =

New Zealand telecommunications company

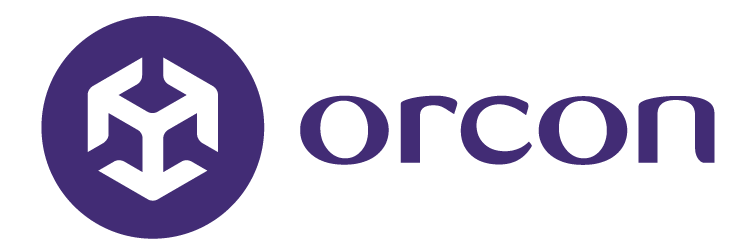
- Trade name: Orcon
- Company type: Subsidiary
- Industry: Telecommunications
- Founded: 1996
- Founder: Seeby Woodhouse
- Headquarters: Auckland, New Zealand
- Area served: New Zealand
- Key people: Mark Callander, Group CEO
- Products: Telephony, Internet connectivity, hosting
- Number of employees: 300+
- Parent: 2degrees
- Website: www.orcon.net.nz

Orcon Limited (trading as Orcon) is a New Zealand telecommunications company. It is New Zealand's fourth largest Internet service provider (ISP). In 2013 it had a 5% share of the fixed line market.

== History ==
Seeby Woodhouse founded Orcon by starting a small business (Orcon Group Limited) while at university in 1994. The startup provided computer advice and support, as well as selling early-model cell-phones and accessories. Demand led the business to expand its scope to include PC upgrade and repair services. Orcon remained focused on the local market on Auckland's North Shore. By 1996 the business had expanded its range of products and sphere of operations. It began distributing computer accessories and supplies to small-business owners and to home users throughout the Auckland region and to other parts of New Zealand as required.

In 1997 Orcon Group commenced as an ISP with three dial-in 33.6k modems. Through the start-up phase it focused on the no-frills end of the market, aiming at skilled and technically minded customers, with pricing at half the price of the cheapest competition. In 2002 Orcon became a major ISP in the residential market; it launched a new web portal and undertook marketing initiatives to grow the customer base that positive word-of-mouth had established.

On 12 June 2007 Kordia, a state-owned telecommunications company, purchased Orcon for NZ$24.3m, effectively nationalizing it. Seeby Woodhouse, an 80% stakeholder, made $19.44 million from the deal, while business-partner Mark Mackay pocketed $4.86 million. As of 2014 Orcon's main competitors included Telecom and Vodafone.

In June 2014 the company was bought by CallPlus (later Vocus Group). Vocus Group merged with 2degrees in June 2022.

== Local-loop unbundling ==
Orcon issued a press release on 9 August 2007 stating that they had become the "first 100% kiwi owned telecommunications provider" to install equipment in the first unbundled Telecom exchange at Ponsonby. On 30 August 2007, Orcon released an additional press release to announce that they had successfully connected a trial customer at ADSL2+ speeds to their DSLAM via local-loop unbundling (LLU). In March 2008 Orcon launched their ADSL2+ service in parts of Auckland, becoming the first ISP to commercially provide ADSL2+ in New Zealand.

Orcon has been a key participant in recent years in New Zealand's LLU process, which is a rapid u-turn from past public statements by former chief executive Seeby Woodhouse. A Computerworld article from 2005 describing a joint letter by several ISPs to the Commerce Commission quotes Woodhouse as saying he did not sign the letter because he did not agree with the request for local loop unbundling. With LLU, Woodhouse says, only the bigger players such as ihug (now Vodafone), TelstraClear (also now Vodafone), and possibly CallPlus (Slingshot) could afford to put their own equipment into the exchanges.

== Ultra-Fast Broadband ==
Orcon was the first retailer to begin providing fibre as part of the Ultra-Fast Broadband (UFB) scheme. In September 2011, Orcon announced that a group of Northland schools were set up for service, with Orcon delivering telecommunications over fibre in partnership with Orewa-based internet service provider Watchdog Corporation Ltd.

== Genius Go ==
In June 2013, Orcon launched Genius Go, a smartphone app that allows customers to make local 'landline' calls and receive calls to their home phone line via their smartphone, wherever they are in the world.

== See also ==
- Internet in New Zealand
