= Quicksilver (ISP) =

- Industry: Internet service provider
- Founded: 1999; 27 years ago in New Zealand
- Defunct: August 2006
- Fate: Acquired by Woosh
- Headquarters: Parnell, Auckland, New Zealand
- Area served: New Zealand
- Website: quicksilver.net.nz at the Wayback Machine (archived 2006-04-24)

Quicksilver was an ISP based in Parnell, Auckland, New Zealand. It offered broadband, dialup and toll's services around New Zealand. Quicksilver was an activity of Mercury Telecommunications Ltd, a company formed by Matthew Hobbs and Mark Frater, both ex-employees of CLEAR Communications.

Quicksilver was sold to Woosh, an Auckland-based wireless ISP in August 2006.
