= CallPlus =

New Zealand telecommunications company

CallPlus was a telecommunications company providing phone, calling, internet, mobile and advanced connectivity services to New Zealand businesses. Since 2016, CallPlus has been part of the Vocus Group, which is the third-largest telecommunications company in New Zealand, and fourth-largest in Australia.

Annette Presley and Malcolm Dick (married at the time) founded the company in 1996. Presley, Dick, and Martin Wylie, former company secretary of Telecom New Zealand, are the company directors.

In 2001, CallPlus launched Slingshot – an Internet Service Provider (ISP) focusing specifically on the residential market, positioning CallPlus as a business telecommunications company. Also in 2001, CallPlus was the first provider in New Zealand to offer VOIP. Continuing to innovate, CallPlus was the first telco in New Zealand to offer SIP Trunk capability.

In 2012, the company launched Flip – a low cost ISP for the residential market.

In June 2014 the company bought internet service provider Orcon.

In April 2015 the company was acquired by M2 Group.

In 2016, M2 Group and Vocus Communications merged, forming Vocus Group, and in July 2017 CallPlus was rebranded to Vocus Communications – making Vocus Communications a full service telco for NZ businesses and organisations of all sizes.

In February 2020, The Commerce Commission announced that CallPlus, along with other Vocus subsidiaries Orcon and Flip, had been fined $121,500 for billing customers after their contracts had ended. All three subsidiaries pleaded guilty to making false representations in invoices they sent to customers.
