= Rural Connectivity Group =

Joint venture by New Zealand mobile network operators

- Trade name: Rural Connectivity Group
- Industry: Telecommunications
- Founded: 2017
- Headquarters: Level 20, Lumley Centre, 88 Shortland Street, Auckland, New Zealand
- Area served: New Zealand
- Key people: Andrew Button (Executive Programme Director); Richard Spencer (Head of Procurement and Commercial); Krishna Guda (Head of Finance)
- Website: thercg.co.nz

The Rural Connectivity Group (RCG) is a joint venture by New Zealand's three mobile network operators – One NZ, Spark and 2degrees.

Crown Infrastructure Partners contracted with the Rural Connectivity Group to bring 4G mobile and wireless broadband coverage to rural New Zealand under the Rural Broadband Initiative Phase Two and the Mobile Black Spot Fund.

By July 2024 the RCG had built 500 new mobile cell-sites, delivering high speed wireless broadband to at least 30,000 additional rural New Zealand households. Its purpose was to increase New Zealand's mobile land coverage area by up to 25 per cent, and deliver mobile calling and data service to a further potential 780 kilometres of New Zealand's state highways. It aims to provide high-speed broadband to the greatest possible number of rural users and improve mobile coverage on state highways and at key visitor destinations.

All three mobile network operators now share spectrum, network equipment and have one set of antennae on each tower, using Multi Operator Core Network (MOCN) technology.

== Mobile Coverage and rollout ==
In June 2018, one RCG site had been installed at Haast on the West coast of the South Island. The Haast site was fast tracked due to lobbying from locals citing safety issues with a 244km mobile black spot between Fox Glacier and Lake Hāwea. It was only 3G capable (with satellite back-haul) and was later upgraded to 4G as infrastructure became available.

The original contract builds were due for completion by the end of 2022 however the new schedule (May 2018) aims to have them substantially finished by the end of 2021 – a year earlier than previously planned.

The 500th tower was installed at Anawhata in July 2024, marking a major milestone for the project. The RCG network has matured into a 4G LTE network using Multi-Operator Core Network (MOCN) technology shared by One NZ, Spark and 2degrees.

Haast gains mobile services as Rural Connectivity Group switched on a new 3G tower, 7 May 2018
