= Multi-operator radio access network =

The use of multi-operator radio access networks (MORANs), also known as radio access network sharing, is a way for multiple mobile telephone network operators to share radio access network infrastructure.

Moran includes sharing of the same hardware such as BTS by multiple users; this leads to increased use of the same bandwidth and also improves efficiency by rendering an increased amount network coverage for both the telecom operators.
