= Slingshot (ISP) =

New Zealand telecommunications company

Slingshot Communications Limited
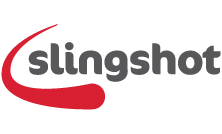
- Type: Subsidiary
- Industry: Internet service provider Telecommunications
- Founded: 1996
- Headquarters: Auckland, New Zealand
- Key people: Mark Callander (CEO)
- Products: Broadband; Dialup; Telephone; VoIP; Mobile phone
- Parent: 2degrees
- Website: slingshot.co.nz

Slingshot is the fourth largest telecommunications company in New Zealand. It has an approximately 16% market share of the New Zealand fixed telephone landline and residential broadband market. There are 300+ employees who all work in Auckland CBD.

== History ==
Slingshot was founded in 1996 by Malcolm Dick and Annette Presley. The company was established as part of the CallPlus group of companies to provide residential customers with internet and toll calling services.

In 2016, M2 Group and Vocus Communications merged, forming Vocus Group, and in July 2017 CallPlus was rebranded to Vocus Communications.

On 1 June 2022, Vocus Group merged with telecommunications company 2degrees.

== Activities ==
- 2013 – Launched New Slingshot "Global Mode", Free on all Slingshot Broadband connections
- 2013 – Sponsored TV3's new flagship current affairs show "3rd Degree"
- 2012 – Finalist at the World Forum Broadband Awards in Amsterdam, for Broadband Unlimited
- 2012 – Launched Rollover Data for Free on all Broadband Connections
- 2011 – Launched Unlimited Broadband at only $60
- 2011 – Free Wi-Fi for Auckland City and Rugby World Cup supporters
- 2009 – Cited by NZ Herald Survey as New Zealand's Top Broadband Provider
- 2007 – Best Internet Service Provider – People's Choice Awards
- 2005 – TUANZ Broadband Innovation Award
- 2002 – i4free legal battle victory
  On 22 February 2002 i4free/Slingshot filed a claim in the High Court of New Zealand against Telecom for $18 million in damages to the business, breach of contract and a breach of the Commerce Act sections 27 and 36. This claim originated from April 2000 when i4free won a High Court injunction to stop Telecom from acting to disconnect further i4free customers.

== Products ==
- Homeline & Broadband
  Slingshot's core products are a range of Homeline and Broadband bundles.
- Broadband Unlimited
  In October 2011 Slingshot launched its Broadband Unlimited plan.
- Naked Broadband
  Naked Broadband allows Slingshot customers to have a Broadband connection at home without the need for a fixed Homeline.
- Calling and Tolls
  Slingshot provides National, International and Landline to mobile calling rates with base calling plans.
- Slingshot Mobile
  Slingshot mobile was started in 2009 as a challenger brand with a low cost point of difference. Originally Slingshot offered mobile services via a Mobile Virtual Network Operator service over Vodafone's network.

== Products & Services ==
- Rollover Data
  Slingshot was the largest ISP in New Zealand to introduce Rollover Data in October 2012 at no cost onto all of their broadband plans.
- Un-metering online content On 4 April 2012, Slingshot was the first ISP in New Zealand to un-meter Quickflix content. This meant that customers streaming content via Quickflix.co.nz were not charged for the data usage on their Slingshot account.
  This was followed shortly afterwards by Slingshot un-metering all streaming content on iSKY and eventually IGLOO. This allowed customers to stream as much of the media catalogue from these providers without the concern of data usage.
  In June 2013, SKY TV made some network changes to improve the viewing experience for on-demand customers when video streaming. This change to how SKY TV hosts content in NZ meant that all internet providers in NZ (including Slingshot) were no longer able to un-meter content from iSKY or IGLOO.
- Subscription TV – IGLOO
  On 17 April 2013, Slingshot launched a new product called the "IGLOO Home bundle". This further increased Slingshot "Whole of Household" product offering and provided customers with a full communications package.
- Global Mode
  On 19 June 2013, Slingshot launched a free add-on to all of its Broadband plans called "Global Mode". Global Mode lets overseas visitors to New Zealand enjoy some of their favourite international web services from the convenience of a Slingshot Broadband connection. This is known as place-shifting.
  New Zealand has a rather tarnished reputation of being an "Internet Backwater" and Global Mode helps combat this by allowing visitors to continue accessing some of their favourite sites while in the country and on a Slingshot connection.
  Global Mode has received a significant amount of media attention since launch, with feature stories in the NZ Herald, TV3 News, NBR, Wall Street Journal and the BRW. In 2015, Global Mode ceased and Netflix and Hulu among other geo-blocked internet sites became geo-blocked again.

== Market Position ==
Slingshot is the third largest ISP in New Zealand. As of 2015, it has 16% of the residential market.

== Criticism ==
On 15 August 2008, Slingshot came under criticism from the public and the media about a problem with their web cache. The cache, set up to solve a known problem with YouTube, caused private information of customers to be shared among other customers. The error caused users logging into websites such as Gmail, Facebook, Bebo and TradeMe to be given access to the accounts of other Slingshot customers who were using those websites at the same time, instead of their own accounts. Similar incidents occurred with Slingshot in September 2007 and May 2008

In December 2013 Slingshot was fined $NZ 250,000 after it admitted transferring competitors' customers to its business without authority. Slingshot pleaded guilty to 50 charges under the New Zealand Fair Trading Act in the Auckland District Court and admitted it had transferred 27 customers' accounts from other ISPs to Slingshot without the customers' authority.
