= CityLink Limited =

New Zealand telecommunications company

CityLink Limited was a telecommunications company based in Wellington, New Zealand. It operated a network of fibre optic cabling around the CBDs of Wellington and Auckland, and had a network of Wi-Fi hotspots around Wellington. It also operated ExchangeNET, a nationwide network of peering exchange points, and a content distribution network.

The company was formed as an initiative of the Wellington City Council in 1995, and started with a fibre-optic network in the Wellington CBD in 1996, run along the overhead network used for the city trolley buses (although the main power and telephone lines in the CBD were underground). The company became part of the TeamTalk Group.

As of 30 April 2019, CityLink and the TeamTalk Group came together under one brand, Vital Limited.
