= Virtual channel =

Method of remapping a digital program stream to a channel number

In most telecommunications organizations, a virtual channel is a method of remapping the program number as used in H.222 Program Association Tables and Program Mapping Tables to a channel number that can be entered as digits on a receiver's remote control.

Often, virtual channels are implemented in digital television to help users select channels easily and, in general, to ease the transition from analogue to digital broadcasting. Assigning virtual channels is most common where TV stations were colloquially named after the RF channel they were transmitting on ("Channel 6 Springfield"), as was common in North America during the analogue TV era. In other parts of the world, such as Europe, virtual channels are rarely used or needed, because TV stations there identify themselves by name, not by RF channel or callsign.

A "virtual channel" was first used for DigiCipher 2 in North America. It was later called a logical channel number (LCN) and used for private European Digital Video Broadcasting extensions widely used by the NDS Group and by NorDig in other markets.

Pay television operators were the first to use these systems for channel reassignment and rearrangement to allow them to group channels by content or origin and, to a lesser extent, to localize advertising.

Free-to-air stations using Advanced Television Systems Committee standards (ATSC) used the same television frequency channel allocation that the NTSC channel used when both were simulcasting. They achieved this by the DigiCipher 2 method. Viewers could then use one number to bring up either service.

Free-to-air DVB network operators, such as DTV Services Ltd. (d.b.a. Freeview) and Freeview New Zealand Ltd., use the NorDig method and follow the same practice as pay-TV operators. The exception is Freeview Australia Ltd., which also use the NorDig method and partly follow the ATSC practice of using the same VHF radio-frequency channel allocation that the PAL channel is simulcasting on from the metropolitan station's main transmission point (ie. 2, 7, 9, and 10) with the major and minor format emulated by multiplying by ten.

== Implementation ==
The DigiCipher 2 method uses a privately defined virtual channel table (VCT) to set the channel's major and minor numbers that appear separated by a decimal point or dash on-screen. The major number for ATSC represents the original analog or non-simulcast channel frequency, while the minor is a sequentially assigned number for the selected channel with zero reserved for the analog channel. The channel may be hidden from the viewer.

DVB extensions use privately defined descriptors within the Bouquet Association Table for DVB-S or the Network Information Table for DVB-T. The NorDig version allows for marking a channel as hidden, while the NDS Group version simply omits the channel entry.

The DVB system neither promotes nor mentions either system due to the fact that the already-defined H.222 Program number and Transport Stream ID can achieve the same purpose and also hide a channel by simply omitting it from the Program Association table.

All these methods share the principle of not allowing any viewer reordering as could be achieved under analog and generic digital systems. This locked-down ordering is one of the main criticisms of these methods.

== Digital television multiple channels ==
Because DTV can carry any number of streams (referred to as multiplexing), program numbers can be used to group them into more than one channel which can then be reassigned by virtual or logical channel numbers.

=== United States and Canada ===
An example of the ATSC major and minor numbers would be to have main programming airing on say channel 8 (the "major channel") with analog on 8.0 and digital on 8.1 (the first two "minor channels") with other entertainment channels below 8.99 on channels 8.2, 8.3, and up and informational data channels ranging from 8.100 to 8.999. The channels can be displayed using a hyphen (such as 8-1) or a space; however, on a common seven-segment display, a decimal point would save one segment. The decimal point is more familiar to FM radio listeners who tune by frequency rather than channel, and avoids confusion with ranges of values (for example, 2-4 may be misinterpreted as the range 2 to 4 instead of the fourth sub-channel of channel 2).

Most US stations follow ATSC numbering guidelines; however, low-power stations such as New York City's WNYZ-LD are exceptions. It was temporarily broadcasting on VHF channel 6 in digital, but used the virtual channel 1.1, instead of 6. This persisted for approximately one year, after which WNYZ-LD reverted to low-power analog.

The assignment of virtual channels in the US is defined within the stream via terrestrial or cable versions of a "Virtual Channel Table" as outlined by ATSC document "A/65", Annex B. Rules for assignment of major channel numbers are:

- Existing analog stations were assigned a major channel number matching their analog number.
- New digital stations assigned to a channel whose matching major channel number is not active use that number.
- New digital stations assigned to a channel whose matching major channel number is in use (by a former analog station) must reciprocate, using the major channel number that matches the actual channel of the station in question.

These rules generally prevent overlapping, although in the case of stations where large numbers of stations in adjacent markets are in close proximity, it is possible that overlaps can happen (see, for example, the cases of WJLP and WDPN-TV). Additionally, stations may broadcast some of their subchannels under major channel(s) in the 70–99 range, so long as multiple stations do not attempt to use the same major channel(s). These numbers are certain to be unused, as 69 was the highest assigned channel prior to digital broadcasting. The document does not address the use of certain other major channel numbers:

- Numbers below 70 that were never used in NTSC (0, 1 and 37)
- The real numbers of stations that are using virtual channels from 38 to 69 (these stations are not covered by the reciprocity rule, as real station numbers are not assigned above 36.)
- Numbers in the range of 38–69 that are not used by a former analog station

Broadcasters that own more than one station with overlaps in coverage area may have all of their channels use the major channel of one of the stations, so long as minor channel numbers do not overlap.

When the US began buying licenses in a broadcast spectrum auction in 2017, it allowed companies that had a duopoly in a market to sell one license, but continue to use the virtual channel of the sold channel on a subchannel of the other. For example, Sunbeam Television sold WLVI in the auction, but was allowed to use its virtual channel 56 on WHDH, which uses virtual channel 7 for its main channel; thus, the WHDH license uses both virtual channels, 7 and 56, on the same license.

The range for pay TV free-to-air local stations is from 2 to 29. All other channels are based on the service provider's preference.

=== Mexico ===
When digital television arrived, most stations used virtual channels that matched their analog channels. A few branded their physical channel (such as XHMNU-TDT in Monterrey, which took virtual channel 35. Television there is more centralized than in other ATSC countries—three of the four national commercial networks brand their Mexico City channel numbers. New entrants such as Grupo Imagen were almost universally on UHF, and would be disadvantaged by higher virtual channels than stations that began on VHF.

On October 27, 2016, the Federal Telecommunications Institute (IFT) led a coordinated switch of all virtual channels. The plan eliminated much of the local variance for national and regional networks. E.g., Canal 5, a national network, used 25 different virtual channel numbers before the plan standardized it as channel 5 nationwide.

The IFT accredited awarded nine national television networks national rights to a virtual channel. The IFT also awarded common numbers to 14 regional networks (primarily operated by state governments) and virtual channels to nearly 100 local stations. Local stations were mostly assigned to channels 4, 8, 9, 10, and 12. Some retained existing channel numbers, particularly if they broadcast on UHF in analog.

The largest exception to standardization is on the US-Mexico border, where due to the presence of US stations on desired virtual channels and objections from the US Federal Communications Commission.

=== Australia ===
Allocation of logical channel numbers is governed by guidelines set by the commercial broadcasters' association, Free TV Australia.

These are defined within the terrestrial broadcast stream using the NorDig descriptor format within the DVB Network Information Table.

LCNs in Australia may have one, two or three digits. Each network is allocated LCNs with a prefix - for instance, all metropolitan Nine Network services use LCNs beginning with the digit '9'. Generally, but not always, the single-digit LCN is allocated to the primary SD service (Network 10's high definition-channel 10 HD is the main exception). LCNs need not be contiguous, and a channel may be identified by more than one LCN. For instance, ABC Television's primary ABC TV service is allocated LCNs 2 and 21; the latter allows it to be easily accessed amongst other ABC services which lie in the 21–24 range.

Regional affiliates of the three metropolitan networks are provided with their own LCN prefix. For instance, channels owned by affiliates of the Nine Network (in this case NBN Television) are prefixed with the digit 8 rather than 9. This allows areas that are part of both a metropolitan market and a regional market, such as the Gold Coast, Sunshine Coast and Central Coast, to receive all local commercial services. The ABC and SBS use the same prefix in all areas.

Prefixes for remote-area services are intended to overlay this model. Services licensed for the Remote Central and Eastern Australia licence area (Imparja and Southern Cross Central) received metropolitan prefixes corresponding to their affiliation; those in Remote Western Australia (GWN and WIN WA) received "regional" prefixes.

Some LCNs are reserved:

- LCN 4 was originally intended for a free-to-air video program guide. Instead, the LCN 4 prefix has been largely unused, except in Sydney (where it was used by the Digital Forty Four trial datacasting service from 2004 to 2010). Since 2010, capital city community television stations (or "Channel 31" stations, after their typical analogue channel position) use LCN 44.
- LCN range 350-399 is intended to be allocated by receivers to channels which either duplicate a stronger signal's LCN, or are transmitted without an LCN. For instance, if two broadcasts of LCN 2 were found, one signal (generally the stronger) will be allocated to LCN 2, and the weaker should be allocated to, say, LCN 350.
- The LCN range 450-499 is intended for use by trial services by non-broadcasters.

=== Europe, Africa and the Middle East ===
Europe, Africa and the Middle East do not use a special numbering system for subchannels; two related "channels" (that is, programme streams) may have unrelated numbers (for example, in the United Kingdom, ITV is channel 3 and its digital sister channel ITV2 is channel 6 on Freeview).

In the United Kingdom and Ireland, Freeview channel numbers are defined within the terrestrial broadcast stream using the NorDig descriptor format within the DVB "Network Information Table".

In continental and eastern Europe, virtual channels are not used, since television sets and receivers there allow users to freely assign arbitrary numbers or letters to channels.

Stations still market themselves as "first", "second", or "third" channel (and so on), or "channel A", "channel B" or "channel C", etc., but this reflects historic or colloquial usage, or is done for marketing purposes. For example, in Germany the term "third programme" refers to the local public station, which was usually the third TV station to go on air in most areas. These terms are unrelated to the transmitting RF channel. Referencing the above example, the third programmes in Germany never transmitted on an RF channel below 21.

Virtual channels are used on direct broadcast satellites, such as Dish Network, DirecTV, and Astra. Rather than a few dozen channels with a few subchannels each, these services map to a range of hundreds of individually numbered channels. This is true of digital cable and satellite radio services, as well.

=== Japan ===
Digital terrestrial TV broadcasters in each region are allocated a "remote control key ID" (or, "remocon key ID"), numbered from 1 to 12. Remote control ID allocations for broadcasters outside the Kanto region generally follow their Tokyo-based network flagships; however, some stations in some prefectures deviate from this. This system is limited to 16 broadcasters per region.

Each underlying channel is then assigned a three-digit number, which is based on their assigned remote control ID, followed by the sub-channel number. For example, NHK Educational TV is assigned remote control ID 2 (nationwide). Their primary channel is therefore assigned virtual channel 021. If the broadcaster multichannels (of which the ISDB-T standard allows up to three standard-definition streams), the additional streams would be assigned virtual channels 022 and 023, respectively. Standards allow for a maximum of eight virtual channels per broadcaster (in this example 021-028).

Additional datacasting services use virtual channels in the 200–799 range – in this example, the network could use the 22x, 42x and 62x ranges.

=== New Zealand ===
The allocation of logical channel numbers is governed by Freeview and inserted into the transport stream by mostly Kordia maintained equipment with the encoding done by TVNZ who also do the encoding for all other non critical DVB metadata such as the EPG and channel naming.

SKY Network Television define their own channel numbering which uses a similar NDS encoded format. They wholesale their channels to the only other local pay TV operator Vodafone and to the short lived Telecom First Media.

Freeview LCNs are encoded within a terrestrial broadcast stream using the NorDig descriptor format within the DVB Network Information Table. And within the two satellite broadcast streams also using the NorDig descriptor format, but is instead within the DVB Bouquet Association Table (BAT). The BAT is used on satellite, so channel region-ization can be done on certified receivers (i.e., channel order locked receivers).

=== Philippines ===
Virtual channels were initially assigned to TV networks who were then in operation. In 2010, the National Telecommunications Commission adopted ISDB-T.

LCN used in ISDB-T was pre-assigned to the currently operating networks in digital TV. Small-player GEM HD on DZCE-TV was the first network to adopt ISDB-T. It was assigned to LCN 2.11 which used analog channel 49. Government-owned People's Television Network or PTV was assigned to 1.1, using its analog channel 48 because of its status as government-owned. High definition channels were assigned the decimal "11", while a multiple-SD channel used decimal with "1, 2, 3... and so on" as its subchannel.

=== Indonesia ===
LCN is given by the Directorate General of Post and Telecommunications (Dirjen Postel) Kemenkominfo RI to television stations that are tenants of multiplexing channels. The LCN can be revoked if the television station broadcasting license is revoked or if there is an arrangement for LCN numbering by the government. Television stations can apply for changes to their LCN numbers, but must meet the requirements of the Director General of Post and Telecommunication.

The following are the virtual channel numbers (generally the same in various regions despite different frequencies, sometimes each regional or transmission station has a different numbering configuration from the main network):

Channel name	LCN	Owner
TVRI Nasional	1	LPP Televisi Republik Indonesia
TVRI Regional Stations	2	LPP Televisi Republik Indonesia
TVRI World	3	LPP Televisi Republik Indonesia
TVRI Sport	4	LPP Televisi Republik Indonesia
Kompas TV	11	KG Media
BTV	12	B Universe
Sin Po TV	14	Sin Po Media
JPM	15	Jawa Pos Group
MDTV	16	MDTV Media Technologies
Garuda TV	17	Digdaya Media Nusantara
CNBC Indonesia	18	Trans Media
CNN Indonesia	19	Trans Media
Trans TV	20	Trans Media
Trans7	21	Trans Media
Metro TV	22	Media Group
SCTV	23	Surya Citra Media
Indosiar	24	Surya Citra Media
RTV	25	Rajawali Corpora
antv	26	Visi Media Asia
tvOne	27	Visi Media Asia
RCTI	28	MNC Media
MNCTV	29	MNC Media
GTV	30	MNC Media
iNews	31	iNews Media Group
Nusantara TV	32	NT Corp
Harum TV	33	NT Corp
Gold TV	34	NT Corp
Moji	35	Surya Citra Media
Mentari TV	36	Surya Citra Media
VTV	37	Visi Media Asia
Magna Channel	38	Media Group
BN Channel	39	Media Group
Jagantara TV	77	Visi Media Asia

In terrestrial digital television reception, because the reception position is close to other areas, sometimes two or more channels host the same TV station. Virtual channel numbering assigns the corresponding virtual channel number to TV stations whose signal is stronger, and weaker ones to be placed on channel entries of 800 and above. Likewise for TV stations that do not have virtual channels or whose virtual channels have not been configured.

==== Grouping of virtual channel numbers in terrestrial TV ====
TVRI and private TV MUX tenants	National TV Channel	Special genre TV channels	Excess TV channels or no LCN
0-19	20-99	100-799	800 until so on (tentative by digital channels)

== Digital radio ==
Digital radio also uses channels and subchannels in the DAB format. iBiquity's HD Radio uses HD1, HD2, ..., HD7 channels. HD1-3 are available in FM hybrid mode, while all seven HD channels are available in the pure digital mode.

IBOC system (Digital Radio Mondiale) stations do not currently use any virtual channels because of the limited bandwidth available in analog sidebands.
