= Yahoo New Zealand =

New Zealand web portal

Yahoo! New Zealand
- Website type: Internet portal
- Owner: Yahoo! Australia
- Website: https://nz.yahoo.com/
- Registration: Optional
- Launched: March 2007

Yahoo! New Zealand is the New Zealand branch of the web portal Yahoo, which provides search, news, and sports news, among other services. It was operated by a joint venture between Yahoo!7 and Telecom New Zealand called Yahoo!Xtra from 2006 until 2011.

== History ==
=== XtraMSN ===
Telecom launched Internet service provider Xtra in 1996, which was New Zealand's largest ISP (as of 2008). In 2001, Telecom partnered with MSN to create the web portal XtraMSN, which by 2006 was receiving over 100 million total page impressions per month. Visitor numbers to XtraMSN grew by 45 percent in its last two years and the website attracted more than 3 million unique browsers per month.

=== Yahoo!Xtra ===
Yahoo!Xtra
- Type: Joint venture
- Industry: Media
- Founded: December 2006
- Headquarters: Auckland, New Zealand
- Services: Internet portal
- Owner: Yahoo!7 (51%); Telecom New Zealand (49%)
- Number of employees: 30+ in Auckland; 10 in Sydney

In December 2006, Telecom made a new agreement, founding a joint venture with Australia's Yahoo!7 – itself a joint company between the Seven Network and Yahoo! – to form Yahoo!Xtra. The six-year-old Telecom and Microsoft portal ended on 1 March 2007, with the users invited to go to either YahooXtra.co.nz or Msn.co.nz.

Yahoo!7 held a 51 percent stake in the company and Telecom NZ held 49 percent. Because Yahoo!7 was a 50/50 venture, Yahoo! proper was therefore a 25.5% owner of Yahoo!Xtra.

Yahoo!Xtra's 'X meets Y' promotion at launch featured a television commercial with Regina Spektor's song "Fidelity" playing whilst a young couple undertake in a lingering kiss. This helped throw the anti-folk star under the spotlight in the New Zealand music scene, "Fidelity" becoming a hit single and one of Spektor's most successful tracks.

Telecom reportedly left the content management of the portal to Yahoo!, which operates an Auckland-based office consisting of Sales, Marketing, Ad Operations, Production, and Finance departments. The Editorial team manages local news, sport and entertainment content.

Telecom announced in April 2011 that it had sold its share to Yahoo!7 and Yahoo!Xtra was rebranded as Yahoo! New Zealand.

=== Yahoo! New Zealand ===
When Telecom sold out in 2011, Yahoo!Xtra staff transferred to Yahoo! New Zealand. Telecom noted that Yahoo!7 would continue to support Telecom's broadband customers.

== Xtra Mail ==
Even after Telecom released its stake in Yahoo!Xtra, Yahoo! continued to provide Telecom's email service, which came under criticism in early 2013 following a spam and phishing attack described as the biggest to have ever hit New Zealand. Telecom automatically reset thousands of users' passwords. In April, Telecom announced that despite the issue, it would keep Yahoo! on as an email provider.

Between September 2016 and April 2017, Telecom – by this point known as Spark New Zealand – migrated Xtra Mail from Yahoo! to spark.co.nz. Spark partnered with New Zealand email provider SMX.
