= I Am (2010 American drama film) =

- DVD cover for the film I Am
- Directed by: John Ward
- Written by: John Ward
- Produced by: John Ward; Todd Zeile; Chris Marcus; John Ward
- Starring: Tomas Boykin; Jay Hindle; John Ward; Todd Zeile; Stefan Hajek; Amy Holland
- Cinematography: Chris Marcus
- Edited by: Chris Marcus
- Music by: Christian Lundberg
- Production company: Bay Ridge Films
- Distributed by: 20th Century Fox
- Release date: October 1, 2010
- Running time: 89 minutes
- Country: United States
- Language: English

I Am is a 2010 faith-based, non-linear, drama film written and directed by John Ward, produced by John Ward, Chris Marcus, and professional baseball veteran Todd Zeile, through Bay Ridge Films and Upper Room Media and released by 20th Century Fox. Co-produced by Stefan Hajek and Aaron Breeden, and shot and edited by Chris Marcus, the film stars Tomas Boykin, Jay Hindle, Todd Zeile, John Ward, Greg Fisk, Amy Holland, Christinna Chauncey, and Stefan Hajek. On October 10, 2010, the film had a limited release in 2,500 churches worldwide in preparation for its DVD release of November 2, 2010.

== Background ==
Documenting 10 people and their failure to follow the 10 commandments, the project was in production for 18 months. I Am is a series of modern-day lessons from the Ten Commandments and was produced from a minimal budget by the creators and producers of the 'Liquid Series' in Los Angeles, Newport Beach, and Irvine, California, over various shooting days in 2008 and 2009. The feature film has been often described as a "Christian Crash" both by Hollywood executives and Christian pastors.

== Cast ==
- Tomas Boykin as I Am
- Jay Hindle as Lance Vita
- John Ward as Aaron Rossdale
- Todd Zeile as Trevor Evans
- Stefan Hajek as Jake Russell
- Amy Holland as Alice Bordeaux
- Kate Bishop as Elaine
- Greg Fisk as Dr. Ortus
- Christinna Chauncey as Angelica Vita
- Gary Edward as Selani
- Laura McHenry as Eva
- Josie Gammell as Lt. Everett
- Clay Randall as Spenser Hamilton
- Rosalie Autumn Miller as Liz
- Garrett Zeile as Will Evans
- Courtney Duckworth as Sarah Russell
- Ace Marrero as Officer Allegro
- Rosalie Autumn Miller as Liz
- Marijana Pecijarevska as Selani's Girlfriend
- Clay Randal as Spenser Hamilton
- Erin Stegeman as Dr. Carmichael

== Production and marketing ==
I Am was created and produced by the same team that created the Liquid DVD series, and was shot with the support of, and in cooperation with, Mariners Church in Irvine, California. Many locations were donated as were the talents of many team members. As an alternative to a traditional theatrical release, the producers and distributors opted instead to release the film as a world premiere screening across North America in 1,500 churches before release to the general public.

=== Music ===
The film soundtrack for I Am features songs by both Christian and secular groups and artists, such as Katharine McPhee, Michael Johns, John Driskell Hopkins (of Zac Brown Band), Rasa 9, and Travis Ryan. Original score for the film was composed and produced by Christian Lundberg. Music supervisor was Stefan Hajek.

- "Salvation is Here" - Travis Ryan
- "Fools Gold" - Michael Johns
- "Say Goodbye" - Katharine McPhee
- "Free” - Tim Timmons
- "Don’t Run Away” - Tim Timmons
- "Facedown" - Sandfrog
- "Save Yourself" - Sandfrog
- "Cool As We" - Stickfigure
- "Lazy Man" - John Driskell Hopkins
- "Girl" - Joel Eckels and Paper Sun
- "Bittersweet Illusion" - JetStream
- "Halfway to Happiness" - JetStream
- "On and On" - JetStream
- "I Am" - Jessica Specht
- "Say Goodbye" - Rasa 9

A music video for the song, "Say Goodbye," by Katharine McPhee, features footage from the film.
