= Jolie Hodson =

New Zealand businesswoman and chief executive officer

Jolie Hodson MNZM
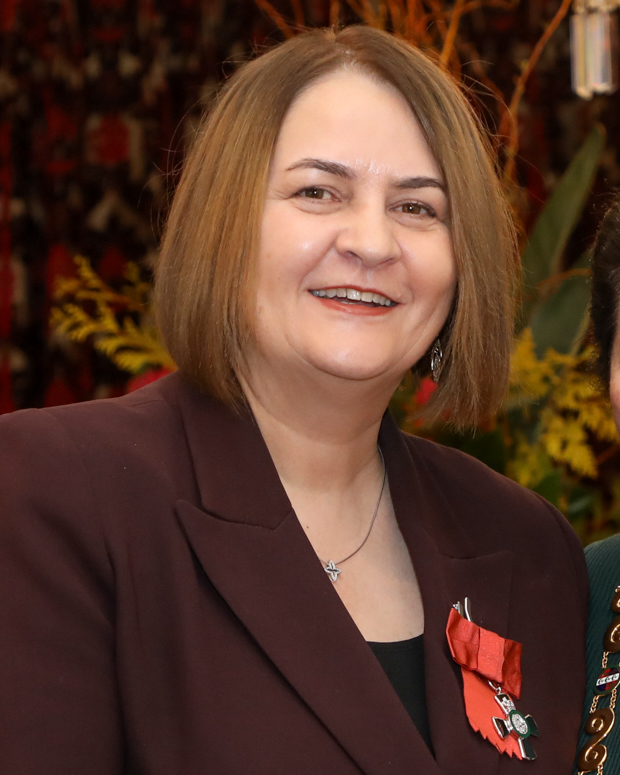
- Awards: Member of the New Zealand Order of Merit

Jolie Hodson MNZM is a New Zealand businesswoman, and was made Chief Executive of telecommunications company Spark in 2019. Hodson is a co-founder of On Being Bold, an online collective sharing the stories of successful women's career paths to inspire businesswomen. In 2024 Hodson was appointed a Member of the New Zealand Order of Merit for services to business, governance and women.

== Career ==
Hodson is Māori and affiliates to Ngāpuhi, Rongowhakaata and Ngāti Kahungunu iwi. She attended Westlake Girls High School in Auckland, and then earned a Bachelor of Commerce from the University of Auckland in 1991. She then worked in the audit team at consultancy firm Deloitte, and in the brewing company Lion in Australia. Hodson joined Spark as Chief Financial Officer in 2013. She was appointed Chief Executive of Spark Digital in 2016, and then CEO of Spark in 2019, following on from Simon Moutter.

Hodson has led or been involved in a number of initiatives aimed at increasing diversity in leadership, including achieving increased representation of women on the board and senior management of Spark. In 2017 Hodson co-founded On Being Bold, an online collective sharing the stories of successful women's career paths to inspire businesswomen. Her co-founders were Dame Therese Walsh, Joan Withers, Cathy Quinn, Dame Paula Rebstock, Alison Gerry, Silvana Schenone, Royal Reed and Frances Valintine.

Hodson is a member of the Climate Leaders Coalition Steering Committee, and became convenor in 2022. The coalition reports annually on climate change actions taken by their 88 members. As convenor, Hodson encouraged the incoming National-led government to take action on addressing climate change.

Hodson is a Fellow of Chartered Accountants Australia New Zealand.

== Honours and awards ==
In the 2024 King's Birthday Honours Hodson was appointed a Member of the New Zealand Order of Merit for services to business, governance and women.

In 2016 Hodson was awarded Deloitte Chief Financial Officer of the Year award, and in 2022 she was named CEO of the Year at the Deloitte Top 200 Business Awards.

Hodson was inducted into the North Harbour Business Hall of Fame in August 2024.
