= Todd Zeile =

American baseball player (born 1965)

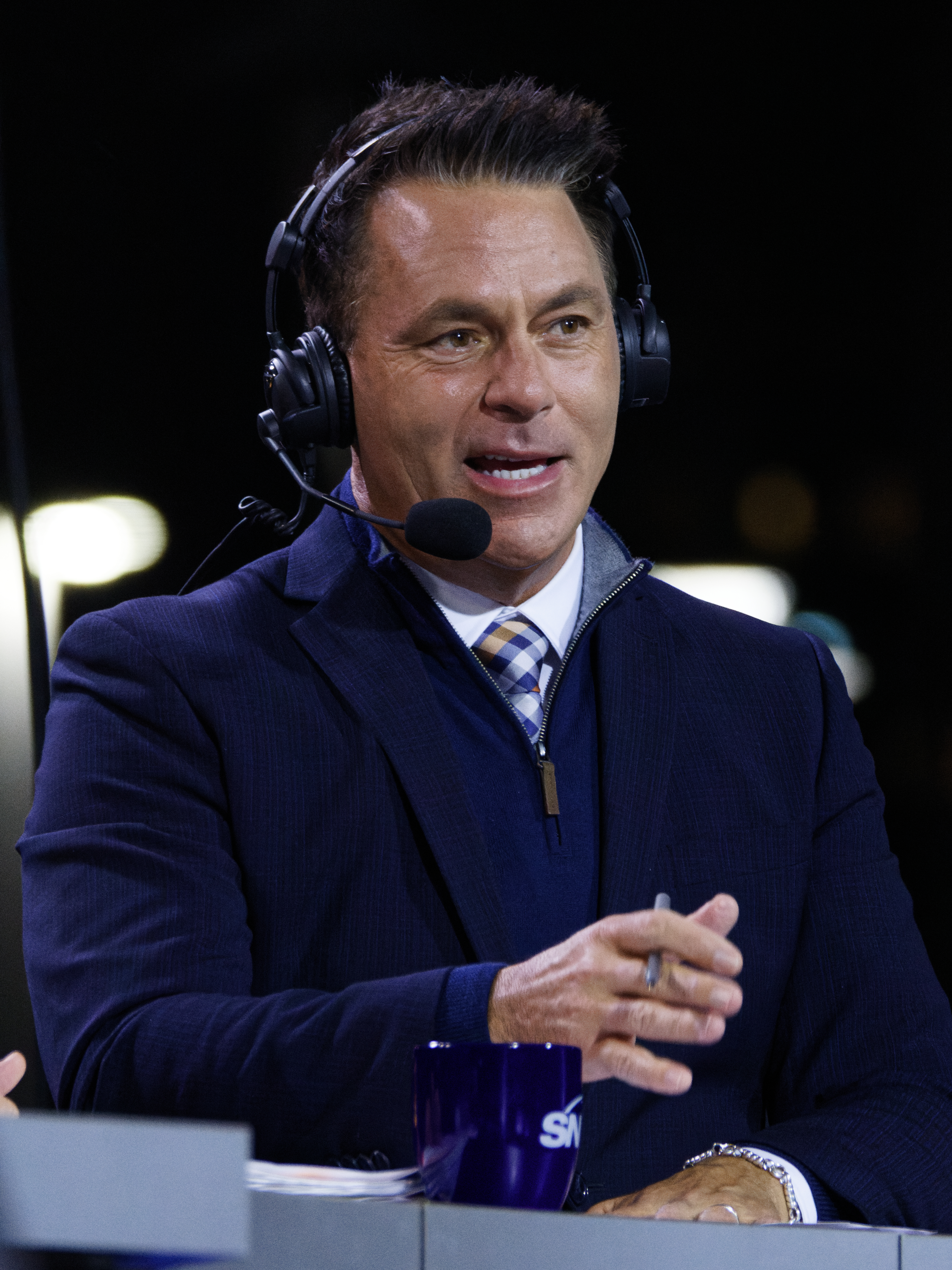
- Zeile during an SNY broadcast in 2022
- Third baseman / First baseman
- Born: September 9, 1965 (age 61); Van Nuys, California, U.S.
- Batted: Right Threw: Right

MLB debut
- August 18, 1989, for the St. Louis Cardinals

Last MLB appearance
- October 3, 2004, for the New York Mets

MLB statistics
- Batting average: .265
- Hits: 2,004
- Home runs: 253
- Runs batted in: 1,110
- Stats at Baseball Reference

Teams
- St. Louis Cardinals (1989–1995); Chicago Cubs (1995); Philadelphia Phillies (1996); Baltimore Orioles (1996); Los Angeles Dodgers (1997–1998); Florida Marlins (1998); Texas Rangers (1998–1999); New York Mets (2000–2001); Colorado Rockies (2002); New York Yankees (2003); Montreal Expos (2003); New York Mets (2004)

Todd Edward Zeile (/ziːl/; born September 9, 1965) is an American baseball commentator. He is primarily known as a former professional baseball player, having been a third baseman, catcher, and first baseman in Major League Baseball (MLB). He played 16 seasons, from 1989 to 2004, for 11 teams: St. Louis Cardinals, Chicago Cubs, Philadelphia Phillies, Baltimore Orioles, Los Angeles Dodgers, Florida Marlins, Texas Rangers, New York Mets, Colorado Rockies, New York Yankees, and Montreal Expos. Zeile graduated from UCLA, where he played collegiate baseball primarily as a catcher. He currently serves as a main pregame and postgame analyst for the Mets on SNY.

== Playing career ==
=== Early career ===
Zeile broke into the majors in 1989 as a catcher and the Cardinals' most anticipated prospect of the year. Cardinals manager Joe Torre wanted to make room for catcher Tom Pagnozzi and believed Zeile would be a more productive hitter and would have a longer career if he moved from behind the plate, so Zeile moved, with some reluctance, initially to first base and then to third base in 1990.

=== Middle career ===
Zeile spent most of the 1990s as a third baseman. He batted .268 with 20 home runs and 80 RBI in 134 games with the Philadelphia Phillies in 1996 until he was acquired along with Pete Incaviglia by the Baltimore Orioles on August 29 of that year in a transaction that was completed when Calvin Maduro and Garrett Stephenson were sent to Philadelphia on September 3 and 4 respectively. He was traded from the Los Angeles Dodgers to the Florida Marlins along with Mike Piazza in 1998 for five players, then was traded to the Texas Rangers later that season. In 1999, Zeile was part of a historic Rangers team. Along with Gregg Zaun and Jeff Zimmerman, he was one of three players on the team whose last names began with "Z". Not since the 1916 Chicago Cubs, with Heinie Zimmerman, Dutch Zwilling, and Rollie Zeider, had this occurred.

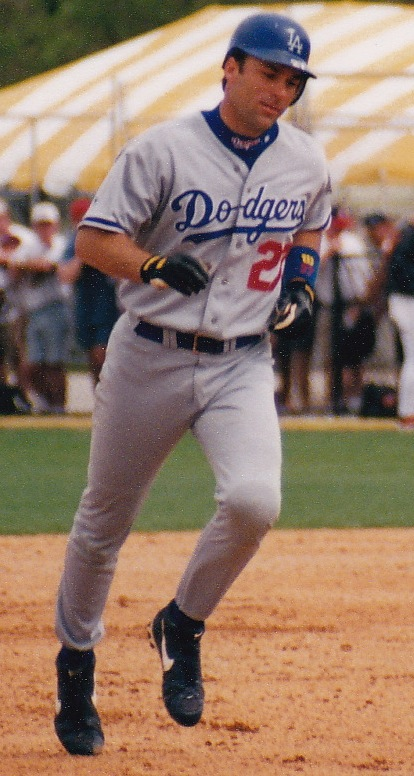
Zeile with the Dodgers in 1998

In 2000, Zeile signed a contract with the New York Mets and moved to first base to replace John Olerud, and participated in the World Series that year. In 2002, he was traded to the Colorado Rockies, where he moved back to third base. He led all National League third basemen in errors in 2002, with 21, when he had the lowest fielding percentage in the league (.942).

=== Later career ===
After one season with Colorado, Zeile became a free agent again and signed with the New York Yankees in 2003. He was released mid-August and was signed by the Montreal Expos three days later. Having decided 2004 would be his last season, Zeile returned to the Mets. He also voiced displeasure with the Yankees, saying that he has "no desire to play again for that organization", and that "I think some of the things that happen over there are different than any other organization in baseball. I have a pretty good track record to judge that."

Zeile retired following the 2004 season. Having planned his retirement in advance (and with the Mets well out of the playoff race), Mets manager Art Howe let Zeile once again start as a catcher, his original position, on September 18, 2004. It was Zeile's first appearance there in 14 years. It was the second-longest span ever between appearances at the position. Gabby Street caught a game in 1931 after last having caught in 1912. Zeile's span is now the third longest, with Craig Biggio starting the penultimate game of his career at catcher in 2007 after not playing the position for 16 years.

Zeile got one final start as a catcher two weeks later on October 3, 2004, in the season's final game, as the Mets' regular catcher, Jason Phillips's foot hurt him and he could not play. In the sixth inning, in his final at-bat as a major leaguer, Zeile hit a three-run home run to left-field off of Expos pitcher Claudio Vargas. In the eighth inning, in his final play as a major leaguer, Ryan Church popped up to him, as a catcher, in foul territory. It was also John Franco's last out made as a Met pitcher. The Mets won the game, 8–1. Both games Zeile caught in his final season were started by Tom Glavine.

He also pitched an inning with the Mets when they didn't have any pitchers left, as he gave up five runs in the eighth inning in the Mets' 19–10 loss to Montreal on July 26, 2004. It was his second appearance as a pitcher, having also appeared in a game for the Rockies in 2002.

On October 3, 2004, he became one of 69 players (as of 2026) ever to hit a home run in his final at bat. Zeile's final home run also made him the last person ever to hit a home run off a Montreal Expos pitcher. Following that game, which was the last of the season, the Expos moved to Washington, D.C. and became the Washington Nationals.

Zeile ended his career having hit at least one home run for each of the 11 teams he played for over the course of his career, distinguishing him as the only player in major league history to have hit a home run for over 10 teams.

== Film work ==
After retiring from MLB, Zeile pursued two other passions: film production, and acting. He founded Green Diamond Entertainment, a film production company in West Hollywood, California, during his second stint with the Mets. He appeared in the following:

- Saturday Night Live (television series, 1997)
- Dirty Deeds (movie, 2005—produced by Green Diamond Entertainment)
- The King of Queens (television series, 2005–2006, two episodes)
- Liquid: Live at Five (video, 2007)
- Liquid: Money Talks (video, 2008)
- Liquid: The Ten, Volume One (video, 2008)
- I Am (movie, 2010)

He was also executive producer of Dirty Deeds and a producer of I Am.

== Baseball analyst on television ==
A 2015 Sports Illustrated profile of Zeile included the following:

When Zeile retired from the Mets in 2004, he moved back to the Los Angeles area, where he’d grown up. He had no interest in the traditional baseball afterlife: a gig as a big-league coach or a TV talking head. “Some guys eat, breathe and sleep baseball 24/7, but I always had other things I wanted to do,” he says.

He jumped into real estate, tried his hand as an entrepreneur and dabbled in the local pastime—working as a film and TV producer. He has learned that if there’s one thing as hard as making it in the big leagues, it’s making it in Hollywood. “Taking a broadcast job, spending your days on the golf course—that’s the expected route,” he says. “I went against the grain.”

In 2019, Zeile joined SNY, the Mets' television network, as a studio analyst. He became the lead commentator on Mets' pre- and post- game shows, while regularly appearing on the network's Baseball Night in New York show as well. In 2022, he won an Emmy Award as Best Sports Analyst.

== Personal life ==
Zeile was born in Los Angeles during one of Sandy Koufax's no hitters pitched at Dodger Stadium, while his father listened to the game, which was attended by Zeile's father-in-law, MLB coach Tom Gamboa. Zeile grew up a fan of the Dodgers, often attending their games.

Zeile attended William S. Hart High School in Santa Clarita, California, where he was an outstanding student-athlete.

Zeile is a direct descendant of Presidents John Quincy Adams and John Adams.

Zeile was married to Olympic champion Julianne McNamara, the first American gymnast to earn a perfect 10.0 at the Olympics. They have four children, including son Garrett (b. November 27, 1993), and daughter Hannah (b. November 7, 1997), who has Type 1 diabetes. As a result, Zeile and McNamara have been particularly active in juvenile diabetes research charities. They divorced in January 2015. Their daughter Hannah appeared on the TV series This Is Us as teenager Kate Pearson.

On June 27, 2020, Zeile married Kristin Gamboa (now Kristin Zeile), daughter of ex-major league coach and minor league manager Tom Gamboa.

Zeile is good friends with Charlie Sheen, with whom he has collaborated on Hollywood projects. Together they have traveled frequently around the US and various countries worldwide.

Zeile's nephew, Shane Zeile, was drafted by the Detroit Tigers in the fifth round of the 2014 Major League Baseball draft.

== See also ==
- List of Major League Baseball career home run leaders
- List of Major League Baseball career hits leaders
- List of Major League Baseball career runs batted in leaders
