= Xtra (ISP) =

Former New Zealand brand

Xtra Limited
- Type: Subsidiary
- Industry: Telecommunications
- Founded: 1996; Incorporated 14 June 2001
- Defunct: 2008
- Fate: Brand largely retired, internet products merged into parent company Spark
- Headquarters: Level 8 North Tower Telecom House; 68 - 86 Jervois Quay; Wellington
- Key people: Craig Mulholland, director Roderick Snodgrass, director
- Products: Internet service provider
- Website: telecom.co.nz/broadband (2007 archive)

Xtra was a brand used by New Zealand telecommunications provider Spark (previously Telecom) for its internet service provider subsidiary from 1996 to 2008. At its inception, Xtra provided only dial-up internet access, but it began providing ADSL service in 1999.

The brand was largely retired in 2008, with internet services adopting the name of Xtra's parent company, Telecom (now Spark). Today, the Xtra brand remains active only as the name of Spark's webmail service, powered by New Zealand-based SMX.

The Xtra name was also used for Yahoo!Xtra, a joint venture web portal between Telecom and Yahoo!7 that operated between 2007 and 2011, as well as XtraMSN (a joint venture with MSN).

== History and trading practices ==
In 1999 Telecom created New Zealand's only ADSL service. Telecom later allowed other ISPs to access its ADSL networks (under increasing government and public pressure), although some claimed that Telecom provided unfair and monopolistic terms of trade regarding its wholesale ADSL services.

As a subsidiary of Telecom New Zealand, Xtra retained some of the monopoly that its parent company formerly had. To many people, this monopoly was regarded as an unfair advantage over other ISPs. Many lobbyists, including Slingshot's CEO Annette Presley, persuaded New Zealand's Communications Ministry to force the unbundling of Telecom's local loop, so as to make fairer trading terms and lessen Xtra's ISP monopoly. The company breached the Fair Trading Act 1986 at least eight times between 2003 and 2010.

=== ORBS ===
During 2001 Xtra and Actrix (another New Zealand Internet service provider) won a High Court injunction to force Alan Brown, the maintainer of the Open Relay Behavior-modification System (ORBS) anti-spam blacklist, to remove them from the list. ORBS was a blacklist of IP addresses relating to open mail relays like those run by Xtra, which enable spammers to send unsolicited bulk e-mail. Hundreds of organisations subscribed to the list, including Bigfoot.com and at least one other large free mail provider. They rejected e-mail from any IP address listed in ORBS. The court action led (indirectly) to the end of one of the oldest DNSBL services.

=== Go Large Plan ===
Xtra's "Go Large" plan was introduced as New Zealand's first completely unlimited ADSL service in November 2006. There was much public criticism and disappointment at the instability and general slowness of the newly introduced plan. The plan was advertised with unlimited data usage and maximum speed. However, it was not clearly stated on advertisements that there was a fair use policy and traffic management that restricted users to a download limit between 4pm and 12am. If one were to continually exceed this limit, they would be placed in a "download pool", or contacted with offers to switch to another plan. This triggered a lot of media attention and an investigation was launched. By 22 February 2007, Telecom decided to refund all of its Go Large customers (approximately 60,000) with amounts of at least $130 per customer. This had been caused in part by the overwhelming complaints and criticisms Telecom Xtra had received due to under-delivering on the promises of the Go Large plan. It is speculated that the refund may have cost Telecom Xtra between NZ$7.5 and 8.5 million.

The plan was eventually grandfathered, and in mid-2009 was succeeded by the Big Time plan, where Xtra openly informed users about traffic management. As of 30 October 2009, Telecom cancelled the Go Large broadband plan for all existing customers, offering alternative plan options such as the Big Time plan. On 20 May 2010 Telecom cancelled Big Time, and customers were moved back to capped plans.

== Web portals ==
Xtra's original web portal, 1996.

Xtra's original web portal opened in 1996 and offered two different experiences - XWorld and Text World. Later, XVille was also introduced. You could choose which version of Xtra you visited using a front screen called Xtra Theme Park. XWorld was a virtual world where you could click on virtual buildings to perform functions (such as searching via Yahoo!). Text World was a simpler interface using just text for slower modems.

This all changed in 1999 when a single, more streamlined interface was created and the current Xtra logo was first unveiled.

XtraMSN was one of Xtra's trading names and was used as the branding for its default home page for customers. The name came from a deal between Xtra and MSN, a merger of Xtra's homepage xtra.co.nz with Microsoft New Zealand's msn.co.nz. Several other MSN services were cobranded with Xtra in the XtraMSN brand (e.g. Hotmail). Several versions of capitalising XtraMSN were used by Telecom and Microsoft New Zealand in their promotional literature.

In 2007 Xtra changed to Yahoo! in Microsoft's place. Their main portal was then Yahoo!Xtra.

== Technical issues ==
=== Yahoo!Xtra Bubble problems ===
During the change from MSN to Yahoo, Telecom experienced much backlash over a change in email set up. Part of the agreement between Yahoo and Xtra provided that Xtra's email addresses be moved over to Yahoo servers in Australia. To access their Yahoo!Xtra Bubble email accounts, customers had to change advanced settings such as port numbers and authentication, in addition to basic settings such as mail server.

The move to Yahoo!Xtra Bubble caused trouble for many small business owners and website hosting companies in New Zealand. Yahoo's aggressive antispam policies caused business owners to lose bookings and caused major delays for some customers in receiving emails. The Dominion Post brought the problem to the fore on 26 November 2007 and showed that responsibility for the trouble was shunned by Xtra.
Xtra pushed the blame back to the hosting companies:
"Telecom spokesman Nick Brown denies there are technical problems with the service, and blames web-hosting companies for forwarding mail without filtering it first for spam."
The problem with their denial was that Xtra/Yahoo's email system forwarded spam in the same manner.

Reports of Xtra's email troubles appeared on blogs, forums and newsletters as people realised that emails were not arriving. New Zealand Tourism Online's October 2007 newsletter reported that they "found several clients who have not been getting accommodation enquiry or booking emails due to the filter system."

One of Xtra's solutions to the problem was telling their users to add the sender of the email to their contacts list. This caused the email be redirected to the inbox, however the immediate deferral of email by Yahoo's email servers could cause delays of many hours. This was a problem that Xtra inherited by joining with Yahoo.

Yahoo denied that they use greylisting practices however "unusual traffic" or "complaints from Yahoo! Mail users" may trigger greylisting against your email server causing a four-hour delay.

=== Yahoo!Xtra email problems ===
Xtra customers were hit with multiple email spam problems from February 2013 (80,000 affected) to mid April 2013. The symptoms were suspicious spam and phishing types of email. Telecom advised customers to delete any suspicious emails and to change their account password. Problems continued in November and December, when a Yahoo-operated server went down, affecting thousands of Xtra customers in New Zealand
