= JetStream =

New Zealand telecom brand

JetStream / Mobile JetStream
- Type: ADSL broadband service (JetStream); CDMA2000 3G wireless Internet (Mobile JetStream)
- Manufacturer: Telecom New Zealand

JetStream and Mobile JetStream are two former brand names used by Spark New Zealand (at the time known as Telecom) to market its retail and resale ADSL-based fixed line and CDMA2000-based 3G Wireless Internet access offerings respectively. The retail ADSL offering from its own Internet service provider, Xtra, was commonly referred to by the company as Xtra Broadband. "Jetstream" is no longer used, and was later replaced with "Ultra" for their Broadband and Mobile offerings. Xtra branding was retired in 2008.

Retail ADSL offerings (using Telecom's network) from non-Telecom ISPs such as Vodafone and Slingshot (ISP) were often sold under the resale option. The Jetstream partnering program was retired in August 2005. Resellers were then migrated to retail plans that either use Telecom's wholesaled WBS or UBS ADSL offerings.

VDSL and Fibre broadband started becoming more popular options in 2014, eventually being overtaken by fibre, offered by Chorus, a lines company that was spun off from Telecom in 2011.
