= Jo Cribb =

New Zealand women's advocate

Dr Jo Cribb
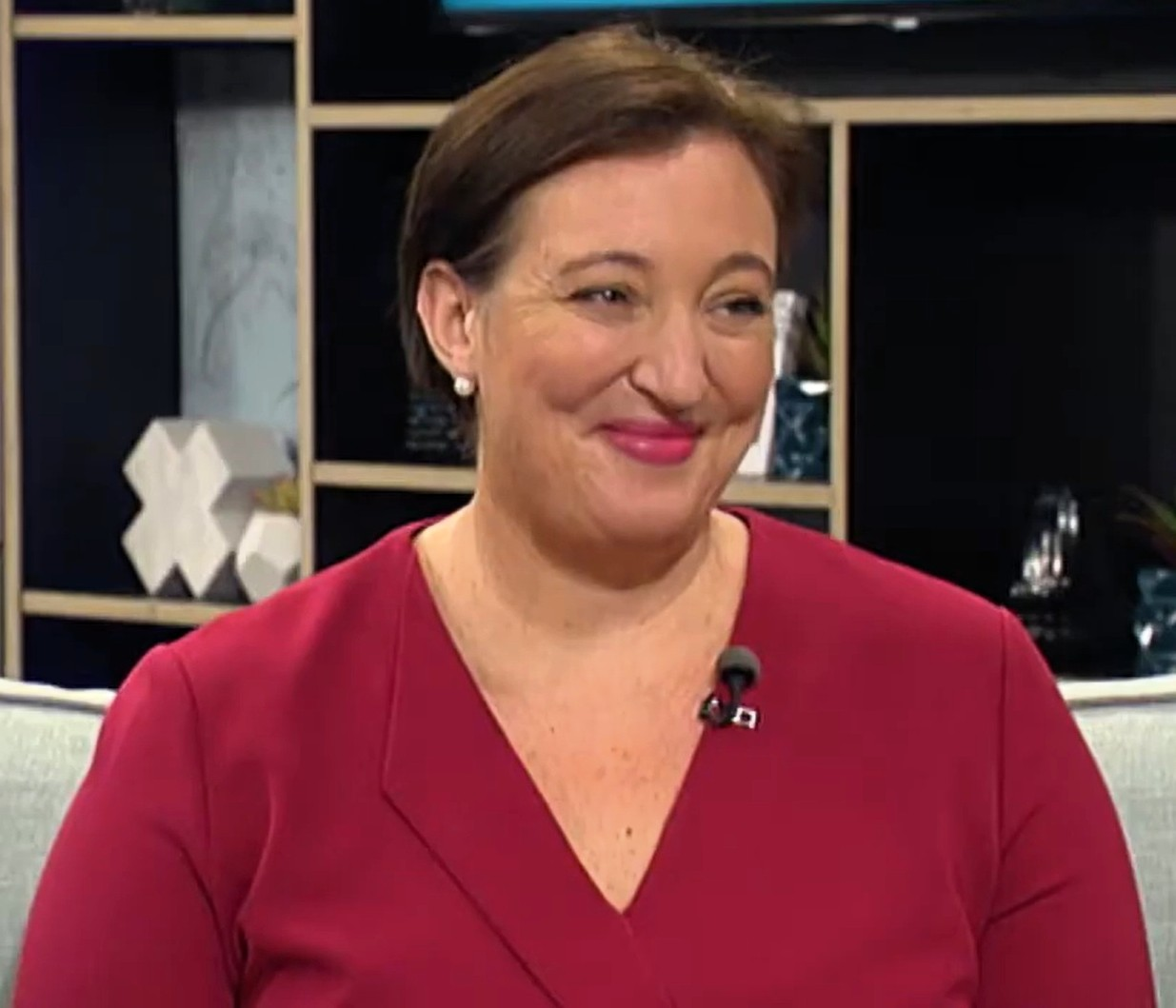
- Cribb in 2018
- Education: Victoria University of Wellington; Cambridge University
- Title: Chief Executive; Ministry for Women Affairs
- Term: 2021 - 2017
- Predecessor: Kim Ngarimu (Acting)
- Successor: Renee Graham
- Website: http://www.jocribb.co.nz

Jo Cribb is a New Zealand women's advocate who previously headed the Ministry for Women. She has given a talk at TEDxWellington and published work on volunteerism.

== Education ==
Cribb is a graduate of Cambridge University and has a PhD from Victoria University of Wellington in Public Policy that investigated the contracting relationship between governments and NGOs which completed in part as a New Zealand Federation of Graduate Women Fellow.

== Career ==
Between 2012 and 2017, Cribb held the appointment as chief executive for the Ministry for Women Affairs. Prior to this, she led policy and research functions at other New Zealand government agencies, such as the Ministry of Social Development, the Families Commission, the Department of Internal Affairs, and the State Services Commission.

Cribb also held appointment as the Deputy Children's Commissioner and led the Children's Commissioner's Expert Advisory Group on Solutions to Child Poverty.

Cribb's book, Being Accountable: Voluntary Organisations, Government Agencies and Contracted Social Services in New Zealand (2007) analyzes the way that people in the voluntary sector view accountability to the government and nonprofit service providers.

As of 2025, she is a professional director and consultant. She has a vineyard in Martinborough, and is a director of the New Zealand Wine Growers board. She chairs the Wellington Homeless Women’s Trust, and helped form the Coalition to End Women’s Homelessness. She is a co-founder Mind The Gap, an organisation promoting pay equity.

== Honours ==
- Westpac Leadership Fellowship 2014
- Finalist, New Zealand Woman of Influence Awards 2015
- Finalist, New Zealand Woman of Influence Awards 2016
- Winner, Not-for-Profit Governance Leader, Women in Governance Awards 2021

== Publications ==
- Cribb, Jo, and Rachel Petero. 2020. Take Your Space : Successful Women Share Their Secrets. Auckland: Onetree House Ltd.
- Cribb, Jo, and David Glover. 2018. Don’t Worry about the Robots : How to Survive and Thrive in the New World of Work. Auckland, New Zealand: Allen & Unwin.
- ‌Cribb, Jo, and Victoria University. 2006. Being Accountable : Voluntary Organisations, Government Agencies and Contracted Social Services in New Zealand. Wellington N.Z.: Institute Of Policy Studies.

== External sources ==
- Profile on the Institute of Directors website
