= Yahoo Australia =

Subsidiary of Yahoo!

Coordinates: 33.855927°S 151.203625°E

Yahoo! Australia
- Former name: Yahoo7 (2006–2018)
- Website type: Internet portal
- Owner: Yahoo
- Website: au.yahoo.com
- Commercial: Yes
- Registration: Optional
- Launched: 1 September 1997 (as Yahoo! Australia)
- Current status: Active

Yahoo! Australia (formerly Yahoo7 between 2006 and 2018) is the Australian subsidiary of global internet company Yahoo! Originally a 50/50 joint venture between Yahoo! and Seven West Media, it became a 100% subsidiary of Oath in March 2018. Yahoo! is a web portal, providing email, online news and lifestyle content, as well as weather, travel and retail comparison services.

== History ==
=== Origins ===
Yahoo!'s services originally came to Australia in 1997 with Yahoo! Australia launching on 1 September that year.

Seven Media Group founded i7 in September 2000 as their online service. In October 2001, Seven partnered with internet service provider AOL and established a joint venture called AOL7 in an attempt to boost the i7 platform. However, the partnership was unsuccessful with AOL reporting its biggest quarterly loss in U.S. history in April 2002, and Seven and AOL later selling the venture to Primus Telecommunications in February 2004. i7 was replaced by Seven's new website, seven.com.au, soon afterwards.

=== Yahoo7 ===
Yahoo7 was founded in January 2006 as a cross-media entity which would expand the content distribution networks of both internet-centric Yahoo and broadcast corporation Seven Media Group (now Seven West Media). Yahoo7's logo incorporates Yahoo! branding with Seven West Media's red "7". Yahoo7 replaced Yahoo!'s Australian and New Zealand websites which had been in operation since September 1997, taking on the majority of Seven's online operations in the process. Ryan Stokes, current chairman of Seven's Pacific Magazines division, said in a media release that the Yahoo7 entity would provide a "leading platform to engage the online audiences with the best global products and locally relevant media content for their connected lives".

In December 2006, Yahoo7 expanded its presence in New Zealand by partnering with Telecom New Zealand to establish Yahoo!Xtra. The venture was rebranded as Yahoo! New Zealand in April 2011 after Telecom sold its 49% share back to Yahoo7.

In recent years, Yahoo7 has made a series of high-profile online acquisitions to supplement its core search and marketing businesses. The company purchased Australian sports tipping site OzTips in mid-2010 and acquired Australian group buying site Spreets for $40m in early 2011. Spreets saw its membership increase by 140 per cent to 1.18m since the acquisition.

=== Yahoo! Australia ===
In March 2018, Seven West Media sold its 50% stake in Yahoo7 to Oath. This is despite earlier reports where Oath would sell their stake. By this time, Seven was in the process of uncoupling its services from Yahoo7, through the establishment of 7plus replacing Plus 7, 7NEWS.com.au becoming the home for Seven News, and their travel website: 7Travel.

== Products and services ==
=== Online content ===
Yahoo! derives its content from a variety of news and online media sites, as well as third-party content. The company runs a number of online sections which collate and augment content from various media outlets. Yahoo! also publishes an increasing volume of online-only content particularly lifestyle journalism and rich media published through the lifestyle section.

=== Plus7 ===
In January 2010, Yahoo! launched 7plus, an online catch-up portal for viewers to stream select TV shows with locked commercials and Seven News updates for a limited period of time after airing. The free service allowed users to watch a range of video content on demand, full length episodes from Channel Seven, 7mate and other content partners.

=== Web ===
Yahoo! also hosts a localised version of its Yahoo! communication and search as well as other vertical search services such as Yahoo Answers.

== Logo ==
Logo used from 2006 to 2014

Logo used from 2014 to 2018

Logo used from 2018 to 2019

From its creation in 2006 until late 2014, Yahoo7 used a logo identical to the common red logo of the time, with the addition of the Seven Network logo and an identical red colouring. This logo was replaced with the updated Yahoo! logo introduced to the United States in 2013, but included the Seven Network logo.
