= Women in Governance Awards =

New Zealand awards list for women

The Women in Governance Awards are an annual set of awards which recognise commitment to diversity by both organisations and individuals in New Zealand. The awards are administered by Governance New Zealand and have been awarded every year since 2016. In 2022 the awards were presented on 4 August at an event at Parliament in Wellington, by Minister for Women, Hon Jan Tinetti. In 2021 the awards were presented on 10 June at an event at the Hilton Auckland, by Ministers Hon Jan Tinetti, Hon Willie Jackson and Hon Aupito William Sio.

== Recipients ==
Year	Category	Recipient	Notes
2022	Gender Diverse Organisation of the Year	WE Accounting	
2022	Not-for-Profit Governance Leader	Mele Wendt	
2022	Māori Governance Leader	Tania Simpson	
2022	Pacific Governance Leader	Meleane Burgess	
2022	Rising Governance Star	Meleane Burgess	
2022	Ethnic Communities Governance Leader	Nuwanthie Samarakone	
2022	Lifetime Achievement Award	Sally Morrison	
2022	Gender Champion	Elle Archer and Susan Doughty	

Year	Category	Recipient	Notes
2021	Gender Diverse Organisation of the Year	Ruralco	
2021	Gender Diverse Organisation of the Year highly commended	Thankyou Payroll	
2021	Not-for-Profit Governance Leader	Jo Cribb	
2021	Not-for-Profit Governance Leader highly commended	Salome Nduta	
2021	Māori Governance Leader	Evelyn Taumaunu	
2021	Pacific Governance Leader	Caren Rangi	
2021	Emerging Governance Leader	Sina Cotter-Tait	
2021	Inspiring Governance Leader	Jessie Chan	

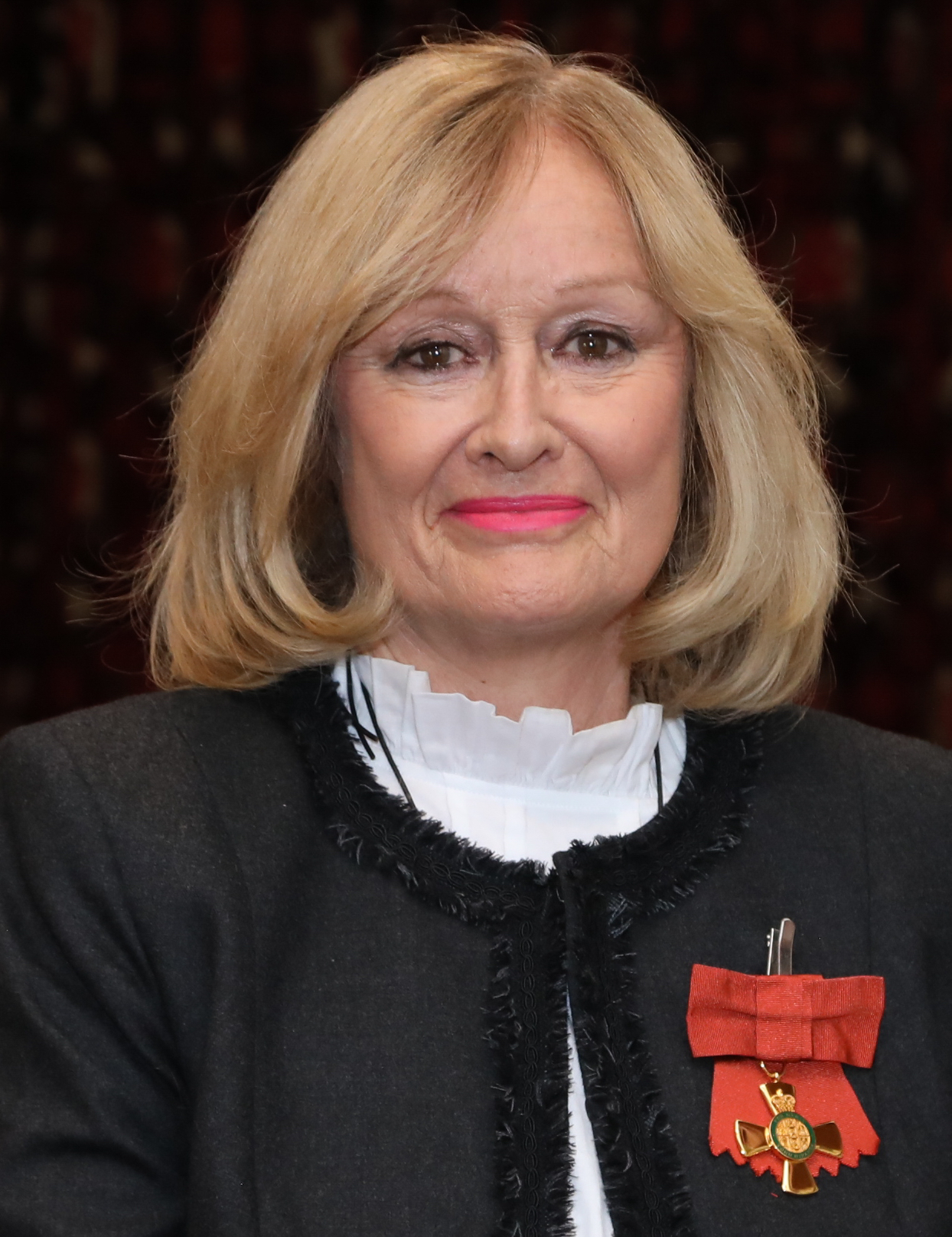
Sue Kedgley, winner of the 2019 Not-for-Profit Governance Leader Award

Year	Category	Recipient	Notes
2019	Gender Diverse Organisation of the Year	Saunders Robinson Brown Law	
2019	Not-for-Profit Governance Leader	Sue Kedgley, Wellington politician	
2019	Māori or Pasifika Governance Leader	Melanie Taite, Tuahiwi School principal	
2019	Emerging Governance Leader	Chelsea Grootveld	
2019	Inspiring Governance Leader	Justine Smyth	

Year	Category	Recipient	Notes
2018	Outstanding Pathway to Governance Leadership	YWCA Hamilton	
2018	Governance Innovation by a Not-for-Profit	Auckland Foundation	
2018	Women in Governance Organisation of the Year	Sport Wellington	
2018	Gender Advocacy Champion	Liz Dawson	
2018	Excellence in Governance	Phillipa Muir	
2018	Emerging Leader	Rebecca Annan and Claire Evans	
2018	Inspirational Excellence	Cassandra Crowley	

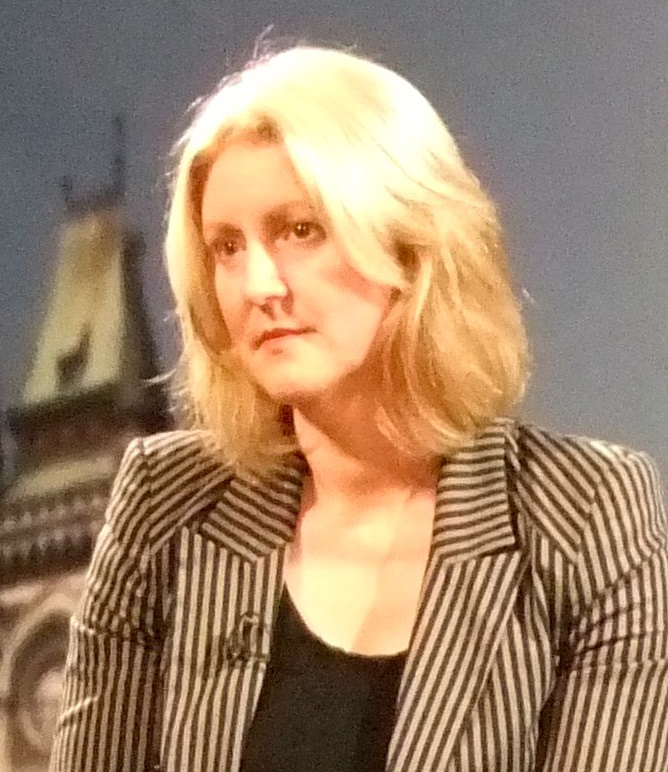
Heather Roy, winner of the Inspirational Excellence award in 2017

Year	Category	Recipient	Notes
2017	Outstanding Pathway to Governance Leadership	Agri-Women's Development Trust	
2017	Governance Innovation by a Not-for-Profit	Sport Wellington	
2017	Women in Governance Organisation of the Year	Auckland Community Law Centre	
2017	Gender Advocacy Champion	Linda Robertson	
2017	Excellence in Governance Development	Kate Reid	
2017	Emerging Leader	Sara Jane Elika, barrister and solicitor	
2017	Inspirational Excellence	Heather Roy, chair of Medicines NZ, Utilities Disputes Ltd and the Advertising Standards Authority	

Year	Category	Recipient	Notes
2016	Gender Diversity in Leadership	Ports of Auckland	
2016	Not-for-Profit Gender Diversity	Connexis	
2016	Excellence in Governance - Gender Diverse Organisation of the Year	Organic Initiative Ltd	
2016	Inclusive Leader - Gender Champion	Frances Hague	
2016	Excellence in Governance Development	Bev Edlin	
2016	Sport New Zealand Next Generation Leadership	Angela Lim	
2016	Supreme Award in Governance	Judy McGregor	

== See also ==
- List of awards honoring women
