= Justine Smyth =

New Zealand business executive and director

Justine Smyth CNZM
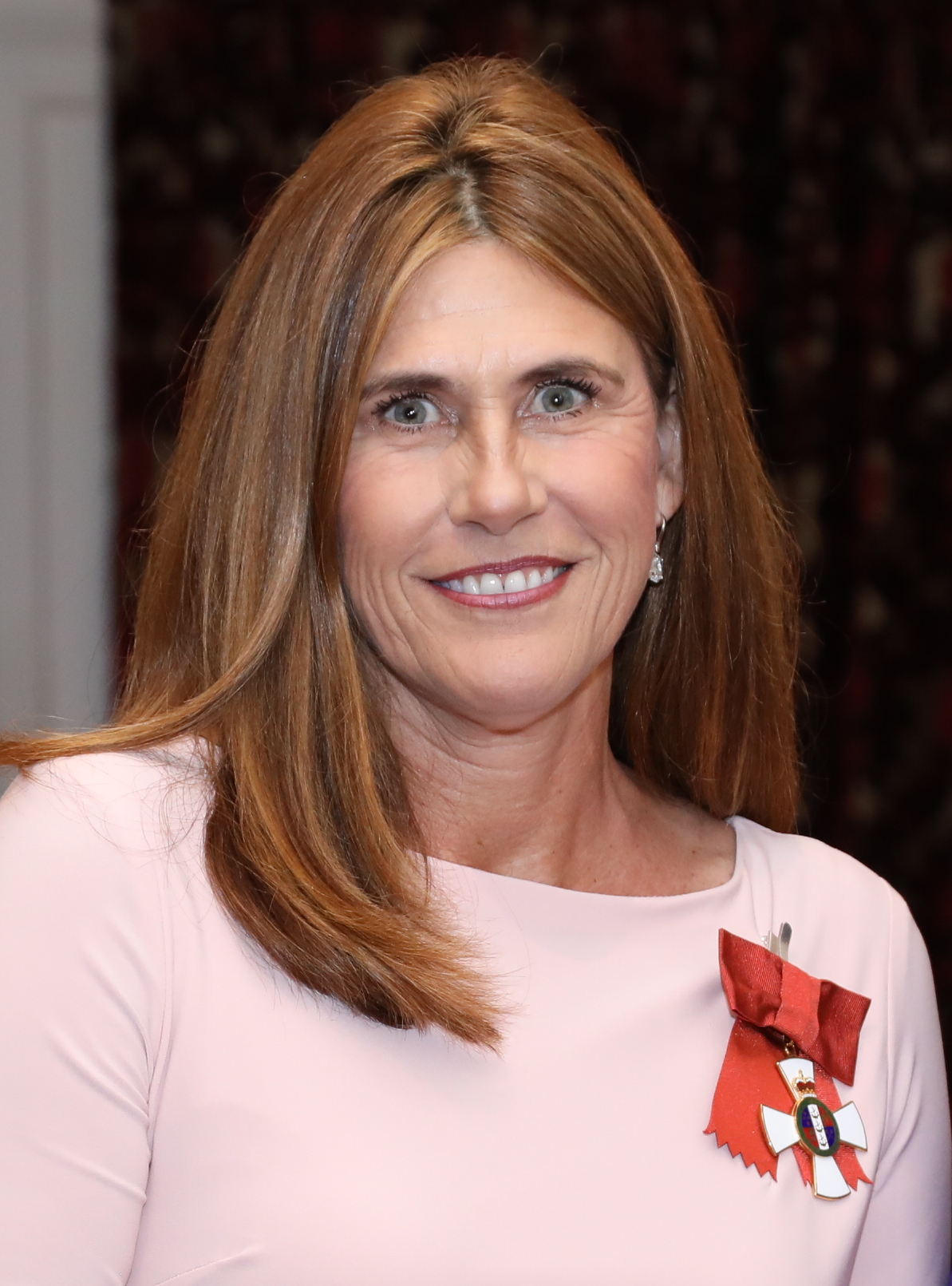
- Education: Papatoetoe High School, University of Auckland, Harvard Business School
- Awards: Companion of the New Zealand Order of Merit

Justine Gay Bronwyn Smyth CNZM is a New Zealand business executive, and professional director. In 2020, Smyth was appointed a Companion of the New Zealand Order of Merit, for services to governance and women.

== Early life and education ==
Smyth grew up in South Auckland. Her father was a farmer, and she is the fourth of six children. Smyth attended Papatoetoe High School, and earned a Bachelor of Commerce degree at the University of Auckland.

== Career ==
Smyth had received a bursary from the Inland Revenue Department which bonded her to work for them for three years. She then joined Deloitte, attaining the rank of partner at the age of 29 or 30, one of two female partners at the time. She also worked for Lion Nathan as Group Finance Director. She has been a director of New Zealand Post, Auckland International Airport, Mondiale VGL and Spark New Zealand. In 2017 she became the first woman to chair Spark's board. Smyth mentors other women to become senior leaders and directors, and was instrumental in setting gender diversity targets for boards and leadership teams.

Smyth has been Chair of the Breast Cancer Foundation since 2010. She was inspired to become involved due to her mother's survival after a diagnosis of breast cancer. Smyth was instrumental in establishing a mobile clinic to provide breast care services to small towns, the Pink Caravan project. She also helped the Foundation to set a vision of zero deaths from breast cancer, and oversaw the expansion of research funding to New Zealand breast cancer researchers.

== Personal life ==
Smyth is married and has one child. Smyth and her husband have owned infrastructure and lingerie businesses.

== Honours and awards ==
In 2019 Smyth won the Inspiring Governance Leader category at the Women in Governance Awards. In the 2020 Queen's Birthday Honours, Smyth was appointed a Companion of the New Zealand Order of Merit, for services to governance and women.
