= First TV =

First TV was the name of a cable television network that was operated in New Zealand's two main North Island cities, Auckland and Wellington by Telecom New Zealand in the 1990s.

== Trial stage ==
First Media was an owned subsidiary of Telecom NZ. First Media ran the two Cable operations in Auckland and Wellington which traded as First Television. First Media was started as a trial of cable television by Telecom in 1995. The trial, which operated in association with SKY Network Television offered 600 households in Auckland the three national broadcast channels that were operating, Action TV, three of Sky's subscription channels and six other channels. Considered a success the trial was extended and later expanded to include cable rollout in Wellington.

== Commercial success ==
As part of plans to turn the trial into a commercial operation First Media had planned to lay cable past 140,000 homes by June 1998; however in November 1996 with only 80,000 homes past Telecom announced a halt to the rollout. Telecom decided to focus on utilising its existing network of UTP copper cable. On June 5, with a pilot ADSL trial operational, Telecom announced First Media was to be shut down on July 31. Cable subscribers were disconnected and offered a refund on installation costs while DSL subscribers continue to receive Internet services only.

First Media provided traditional channels as well as a pay-per-view service that allowed subscribers to purchase movies as they wish to view them. First Media also offered the ability to view other channels on a per day basis and operated a music video channel called "The Cube" that allowed subscribers to request songs.
