= Simon Moutter =

New Zealand engineer and businessman

- Occupations: Ex Managing Director, Spark New Zealand

Simon Paul Moutter is a New Zealand engineer and businessman, and was Managing Director of Spark New Zealand from 1 September 2012 to 30 June 2019. He is currently appointed as a non-exec Director for the Commonwealth Bank of Australia

== Early life ==
Moutter grew up in Palmerston North, New Zealand, He attended Highbury School, Monrad Intermediate and Palmerston North Boys High. He has a BSc Bachelor of Science (Physics) from Massey University, a BE (Hons) Bachelor of Engineering with Honours (Electrical and Electronics) from the University of Canterbury, and a ME Master of Engineering (Electrical and Electronics) also from the University of Canterbury.

== Career ==
- 1983–1987: Electrical Engineer, New Plymouth Power Station, Electricity Division, NZ Ministry of Energy
- 1987–1990: MD and Founder of Electrotech Consultants Ltd, New Plymouth
- 1991–1992: Station Manager, New Plymouth Power Station, Electricorp Production
- 1992–1999: Chief Executive, Powerco
- 1999–2000: General Manager Network Delivery, Telecom New Zealand
- 2000–2002: Group General Manager Network & International, Telecom NZ
- 2002–2006: Chief Operating Officer, Telecom NZ
- 2006–2008: Chief Operating Officer (Business), Telecom NZ
- 2008–2012: CEO, Auckland Airport
- 2009–2012: member of the New Zealand Racing Board
- 2012–2019: CEO and Managing Director of Spark NZ
- 2019–present: Operating Partner to Private equity firms in NZ and Australia
- 2020-present: Non-executive, independent Director of Commonwealth Bank of Australia

=== Awards ===
- 1986 IPENZ Fulton-Downer Gold Medal
- 1989 IPENZ Evan Parry Award
- 2017 Deloitte Top200 NZ CEO of the Year
