= Spark New Zealand =

Telecommunications company in New Zealand

Spark New Zealand Limited
- Formerly: Telecom New Zealand
- Type: Public
- Traded as: NZX: SPK; ASX: SPK
- Industry: Telecommunications
- Predecessor: New Zealand Post Office
- Founded: 1 April 1987; 39 years ago
- Headquarters: Auckland, New Zealand
- Area served: New Zealand
- Key people: Justine Smyth, Chair; Jolie Hodson, Chief Executive; Stefan Knight, Finance Director; Grant McBeath, Customer Director; Mark Beder, Technology Director; Matt Bain, Marketing Director; Heather Polglase, HR Director; Melissa Anastasiou, General Counsel; Tessa Tierney, Product Director
- Services: Fixed telephony; Mobile telephony; Internet access; Leased lines; Data transmission; ICT services; Streaming video on demand; Home automation
- Revenue: ▼NZ$3,861,000,000 (2024)
- Operating income: ▼NZ$1,163,000,000 (2024)
- Net income: ▼NZ$316,000,000 (2024)
- Total assets: NZ$1,070,000,000 (2024)
- Total equity: NZ$1,590,000,000 (2024)
- Number of employees: 5,291 (2024)
- Divisions: Spark Home, Mobile and Business; Spark Wholesale; Spark Digital; Spark Ventures; Spark Connect; Spark Foundation; Skinny Mobile
- Website: spark.co.nz

Spark New Zealand Limited is a New Zealand telecommunications and digital services company providing fixed-line telephone services, mobile phone services, broadband, and digital technology services (including cloud, security, digital transformation, and managed services). Its customers range from consumers to small - medium business, government agencies and large enterprise clients. It was formerly known as Telecom New Zealand until it was rebranded to Spark on 8 August 2014. It has operated as a publicly traded company since 1990. Spark's mobile network reaches 98% of New Zealand, with over 2.7 million mobile connections and 687,000 broadband connections

Spark is one of the larger companies by value on the New Zealand Exchange (NZX), ranked at 14th behind Chorus in April 2026. The company is a member of New Zealand Telecommunications Forum.

Telecom New Zealand was formed in 1987 from a division of the New Zealand Post Office, and privatised in 1990. In 2008, Telecom was operationally separated into three divisions under local loop unbundling initiatives by central government – Telecom Retail; Telecom Wholesale; and Chorus, the network infrastructure division. This separation effectively ended any remnants of monopoly that Telecom Retail once had in the market. In 2011 the demerger process was complete, with Telecom and Chorus becoming separate listed companies.

Spark has 63 retail locations around New Zealand, including 16 in Auckland.

== History ==
The Postal Services Act 1987 split the then New Zealand Post Office into New Zealand Post Limited (trading as NZPost), Telecom Corporation of New Zealand Limited (trading as Telecom) and Post Office Bank Limited (trading as PostBank, sold to ANZ in 1989) and all three industries progressively deregulated. The selling price of Telecom was considered by some to be extremely low, given that Telecom had a monopoly of all phone lines in New Zealand at the time.

=== 1990s ===
In 1990, Telecom was sold to two United States–based telecommunications companies, Verizon Communications (formerly Bell Atlantic) and Ameritech, for NZ$4.25 billion. After Telecom was privatized, the Kiwi Share agreement was drawn up, which included a provision that the company retained free local calling for residential customers.

In 1991, Telecom listed on the New Zealand, Australian and New York stock exchanges. The following year Telecom implemented a NZ$200 million fibre-optic cable connection between Australia and New Zealand. Also in 1991, Roderick Deane was appointed CEO of the company. Then in 1993 Ameritech and Bell Atlantic reduced their share in Telecom to a combined 49.6% and BellSouth New Zealand Limited (BellSouth), subsequently acquired by Vodafone, set up the first mobile network to compete with Telecom.

Clear Communications reached an agreement with Telecom in 1995 on local service interconnection. Also in 1995, Telecom created First Media Ltd to develop a cable television network across Auckland and Wellington, called First TV. In 1996 Telecom established a telephone exchange in the United States for international traffic, and launched Xtra.

1997 saw Telecom buy back NZ$1 billion of its shares. The following year, Ameritech sold down its 24.8% shareholding in an international public offering, and Bell Atlantic issued exchangeable notes that were convertible into the Telecom shares that it owned.

In December 1997 Patricia Reddy was appointed to the Telecom board. She remained on it until 2008. In September 2016 as Dame Patsy Reddy she became the Governor General of New Zealand.

In 1998, Southern Cross Cables Limited (half owned by Telecom) announced plans to build a fibre-optic cable linking New Zealand with Australia and North America. Vodafone Group bought BellSouth and started a campaign to attract Telecom customers to its network.

In 1999, Telecom established a presence in Australia, buying 78% of AAPT, Australia's third-largest telecommunications company. Telecom upgraded its nationwide payphone network to smart card technology. Telecom's broadband Internet service based on ADSL technology, called JetStream, was launched and rolled-out progressively in local exchanges. Also at this time, Telecom began charging customers who connected to the Internet using a local dial up number, forcing all ISPs in New Zealand to change to an 0867 dial up number. This resulted in complaints that this was in breach of Telecom's Kiwishare Agreement where residential customers are allowed free local calling. The decade was rounded off with Theresa Gattung being appointed new CEO of Telecom, with Rod Deane moving to the position of chairman.

=== 2000s ===
The original Telecom logo

In 2000, Xtra signed up its 300,000th customer. Telecom also raised its shareholding in AAPT to 100%.

Evidence emerged in early 2002 of Telecom having exploited an ill-considered, or fraudulently made to order, accounting standard (FRS38) to inflate its year 2001 reported profit by some $263 million. This standard required holding companies to incorporate profits and losses of associate companies into their group accounts by way of "equity accounting" except when the associate is insolvent. Being insolvent has been wrongly taken as substantial evidence that the holding company will no longer share in the associates profits and losses. The associate company Southern Cross Cables paid Telecom $263 million in dividends as per (note 2 of) Telecom's 2001 annual accounts, $US200m as per Southern Cross's annual accounts.

Southern Cross opened for (limited) business in November 2000 and its income from operations to 30 June 2001 was only $US13 million ($US55 million for the 2002 year). Southern Cross were insolvent to the extent of $US24 million as at 30 June 2000 and this increased to $US280 million as at June 2001 as a result of the dividends and other (net) expenses ($328 million in 2002). The dividends were treated as income in Telecom's accounts there being nothing in FRS 28 to say that they should not be although such inclusion did breach an overall requirement that the accounts present a fair view.

In 2003, a new logo was launched costing $140,000.

In 2004, Telecom purchased Gen-i Ltd (in May) and Computerland Ltd (in September). The company had 36 retail stores around the country. During the year, the company won the Roger Award for the Worst Transnational Corporation operating in New Zealand.

In 2005, Telecom introduced "Bitstream", a 256 kbit ADSL service sold at wholesale prices (at approximately 10% below the retail price) to other ISPs. Telecom also posted a profit of NZ$916 million. The company also launched online retail store Ferrit launches with about 150 retailers.

2006

- 9 May: An audio clip recorded on 2 March was released involving Telecom CEO Theresa Gattung admitting the use of confusion as a chief marketing tool in the industry. The March recording also dismissed the New Zealand Government as "too smart to do anything dumb" with regards to regulation.
- Late May: Deane resigned as chairman, and was replaced by Wayne Boyd the following month.
- July: Matt Crockett was appointed CEO of Telecom's newly formed Wholesale division.
- All Computerland branches around New Zealand were rebranded as Gen-i.

2007

- 16 January: The Librarians Association of New Zealand put in a complaint about a Telecom advertisement where three young school children said, "Only dumb kids read books, brainy kids have broadband." Originally Telecom said it was the view of the young children and not Telecom and the advertisement was unscripted, later Telecom chose to edit the advertisement to remove the comments.
- 19 January: It was reported that Paritai Drive, Ōrākei, one of the richest streets in Auckland, was still not capable of receiving a broadband SL service and there were many other well populated areas around New Zealand still not capable of receiving broadband. Opposition Woosh Wireless immediately tested its service in the area and gave residents the opportunity to join its wireless broadband service.
- 5 February: Telecom announced that from March 2007 it would begin rolling out ADSL2+, more than a year after the original roll out date.
- 31 March: Telecom shut down its old 025 D-AMPS/TDMA network with all 025 phones changed to 027 (CDMA).
- May 2007: British Telecom had been in discussion with the New Zealand government regarding Telecom's monopoly control of the NZ broadband network. Three to four years previously, British Telecom was in a similar position to that of NZ Telecom; the British broadband network has since been broken up and the NZ government was keen to learn and possibly copy the development/regulatory/investment model used by the British firm.
- The Auckland Chamber of Commerce publicly stated that if Telecom did not invest in a next-generation high-speed network, comparable with that of other Western nations, they would fund a private fibre-optic based service in the 100 megabit speed range. The proposed coverage of this would be within 200m of a path running south from Auckland CBD (situated to allow as many businesses as possible to connect). Any company or private individual within this range would be offered a connection.
- 28 June: Telecom announced that Paul Reynolds, CEO of BT Wholesale, has been selected as the new CEO, to start on 27 September. Simon Moutter was appointed as acting CEO in the interim.
- 30 June: Theresa Gattung steps down as CEO, with a reported leaving payment of $5.125 million.
- 27 September: Dr Paul Reynolds starts as CEO of Telecom.
- In November 2007, the Boost Mobile brand was discontinued in New Zealand by Telecom.
- 21 November: Mark Ratcliffe, Chief Operating Officer for Technology, is appointed CEO of Telecom's soon-to-be spun off network division.

2008

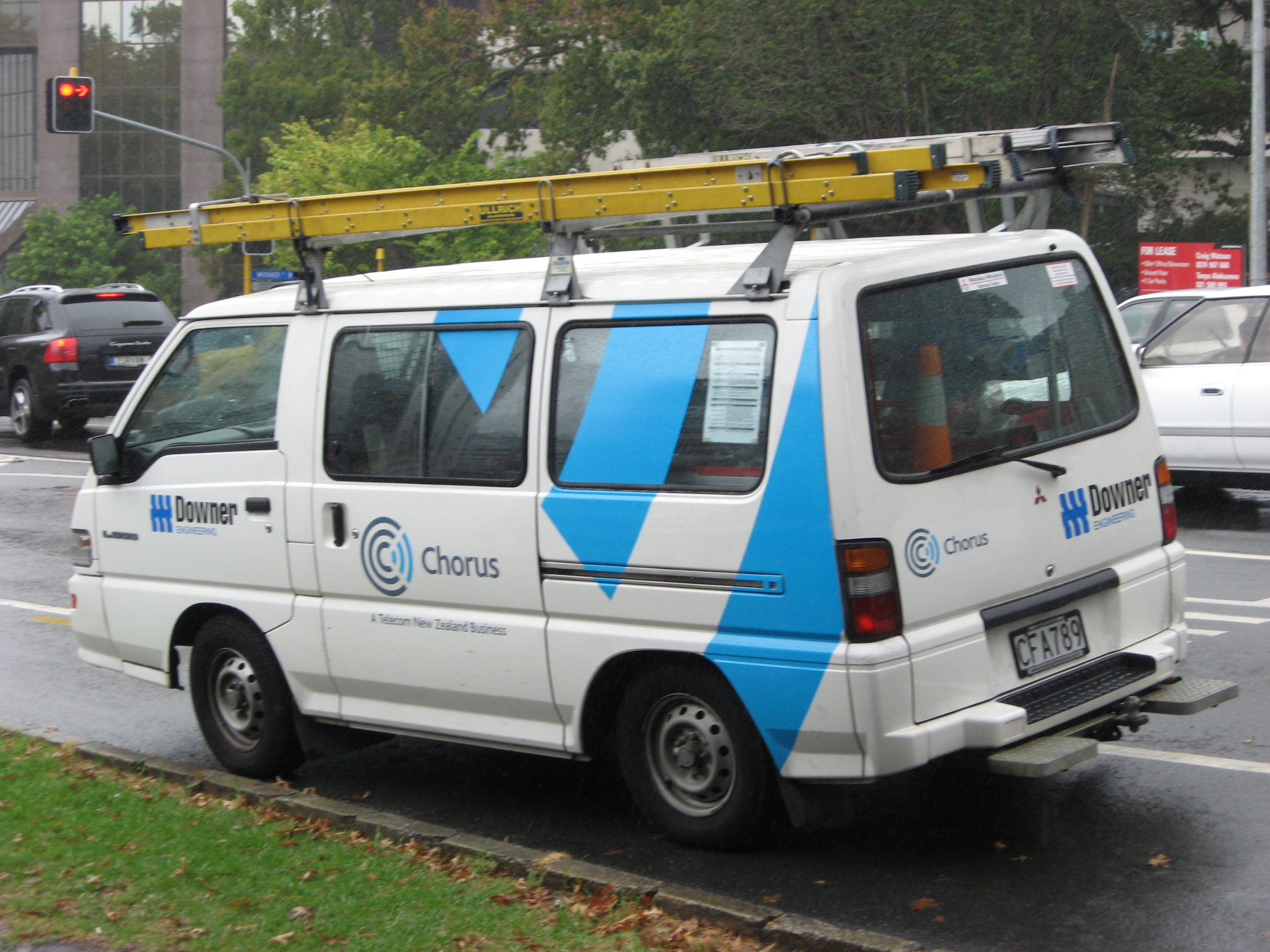
A van with the Chorus livery.

- 16 January: Telecom announces the formation of Chorus, its new network infrastructure division.
- 31 March: Telecom officially separates into three divisions (Chorus, Telecom Wholesale, Telecom Retail)
- 1 April: Russ Houlden, a colleague of Reynolds at BT, is appointed Chief Financial Officer. He replaces Marko Bogoievski, who joined Infratil.

2009

- 12 January: Telecom announces the closure of its online retail store Ferrit.
- August: An industrial dispute emerged between Chorus and the Engineering, Printing and Manufacturing Union after servicing contracts in the Auckland and Northland regions are awarded to Australian company Visionstream, which planned to change technicians' employment contracts to a dependent contractor model.

In October a new logo was announced.

=== 2010s ===
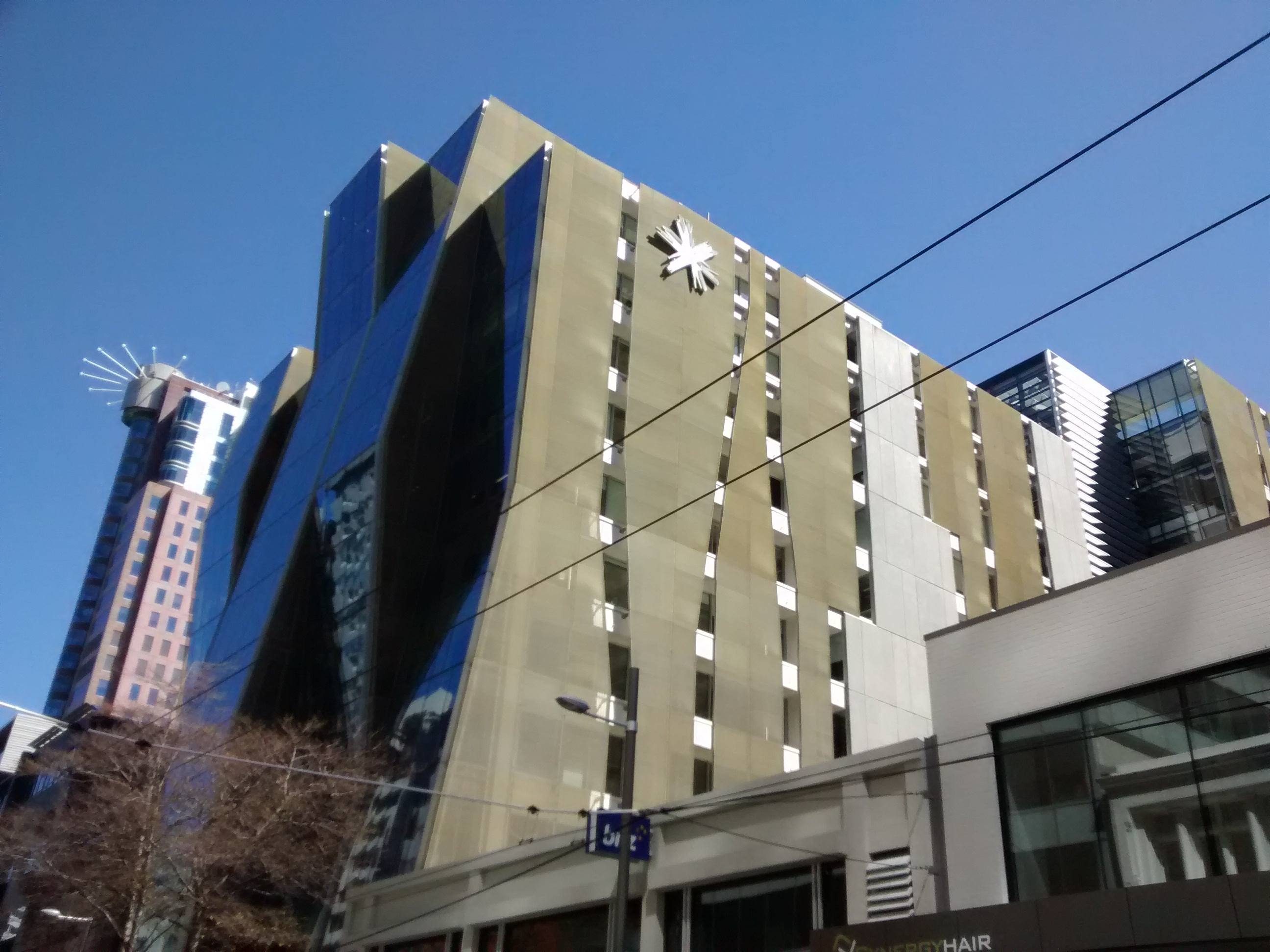
Spark's headquarters in Wellington

2010

- November: Telecom moves into its newly built world HQ on Victoria St in the Auckland CBD. Costing the developer $280 million, it will consist of 2700 staff and be the largest corporate move in New Zealand history.

2011

- 24 May: Crown Fibre Holdings announced that Telecom had been successful in partnering with the Government to build a fibre network.
- 9 June: The National Business Review reveals that in OIA documents that the Department of Internal Affairs considered at least one text message sent by Telecom to be in breach of the Unsolicited Electronic Messages Act 2007.
- 1 December: Telecom divests itself of Chorus, the Network Infrastructure division, in a one for five share deal, with Chorus becoming a separately listed company.

2013

- 9 December: Telecom announces sale of AAPT for A$450 million

2014

- 21 February: Telecom announces a name change to 'Spark', which took effect on 8 August 2014 to better reflect the company's new direction and aspirations.
- 25 June 2014: Spark announce Lightbox, an online movie and TV show streaming service, in competition with Netflix and SkyTV. Lightbox went live on 27 August 2014.
- 8 August: Telecom rebrands as Spark. Individual subsidiaries of the company are rebranded to reflect the name change such as Telecom Mobile becomes Spark Mobile, Telecom Foundation becomes Spark Foundation, Gen-i is rebranded as Spark Digital. The company kept the existing Star shaped logo with each division using a different colour for the logo such as silver for Spark New Zealand, orange or pink for Spark Home & Mobile stores, green for Spark Business and purple for Spark Digital.
- 5–7 September: Spark experiences nationwide outages due to a denial of service attack, which was believed to have largely originated from malware that installed itself onto customers' computers when they clicked on malicious links to celebrity photos leaked in August.

2015

- 12 August: Spark released a new cloud based consumer service called Morepork, which offers smart home based security services. This enabled consumers to purchase security hardware and services through a monthly subscription for home monitoring linked to their mobile phone.
- 7 December: Spark purchased a South Island–based IT services firm, Computer Concepts Ltd, for $50 million NZD.

2019

- 14 March: Spark launched its subscription based sports streaming service Spark Sport. The service would compete against Sky Sport (New Zealand) which at the time had a near monopoly on pay TV sports rights in New Zealand.
- 19 December: It was announced that Spark would be selling its Lightbox streaming service to the satellite television company Sky Television, which intends to merge Lightbox into its own online streaming service Neon in 2020. Following the merger, Spark will partner with Sky to make the service available to Spark customers through the telecommunication company's entertainment offers.

=== 2020s ===
2023

- 4 April: Spark announced that it would invest between NZ$250 million and NZ$300 million into building data centres over the next three years, and between NZ$40 million and NZ$60 million into its 5G business over the next three years.

2026

- 27 April: Spark restructures its organisation into two divisions: a Connectivity division responsible for core telephone and IT services, and a separate Digital Services division.

=== Mobile network ===
Logo of XT, a network launched by Spark (then Telecom) in 2009

Telecom started the first cellular network service using AMPS in 1987. This transitioned to D-AMPS TDMA digital services in the early 1990s. The service in the 800 MHz band gave great geographic coverage.

In 1996 Telecom introduced an innovative and first-to-market wireless data cellular network known as CDPD (Cellular Digital Packet Data) that provided IP connections with mobility. Introduced to the market by the product manager, David Beale, they succeeded in the very first IoT-device connections in the region connecting, amongst other things, Coke's vending machines, NZ Post's couriers and parcel tracking, and telemetry data from the Americas Cup yacht races in Auckland to feed a realtime TV graphics service.

In 2005, a phreaker exposed a vulnerability with the mobile network, allowing public access to almost anyone's voicemail; in response to concerns over privacy and security, this network issue was resolved.

On 31 March 2007, the 025 D-AMPS ("TDMA") cellular network was closed down. Then on 8 June of that year, Telecom Mobile announced plans to build a hybrid W-CDMA/UMTS-CDMA 850 MHz network, based on the WCDMA HSPA technology, to eventually replace its current CDMA EV-DO network. On 29 May 2009, Telecom launched its new network, branded as "XT", to the public.

The XT Network was a brand name for a UMTS and LTE mobile network run by Spark New Zealand (formerly Telecom New Zealand). On 27 April 2009, Telecom announced that the new XT network would launch on 13 May 2009 at 6:30pm.

In May 2009, Vodafone sued Telecom, accusing it of interfering with their network, using the same frequency bands as their existing 3G network. However, Telecom had said it is working with Vodafone to resolve the issues and was surprised by that company's decision to pursue legal action. A decision was made between the two companies to increase the filtering of the network, with neither company stating who was footing the bill.

After lengthy internal and corporate trials, a Vodafone New Zealand and Telecom dispute about network interference pushed the date to 29 May. The XT Network was launched to the public on 29 May 2009, at 7:30 am. The network was the successor to Telecom NZ's CDMA mobile network. With the shutdown of CDMA in 2012, XT is currently the company's sole mobile network.

The network was initially built nationwide on WCDMA/UMTS 850 MHz, with 2100 MHz infill in major urban areas. The UMTS network is HSPA+ enabled, with a maximum downlink transmission rate of 21.1 Mbit/s and an uplink rate of 5.2 Mbit/s attainable for capable hardware. HSPA+ has a theoretical maximum of 56 Mbit/s download speed and 22 Mbit/s upload speed. Then, under Spark, 4G LTE is being built out. The network is not 2G capable; Telecom never operated a public GSM network.

Before and immediately after launch the XT mobile network was promoted by three advertisements hosted by Richard Hammond, and following this was an advert featuring stuntwoman/actress Zoë Bell, advertising speed and roaming capabilities. Telecom claimed that the XT Network to be "Faster in more places" than any other mobile network in New Zealand, including competitor Vodafone and start-up 2degrees; these claims were backed by independent testing commissioned by Telecom. Advertising material at the time proclaimed the network to reach "97% of places Kiwis live and work". This claim was quietly removed in early 2010.

As of 2011 the meaning of "XT" remains unknown to the public, as even Telecom's website fails to address this anomaly. An independent news website featured a "Q&A" having questions submitted by the public and answers from Telecom representatives, and one of the questions asked addressed this: "What time on friday will the network launch? What does XT stand for? XTra? tXT? eXTraordinary? Xtra Telecom?". The network's response only addressed the first part of the question: "The official XT Launch time is 07:30 29 May 2009."

The name "XT Network" is no longer used. It has been called: "XT Mobile Network", then "The Smartphone Network" under Telecom, and now "Spark Mobile" under Spark.

In December 2009 and February 2010, Telecom's new XT Mobile Network experienced high-profile failures for many customers in locations from Taupo south, due to a radio network controller failure in Christchurch. As a result of the loss of service Telecom offered a $5 million compensation package for its customers.

In April 2010, Telecom released its first Android handset on the XT Mobile Network, the LG GW620.

On 31 July 2012, the Telecom CDMA mobile network was closed down.

In September 2013, Telecom officially launched new Ultra Mobile branding and plans. These plans included a free 4G upgrade (4G was made available two months later in November 2013) with a 1GB of data per day from Telecom WiFi hotspots. In October 2013, Telecom sought clearance to acquire management rights for parts of the 700 MHz spectrum with the intention of developing of its 4G mobile network.

"The 4G LTE coverage was initially offered to subscribers in Auckland, Wellington and Christchurch starting 12 November 2013. Telecom estimates that half of its smartphone network will be able to offer 4G LTE by the end of 2014." The frequencies used for LTE are 1800 MHz (LTE Band 3), and 700 MHz was added once analogue TV frequencies were retired. The first 4G 700 MHz (LTE Band 28) cell sites came online in areas of rural Waikato in mid 2014. Spark also has 2600 MHz (LTE band 7), and 2300 MHz (LTE band 40) LTE, carrier aggregation is available, with a compatible handset band 3 (1800 MHz) and band 7, band 28 and band 40 can be used simultaneously to speed up data access (available in many sites across both rural, and urban NZ).

Spark New Zealand and fellow telecommunications companies 2degrees and One NZ planned to end their 2G and 3G by 31 December 2025. This 3G shutdown has now been completed.

=== Industry regulation and company restructuring ===
In 2000, the New Zealand Government conducted a comprehensive review of the regulatory regime in the telecommunications industry. Subsequently, in 2001 the Telecommunications Act was passed, which among other things established the role of a Telecommunications Commissioner.

In a decision by the Government on 3 May 2006, Telecom was forced to unbundle the local loop, to provide "access to fast, competitively priced broadband internet". The decision significantly affected the company's market share, and allowed competitors (such as TelstraClear, Orcon and ihug) to offer broadband and other communications services throughout New Zealand by installing their own equipment in exchanges. The announcement of this decision was rushed ahead of schedule, as the documents were leaked to Telecom who advised the government of the leak. It was widely reported that the government had intended to make the announcement during the 2006 Budget. Most of Telecom's competitors and many independent commentators such as InternetNZ and Paul Budde applauded the decision, with opposition to unbundling coming from the Business Roundtable, Federated Farmers, and Bruce Sheppard (representing Telecom shareholders). Legislation was introduced to enable the regulatory changes. Three other political parties (New Zealand First, the Green Party and United Future) supported the decision, which would give the government at least 66 votes if there were no votes against the party line. The main opposition National Party initially opposed the unbundling decision, but later voted in favour of it after a select committee hearing. This left the ACT Party alone in opposing the decision.

The company was then affected by a series of other government decisions. Firstly, in early-June 2006 the Commerce Commission ruled on the contentious issue of mobile telephone termination charges, announcing that calls between a landline and a mobile phone within a geographically defined boundary could be connected free of termination charges. This ruling allowed Vodafone New Zealand to establish a mobile phone product which could also provide free local calling. Then, the Commerce Commission granted two of Telecom's competitors, CallPlus and ihug, access to an unrestricted, Unbundled Bitstream Service, which would allow them to provide competitive broadband services.

On 27 June 2006, the company announced that it would voluntarily separate its business into two separate operating business units – Wholesale and Retail. The Government introduced the Telecommunications Amendment Bill in November 2006 to force Telecom to open its network to competitors. The bill officially split Telecom into three business units from 31 March 2008, with network access separated from the wholesale and retail units.

In January 2012 Telecom launched a new sub brand aimed at the youth market named Skinny Mobile.

On 28 March 2013, Telecom announced that it would reduce staff levels by constraint on recruitment activity and redundancies. This followed from speculation by MP Clare Curran that up to 1500 jobs would be cut from the company.

On 12 March 2018, Spark announced leadership changes as a move towards Agile.

On 27 July 2026, Spark announced a significant restructuring of its business splitting it into two divisions. One division for Connectivity, and the other for Digital Services. Spark's statement indicates a possible sale of business that no longer fits their strategic direction.

== Spark Broadband ==
Spark is New Zealand's largest internet service provider. It was formerly named Xtra. The next largest ISP in the New Zealand market is One NZ, a position it acquired when it purchased TelstraClear in 2012.

Spark offers asymmetric digital subscriber line (ADSL), very-high-bit-rate digital subscriber line (VDSL), fibre to the premises (FTTP)

== Spark Mobile ==
Spark NZ mobile is New Zealand's largest mobile operator by market-share. As of 2021, Spark NZ had 41% of the New Zealand market, ahead of competitor One NZ (then called Vodafone) who was at 38% share. Telecom's mobile network was once branded as "XT", and operated at 850 MHz nationwide (with some 2100 MHz overlay in urban areas), with 3G now being shut down.

Telecom originally operated a TDMA (AMPS, Digital D-AMPS/TDMA) mobile network; this was superseded by its CDMA network. The TDMA network was turned off on 31 March 2007, and most of its customers migrated to CDMA. The CDMA EV-DO network was marketed as T3G, a 2 MB third-generation mobile system. Telecom announced on 8 June 2007 the intention to build a W-CDMA/UMTS network, to be called XT Mobile Network, based on WCDMA HSPA technology, to replace its current CDMA EV-DO network. The network was launched on 29 May 2009. The CDMA network ran in parallel with XT until it was shut down on 31 July 2012.

The TDMA network used the 025 mobile prefix, using a mixture of six- and seven-digit subscriber numbers. With the switch to CDMA, Telecom migrated to the 027 prefix and standardised the subscriber numbers to seven digits, adding a 4 to the beginning of old six-digit numbers.

=== Customer numbers and market share ===
Spark competes with One NZ, 2degrees and mobile virtual network operators for mobile market share. In November 2015, Spark had 40% mobile market share.

One NZ which operates a GSM 900/1800 network since 1993, a WCDMA 2100 MHz network since 2005 and were also the first to launch a 4G LTE network in NZ. Vodafone, in response to Telecom's "Faster in More Places" claim, had constructed a nationwide WCDMA 900 MHz network in areas where they did not already have an existing 2100 MHz network. One NZ also operate a 5G network, using Band n78 in the 3.5GHz range.

2degrees launched their 4G LTE service in 2014, and 5G service in February 2022.

Spark, 2Degrees and One NZ all operate 4G networks in LTE band 3 and LTE band 28, with band 3 coverage mostly in cities and towns; band 28 available predominantly across rural towns, countryside, highways and coastal areas. Both Spark and One NZ have licences to provide LTE band 7 services, and One NZ also operates 4G in LTE band 1.

In 2024, it was estimated that Spark NZ held a 39% market share in New Zealand.

The following shows customer numbers and market share information for Telecom Mobile, covering both the now-shut-down TDMA and CDMA networks and Spark's GSM network up to 2015 only.

Quarter	No of customers	Market share %
December 1999	858,000	68.37%
December 2000	1,150,000	60.43%
December 2001	1,379,000	56.94%
December 2002	1,229,000	50.18%
December 2003	1,298,000	49.95%
November 2005	1,600,000	46%
March 2007	1,900,000	49%
February 2010	2,152,000	44.4%
August 2012	1,600,000	32.2%
November 2015	2,200,000	40%

As of April 2026, Spark claims that 4G now reaches almost 99% of the New Zealand population.

Date	Geographical Areas	LTE Band 3 (1800)	LTE Band 28 (700)	LTE Band 7 (2600)	LTE Band 40
late 2013	Auckland, Wellington, Christchurch	Yes			
2014	Auckland	Yes		Yes (central city)	
late 2014	Dunedin, Queenstown and Arrowtown, Te Anau, Wānaka, Greymouth Hanmer Springs, Kaikoura, Blenheim, Nelson and Richmond, Motueka	Yes	Yes		
late 2014	Cromwell, Tākaka		Yes		
mid 2014	Waikato rural: Thames, Waihi, Tauranga, Hamilton, Taupō, Cambridge, Te Awamutu, Morrinsville, Matamata, Huntly, Coromandel		Yes		
mid 2014	Rotorua, Taupō	Yes	Yes		
mid 2014	Ohakune, Masterton	Yes			
late 2014	Whitianga, Pauanui, Matarangi, Whakatane	Yes			
late 2014	Warkworth, Snells Beach, Bay of Islands	Yes			
late 2014	Whangārei		Yes		
ETA: Early 2022	Chatham Island, Pitt Island (through Rural Connectivity Group/RCG network)		Yes		

In 2017, Spark started a rollout for LTE Advanced also marketed as 4.5G, delivering speeds up to 1 Gbps. This feature is compatible with most higher-end smartphones and cellular tablets.

=== 5G network ===
Spark launched its 5G Wireless Broadband service on 26 September 2019, in Alexandra, Westport, Twizel, Tekapo, Hokitika and Clyde.

Spark launched its 5G Mobile service in July 2020. Spark 5G is N78 in the 3500 MHz range and is compatible with selected devices such as the Apple iPhone 12 series or Samsung Galaxy 5G series. As of November 2021; Spark 5G is still free for all customers.

Date	Geographical Areas	N78/3500MHZ – Mobile/Broadband	N38/2600MHZ – Broadband
September 2019	Alexandra, Westport, Twizel, Tekapo, Hokitika and Clyde		Yes
July 2020	Palmerston North	Yes	
October 2020	Auckland, Takapuna	Yes	
November 2020	Dunedin	Yes	
December 2020	New Plymouth, Te Awamutu	Yes	
March 2021	Christchurch CBD	Yes	
April 2021 – December 2021	Napier, Hastings, Hamilton, Alexandra	Yes	

In August 2021, Spark announced they will invest an additional $35 million to accelerate its 5G rollout – and aims to expand 5G coverage to 50% of the population by the end of 2022, and 90% of the population by the end of 2023. The accelerated rollout will introduce 5G to an additional 15 locations across New Zealand by the end of 22; including expanding and upgrading existing 5G cellular sites. The 5G upgrade plan will allow Spark to meet the growing demand for data, which grows by approximately 40% per year. 5G will also be utilised by Skinny (Spark's Virtual Operator) for Wireless Broadband; including subsidised Skinny Jump for low-income households; to deliver more capacity to more customers. As the 5G network is expanded and upgraded; 4G will also receive upgrades with an additional range of RCG towers to be deployed. As well as utilising the current N78 5G standard for urban areas; Spark plans to enable access to the 600MHZ band to allow further coverage. Spark's 5G rollout is dependant if the Radio Spectrum Management authorises their required frequencies.

Spark's 5G compatibility is limited to approved devices only, which also require VoLTE. Imported/incompatible devices are unlikely to connect to Spark 5G. Spark 5G Devices. This is not seen with One NZ, where 5G automatically provisions on almost any 5G-enabled device, whereas Spark only provisions on their selected devices.

== Spark Sport ==
Spark Sport
- Developer: Spark New Zealand
- Type: Streaming media
- Launched: 14 March 2019
- Discontinued: 30 June 2023
- Website: www.sparksport.co.nz

Spark Sport was a New Zealand sports streaming service, owned and operated by Spark. The service was launched on 14 March 2019 after Spark obtained the New Zealand broadcast rights to various World Rugby events including the 2019 Rugby World Cup a year earlier. During that time, Spark Sport obtained the rights to several other sports to build its catalog, until the streaming service was ready for launch, coverage was sublicienced to TVNZ to screen. Its first major live sport broadcast was the streaming of the 2019 Australian F1 Grand Prix.

There were concerns that Spark's broadcast of the Rugby World Cup would struggle under New Zealand's internet capabilities especially in rural communities and anticipated audience numbers streaming matches resulting in similar issues to Optus Sport's broadcasting FIFA World Cup 2018 in Australia. On the second day of the Rugby World Cup, Spark Sport suffered technical issues during its live stream of the match between New Zealand and South Africa leaving viewers unable to watch the game, as a result broadcast of the second half was simulcast of traditional television on TVNZ Duke as part of a contingency plan with free-to-air broadcaster TVNZ for issues during the Rugby World Cup. Viewers would continue to report issues throughout the tournament, despite the issues Spark responded noting that there were no issues from their end in the broadcast feed and that the issues experienced were due to the individual viewer's set up configuration of their streaming devices.

Following its broadcast of the 2019 Rugby World Cup, Spark Sport announced it had secured a six-year broadcast deal with New Zealand Cricket for all domestic and international cricket played within New Zealand. The rights had been previously held by Sky Sport for over 25 years. Spark Sport's coverage of cricket is presented by Scotty Stevenson, with regular analysts and commentators including Mark Richardson, Craig McMillan, Craig Cumming, Brendon McCullum, Grant Elliott, Stephen Fleming, Rebecca Rolls and Frances Mackay. American outside broadcast (OB) provider Gravity Media provided the equipment to cover Spark's coverage, brought over from Australia. This was due to the country's main OB company On Site Broadcasting being owned by Sky Television and had 'Sky Sport' livery on most of its OB trucks. UK's Whisper TV provided the overall production element. During the 2022/23 season NEP Group was given the outside broadcast contract, which, ironically, bought OSB from Sky in 2020 and all trucks rebranded with NEP livery.

Spark Sport was the host broadcaster for the 2021 Rugby World Cup held in New Zealand.

Spark had previously broadcast sport through its subscription video on-demand service Lightbox partnering with Coliseum Sports Media to deliver a subscription-based sports streaming service called Lightbox Sport streaming golf, English Premier League football and French Top 14 rugby.

In December 2022, Spark Sport announced that it would be shutting down in the second half of 2023 due to a combination of financial and technical problems. The remaining three years broadcasting rights for all New Zealand Cricket international and domestic games within New Zealand would go to TVNZ from 1 July 2023. The Formula 1 had moved to Sky TV and Sky Sport.

=== Previously held sports rights ===
Rugby union

- 2019 Men's Rugby World Cup
- 2021 Women's Rugby World Cup
- European Rugby Champions Cup
- United Rugby Championship
- Manu Samoa home games
- Ikale Tahi Tonga home games

Football

- 2020 UEFA Euro
- 2022 UEFA Women's Euro
- UEFA Nations League
- UEFA Champions League
- UEFA Europa League
- UEFA Europa Conference League
- UEFA Super Cup
- UEFA Women's Champions League
- 2021 Copa America
- 2022 Copa America Femenina
- Copa Libertadores
- Copa Sudamericana
- Recopa CONMEBOL
- CONMEBOL World Cup Qualifying
- Premier League
- Women's Super League
- FA Cup
- FA Community Shield
- EFL Cup
- Women's FA Cup

Cricket

- New Zealand Cricket
  - Home internationals
  - Men's Super Smash and Women's Super Smash
  - The Ford Trophy final
- England and Wales Cricket Board
  - Home internationals
  - The Hundred
  - Vitality Blast
  - Royal London One-Day Cup final
- Highlights from ICC events.

Motorsport

- Formula One + Junior Series (F2, F3)
- World Rally Championship + Other Series (WRC2, WRC3)
- MotoGP + Junior Series (Moto2, Moto3)
- DTM
- Porsche Supercup
- World Rallycross Championship
- EuroFormula Open Championship
- European Le Mans Series
- International GT Open
- Toyota Racing Series

Rugby league

- 2021 Men's Rugby League World Cup
- 2021 Women's Rugby League World Cup
- 2021 Wheelchair Rugby League World Cup
- 2021 Physical Disability Rugby League World Cup

Hockey

- Men's Pro League
- Women's Pro League

Tennis

- WTA Tour events excluding events played in New Zealand.

Other Sports

- Horse racing via TAB Trackside channels
- MLB
- NFL
- NBA via NBA TV
- UFC pay-per-view events

== Criticism ==
When Telecom held a general monopoly in New Zealand telecommunications, it was criticised for using its incumbent status to charge high prices. Prices have subsequently dropped as competition in the market has increased.

Competitors alleged that Telecom engaged in unfair practices to prevent them from gaining ground, for example by reselling broadband capacity to Xtra at lower prices than to other ISPs. In July 2005, two dozen Internet service providers formally complained to New Zealand's Commerce Commission via a letter. Notably absent from the list of signatories were Telecom's ISP, Xtra, and several ISPs owned by its main competitor, TelstraClear. On 1 February 2007 the Consumers' Institute gave its "supreme ass award" for bad products to Telecom for its Xtra broadband service, Consumers Institute executive director David Russell claimed that since Telecom "unleashed" its broadband speeds, the institute had been "inundated with complaints of slower speeds and frustrating cutouts". Telecom has been given the Roger Award more than once, in 2004 and 2007 – and only the second company awarded as such, with the defunct TranzRail being the first.

The New Zealand Treasury once estimated the economic loss from Telecom's (now former) monopoly to be in the region of $50–$250 million a year. Another study commissioned in 1998 by competitor Clear (later TelstraClear) estimated that the loss was $400 million a year. At a retail level Telecom now faces competition in all areas — cellular, internet, toll-calls and, subject to ongoing developments, in local calling. At a network level these retail services often resell Telecom wholesale products.

Telecom claimed one reason for poor broadband uptake in New Zealand was because of the fact New Zealand residential subscribers enjoy free local calling. Telecom stated "customers have the option of moving to faster broadband services, but free local calling creates a disincentive by allowing them to use dial-up for as long they want" (i.e. they do not have to pay a per-minute call charge while using dial-up, unlike many other countries where local calls are charged for). However, some experts and competitors disagreed – including the secretary of the OECD.

Telecom failed to reach their self-imposed goal of around 83,333 wholesale broadband customers by the end of 2005. During her opening address to parliament, Prime Minister Helen Clark criticised the state of the internet in New Zealand. This was followed by extensive criticism in the media such as in two high-profile television programmes, in two episodes of Campbell Live (whose past major sponsors include Telecom), during which CEO Theresa Gattung was challenged by host John Campbell, and an episode of the New Zealand edition of Sunday. Critical articles had been published by various magazines and newspapers, including the largest newspaper, The New Zealand Herald. Of significance, many of these were lengthy and high-profile articles compared to many previous articles critical of Telecom — among the most noticeable of these was published by the National Business Review, in which it was stated that "Far from being 'Xtraordinary', as its multimillion dollar advertising would have you believe, Telecom is strangling the nation's advancement." While in Wellington for an ICANN meeting, Vint Cerf was reported to have made a personal visit to David Cunliffe, the telecommunications minister where it is believed he recommended that Telecom be unbundled. The government investigated whether it needed to force Telecom to unbundle the network, thereby allowing other companies access and improving broadband service for consumers.

From 2007, Yahoo! provided Telecom's email service, which came under heavy criticism in early 2013 following a spam and phishing attack described as the biggest to have ever hit the country. Telecom and Yahoo! automatically reset tens of thousands of users' passwords. In April, Telecom announced that despite the issue, it would keep Yahoo! on as an email provider. Problems with Telecom's YahooXtra email continued into December 2013 and further into 2014 with the latest problems reported on 10 January. They later moved their mail service to SMX, a New Zealand-based provider, in May 2017.

Spark was officially prosecuted by the Commerce Commission in July 2018, with 11 criminal charges filed against the company in the Auckland District Court. Spark was later convicted and fined $675,000 in 2019.
