= UMTS channels =

The UMTS channels are communication channels used by third generation (3G) wireless Universal Mobile Telecommunications System (UMTS) networks. UMTS channels can be divided into three levels:

- Physical
- Transport
- Logical

== List ==
UMTS Channels
Level	sex	Full Name	Description	UL/DL	Ref
3_LOGICAL	BCCH	broadcast control channel	For broadcasting system control information	DL	5.3.1.1.1
3_LOGICAL	CCCH	common control channel	Supports common procedures required to establish a dedicated link between the UE and the network.	UL/DL	5.3.1.1.1
3_LOGICAL	CTCH	common traffic channel	A point-to-multipoint unidirectional channel for transfer of dedicated user information for all or a group of specified UEs.	DL	5.3.1.1.1
3_LOGICAL	DCCH	dedicated control channel	A point-to-point dedicated channel for transmitting control information between a UE and the network.	UL/DL	5.3.1.1.1
3_LOGICAL	DTCH	dedicated traffic channel	A point-to-point dedicated channel for transmitting user traffic information between a UE and the network.	UL/DL	5.3.1.1.1
3_LOGICAL	PCCH	paging control channel	Transfers paging information. Used when the network does not know the location cell of the UE or the UE is in sleep mode.	DL	5.3.1.1.1
2_TRANSPORT	BCH	broadcast channel	Used to broadcast cell and system information.	DL	4.1.2.1
2_TRANSPORT	CPCH	common packet channel	Used for transmission of bursty data traffic. Shared by the UEs in a cell. Employs fast power control. NOTE - removed after R5.	UL	4.1.2.5
2_TRANSPORT	DCH	dedicated channel	Allocated to an individual user and typically used to support a speech channel.	UL/DL	4.1.1.1
2_TRANSPORT	DSCH	downlink shared channel	Carries dedicated user data or control information. May be shared by several UEs. Associated with a downlink DCH. NOTE - removed after R5.	DL	4.1.2.6
2_TRANSPORT	E-DCH	enhanced dedicated channel	HSUPA Enhanced (high-speed) dedicated uplink transport channel.	UL	4.1.1.2
2_TRANSPORT	FACH	forward access channel	Carries control information to UEs in a cell (may also be used to transmit packet data). Makes up the RACH/FACH pair.	DL	4.1.2.2
2_TRANSPORT	HS-DSCH	high speed downlink shared channel	The HSDPA transport channel. Shared by several UEs.	DL	4.1.2.7
2_TRANSPORT	PCH	paging channel	Carries paging procedure data (for sleep mode) used by network to establish connection to UE. Always transmitted over entire cell.	DL	4.1.2.3
2_TRANSPORT	RACH	random access channel	Used to gain access to the system when first attaching to it (can also carry packet data). Makes up the RACH/FACH pair. Always received from entire cell. Entails a collision risk. Transmitted using open loop power control.	UL	4.1.2.4
1_PHYSICAL	AICH	acquisition indicator channel	Carries acquisition indicators. AI corresponds to signature on the PRACH. Fixed rate (sf=256).	DL	5.3.3.7
1_PHYSICAL	CD/CA-ICH	collision detection/channel assignment indicator channel	Carries CD Indicator (CDI) or CD Indicator/CA Indicator (CDI/CAI). Fixed rate (sf=256). NOTE - removed after R5.	DL	5.3.3.9
1_PHYSICAL	CPICH	common pilot channel	Provides the default phase reference for demodulation of the other downlink channels and enables channel estimation. Uses a pre-defined bit sequence. Fixed rate (sf=256).	DL	5.3.3.11
1_PHYSICAL	CSICH	cpch status indication channel	Carries CPCH status information. Fixed rate (sf=256). NOTE - removed after R5.	DL	5.3.3.11
1_PHYSICAL	DPCCH	dedicated physical control channel	Carries physical layer control information including known pilot bits to support channel estimation, transmit power-control (TPC) commands, feedback information (FBI) and, optionally, transport-format combination indicator (TFCI).	UL/DL	5.3.3.11
1_PHYSICAL	DPDCH	dedicated physical data channel	Carries DCH data. Used with DPCCH. May be multiple DPDCHs on each radio link.	UL/DL	5.3.3.11
1_PHYSICAL	E-AGCH	enhanced absolute grant channel	[HSUPA] Establishes absolute power lever for UE transmission on E-DCH. Fixed rate (sf=256).	DL	5.3.3.14
1_PHYSICAL	E-DPCCH	enhanced dedicated physical control channel	[HSUPA] Control information associated with E-DCH. Transmitted along with E-DPDCH.	UL/DL	5.2.1.3
1_PHYSICAL	E-DPDCH	enhanced dedicated physical data channel	[HSUPA] Carries the E-DCH transport channel. Transmitted along with E-DPCCH.	UL	5.2.1.3
1_PHYSICAL	E-HICH	enhanced hybrid indicator channel	[HSUPA] Dedicated channel which carries the E-DCH hybrid ARQ acknowledgement indicator. Fixed rate (sf=128).	DL	5.3.2.5
1_PHYSICAL	E-RGCH	enhanced relative grant channel	[HSUPA] Carries the uplink E-DCH relative grants. Fixed rate (sf=128).	DL	5.3.2.4
1_PHYSICAL	HS-DPCCH	high speed dedicated physical control channel	[HSDPA] Carries feedback signalling related to HS-DSCH including HARQ-ACK and CQI.	UL	5.2.1.2
1_PHYSICAL	HS-PDSCH	high speed physical downlink shared channel	[HSDPA] Carries actual user data for HS-DSCH.	DL	5.3.3.13
1_PHYSICAL	HS-SCCH	high speed shared control channel	[HSDPA] Contains downlink signalling information related to HS-DSCH. Fixed rate (sf=128).	DL	5.3.3.12
1_PHYSICAL	P-CCPCH	primary common control physical channels	Carries BCH (Broadcast Channel). There is one P-CCPCH within a cell used to carry synchronization and broadcast information for all users.	DL	5.3.3.3
1_PHYSICAL	PCPCH	physical common packet channel	Carries CPCH (Common Packet Channel). NOTE - removed after R5.	UL	5.2.2.2
1_PHYSICAL	PDSCH	physical downlink shared channel	Carries DSCH. NOTE - removed after R5.	DL	5.3.3.6
1_PHYSICAL	PICH	page indicator channel	Carries PCH. Fixed rate (sf=256).	DL	5.3.3.10
1_PHYSICAL	PRACH	physical random access channel	Carries RACH (Random Access Channel).	UL	5.2.2.1
1_PHYSICAL	S-CCPCH	secondary common control physical channels	Carries FACH (Forward Access Channel) and PCH (Paging Channel).	DL	5.3.3.4
1_PHYSICAL	SCH	synchronization channel	Used for cell search and conveying synchronization information. Consists of two sub-channels - Primary and Secondary SCH.	DL	5.3.3.5

== See also ==
- UMTS
- High Speed Packet Access
- 3GPP Long Term Evolution (aka 4G/LTE)

== Sources ==
- 3GPP specification series 25—Radio aspects of 3G, including UMTS
- TS 25.101 User Equipment (UE) radio transmission and reception (FDD)
- TS 25.201 Description—Describes basic differences between FDD and TDD.
- TS 25.211_PHYSICAL channels and mapping of transport channels onto physical channels (FDD)
- TS 25.212 Multiplexing and channel coding (FDD)
- TS 25.213 Spreading and modulation (FDD)
- TS 25.214 Physical layer procedures (FDD)
- TS 25.215 Physical layer - Measurements (FDD)
- TS 25.301 Radio interface protocol architecture
