= DPDCH =

Term from UMTS

DPDCH, Dedicated Physical Data CHannel, is a term from UMTS. This is the physical channel on radio interface (Uu) on which payload (e.g. IP data, voice) as well as higher layer signalling (RRC and Non Access Stratum [NAS] signalling) is transmitted both, on the uplink by the (user equipment) UE to the Node B (the base transceiver station) and on the downlink, by the Node B to the UE.

Over a radio link, there can exist more than one DPDCH. The spreading factor for this vary between 256 and 4, hence the no. of bits per radio frame vary from 150 bits to 9600 bits respectively. The uplink scrambling code assigned to the DPDCH is used to identify the connection at the Node B receiver. 3GPP TS 25.213 specifies that if more than a single DPDCH is configured then all DPDCH must use a spreading factor of 4 and that a maximum of 6 DPDCH can be configured.
