= Timing advance =

Timing correction in the GSM/LTE/5G NR cellular standards

Timing advance (TA) is a time correction applied to user transmissions in cellular GSM, LTE, and 5G NR networks. It is used to compensate for differences in signal arrival times at the base station, caused by the different propagation distances of users within the same cell. By doing so, uplink signals from different users are received aligned with the network's expected timing, preventing inter-user interference.

This correction has a limited granularity, whose value depends on the specific cellular technology. Because propagation delays cannot be estimated perfectly, communication systems include guard interval to tolerate small residual timing errors. In GSM, this is achieved through a guard period between time slots, while in LTE and 5G NR the same function is provided by the cyclic prefix.

The initial correction value is estimated by the base station from the time elapsed between a downlink transmission and the corresponding uplink reception, which reflects the signal round-trip time. As a consequence, the maximum timing advance value is directly related to two times the maximum cell radius.

Once the user equipment is connected to the cellular network, successive timing advance measurements are performed by the base station. These continuously compare the expected uplink reception instant with the actual measured arrival time and command timing adjustments to each user accordingly.

== GSM ==
In GSM, timing advance is used in combination with the time-division multiple access radio interface, where multiple users share the same frequency channel by transmitting in different time slots. To ensure correct synchronization, mobile devices must transmit slightly earlier than their nominal transmission time so that their signals arrive within the assigned slot at the base station. The timing advance value is determined by the base station after measuring the propagation delay between downlink and uplink transmissions during an active connection. It is then periodically updated and communicated to the mobile device, allowing synchronization to be maintained as the user moves within the cell. In standard GSM operation, these updates are typically transmitted about twice per second.

The timing advance value can range from 0 to 63, with each increment corresponding to one bit period, approximately 3.69$\,\mu s$. Since radio waves propagate at approximately the speed of light, each increment corresponds to a change of about 550$\,m$ in the distance between the mobile device and the base station. This limits the maximum supported cell radius under standard GSM operation to approximately 35$\,km$.

When a new connection is established or during a handover between cells, the timing advance procedure must be initialized before normal traffic transmission can begin. If no prior timing information is available, the mobile device initially transmits special access bursts without timing correction, allowing the base station to estimate the propagation delay and determine the required timing advance value.

In some scenarios, such as rural or maritime deployments, the standard GSM range of approximately 35 kilometers may not be sufficient. In these cases, an extended timing advance feature is available in GSM 400, where the base station increases the uplink reception window, allowing communication over larger distances (roughly 120 km) at the cost of reduced spectral efficiency.

== LTE ==
In LTE, timing advance is used in the uplink SC-FDMA system to ensure that transmissions from different user equipments arrive time-aligned at the eNodeB. The timing advance granularity is $0.52\,\mu s$, meaning that users whose distances from the eNodeB differ by less than $78\,m$ are assigned the same timing advance value. The maximum timing advance in LTE (converted in seconds) corresponds to $0.67\,\mathrm{ms}$, which is equivalent to a maximum cell range of approximately $100\,km$.

In TDD deployment mode, an additional $20\,\mu s$ offset is added to the timing advance correction to allow the eNodeB time to switch from reception to transmission. As a result, uplink transmissions arrive slightly before the nominal network frame timing, ensuring that the eNodeB can begin the following downlink transmission at the correct scheduled time.

A validity timer is started when the UE receives a timing advance value. If the timer expires, the current timing advance information is considered no longer reliable, and the UE must re-establish uplink synchronization through the Random Access (RACH) procedure.

The initial timing advance value is determined during the Random Access procedure. During the connection, the timing advance is continuously adjusted based on measurements performed by the eNodeB on uplink signals transmitted by the UE. By comparing the expected and actual reception timing, the eNodeB estimates the timing error and signals a correction value to the UE.

The timing advance value can also be exploited by the Enhanced Cell ID localization method to estimate the distance between the UE and the serving base station. However, the measured value includes the total round-trip delay between the UE and the network, including delays introduced by the hardware after the baseband processing on both sides. For this reason the LTE network compensates for these additional delays to improve the accuracy of the distance estimate.

Starting from 3GPP Release 11, LTE supports carrier aggregation across non-colocated cells by allowing different timing advance values to be assigned to different serving cells. Groups of cells sharing the same timing advance value for a given UE are referred to as Timing Advance Groups (TAGs).

== NR ==
5G NR inherits most of the timing advance mechanisms introduced in LTE. However, NR introduces the concept of numerology, which allows the use of different subcarrier spacings and correspondingly shorter OFDM symbol durations. As OFDM symbol durations become shorter, the same timing error has a larger relative impact on signal alignment, increasing interference between uplink transmissions from different users. Consequently, higher numerologies require a finer timing advance granularity.

For this reason, in 5G NR, the timing advance granularity is given by $\frac{0.52\,\mu s}{2^\mu}$, where $\mu$ denotes the numerology index associated with the subcarrier spacing. For $\mu = 0$, corresponding to a subcarrier spacing of $15\,kHz$, the timing advance granularity is identical to LTE. For $\mu = 5$, corresponding to a subcarrier spacing of $480\,kHz$, the timing advance step is reduced to approximately $16\,ns$, corresponding to a distance resolution of about $2.44\,m$. For $\mu = 0$, the maximum timing advance supported by NR corresponds to approximately $2\, ms$, which translates into a maximum cell range of about $300\,km$. This extended range allows NR to support deployment scenarios requiring significantly larger cell coverage compared with previous cellular network generations.

=== Non-terrestrial networks ===
Even though the maximum cell range supported by 5G NR was extended up to approximately $300\,km$, non-terrestrial networks (NTNs), in which communication is provided through airborne or spaceborne platforms such as satellites rather than conventional terrestrial infrastructure, involve significantly larger communication distances, since low Earth orbit satellites typically operate at altitudes of several hundred kilometers, while geostationary orbit satellites are located at approximately $36,000\,km$. As a result, the associated propagation delays largely exceed those encountered in terrestrial cellular systems, requiring modifications to the conventional timing advance mechanism.

In addition, satellites, particularly in low Earth orbit, move at high speed relative to the Earth, causing the propagation delay to continuously vary over time. Without using information about the satellite trajectory to predict these variations, frequent timing advance updates from the network would be required, increasing signaling overhead.

Non-terrestrial networks therefore introduce additional correction mechanisms on top of the closed-loop timing advance procedure used in terrestrial networks. One correction compensates for delay components common to all users connected through the same satellite coverage area, primarily associated with the communication path between the satellite and the ground gateway station, known as the feeder link. Another correction accounts for the propagation delay specific to each user, which depends on the distance between the user equipment and the satellite, referred to as the service link.

The user equipment estimates the user-specific delay using its own position, typically obtained through satellite navigation systems such as GNSS, together with orbital information describing the satellite trajectory. The network, on the other hand, provides information related to the common delay component, including how this value changes over time, the reference instant from which the provided information is valid, and the time interval during which it remains accurate.

== See also ==
- Carrier aggregation
- Cyclic prefix
- Orthogonal frequency-division multiplexing
- Random-access channel
- Round-trip delay
- Single-carrier FDMA
