= Rach =

Rach may refer to:

- Random Access Channel (RACH), a feature of mobiles or other wireless devices
- Rach, Iran, a village in South Khorasan Province, Iran
- Sergei Rachmaninoff, the composer. "Rach" (/ˈrɑːx/) is a colloquial short form of his surname, most commonly used to refer to some of his compositions, such as "Rach 2" (Piano Concerto No. 2) and "Rach 3" (No. 3)
- Rachel (given name). "Rach" /ˈreɪtʃ/ is the colloquial short form of this given name
- Royal Aberdeen Children's Hospital or RACH, a paediatric hospital, in Aberdeen, Scotland

== Other ==
- Johannes Rach (1720–1783), Danish painter who sketched Batavia (now Jakarta, Indonesia) in the 17th century
- Rach, the traditional name for Saint Dismas in the Eastern Orthodox Churches
