= Radio Bearer in UMTS =

Mobile telephony concept

In mobile telephony a bearer service is a link between two points, which is defined by a certain set of characteristics. Whenever user equipment (UE) is being provided with any service (CS/PS service), the service has to be associated with a Radio Bearer specifying the configuration for layer 2 and physical layer in order to have its QoS clearly defined. Radio bearers are channels offered by Layer 2 to higher layers for the transfer of either user or control data. In other words, Layer 2 offers to the upper layers the service of information transmission between the UE and the UTRAN by means of the Radio Bearers (RBs) and Signaling Radio Bearers (SRBs). Therefore, the service access points between Layer 2 and upper layers are RBs.

== Radio Access Bearers (RAB) ==
The purpose of a Radio Access Bearer (RAB) is to provide a connection segment using the WCDMA Radio Access Network (WCDMA RAN) for support of a UMTS bearer service. The WCDMA RAN can provide Radio Access Bearer connections with different characteristics in order to match requirements for different UMTS bearers.

- The conversational speech RAB is tailored to 12.2 kbit/s Adaptive Multi Rate (AMR) speech and will also be used to carry emergency calls.
- Video telephony and ftp services may be offered across the Conversational 64 kbit/s Circuit Switched (CS) RAB.
- The streaming 57.6 kbit/s is offered to support a specific modem.
- The new PS streaming 8/54 kbit/s RAB will be implemented on DCH. This streaming RAB will be supported only in combination with PS interactive 8/8 kbit/s RB, no standalone PS streaming RAB will be supported.
- The maximum data rate supported by the Interactive RAB (Packet Switched, PS) is 384 kbit/s in the downlink and 64 kbit/s in the uplink, making it ideal for email or web browsing.
- It is also possible to use the speech RAB together with the interactive RAB that is usually called a MultiRAB.

== Signaling Radio Bearer (SRB) parameters ==
A Signaling Radio Bearer (SRB) is a radio bearer that carries DCCH signaling data. An SRB is used during connection establishment to establish the Radio Access Bearers (RABs) and then also to deliver signaling while on the connection (for example, to perform a handover, reconfiguration or release).

The test set supports three SRBs:

3.4k DCCH - see 3GPP TS 34.108 6.10.2.4.1.2

13.6k DCCH - see 3GPP TS 34.108 6.10.2.4.1.3

2.2k DCCH - this signaling radio bearer has the following properties:

Transport channel parameters	
TrCH Type	DCH (DCCH)
TB size	100
TF 0	0 x 100
TF 1	1 x 100
TTI (ms)	40
Coding type	Conv, 1/3
CRC	12 bit
Downlink physical channel	
DTX Position	n/a
TFCI	used
Slot structure	5
SF	256
Uplink physical channel	
Min. spreading factor	256
DPCCH slot format	0
TFCI	used

During connection establishment, an RRC Connection Setup procedure establishes the SRB. The SRB is then used to send all subsequent signaling to start the desired service and establish the radio bearers for the service. Establishment of the radio bearers is achieved using an RB Setup procedure. The RB Setup procedure configures how both the DCCH and DTCH will be carried on the radio bearers.

The RB Setup may specify a different DCCH RLC block size from the DCCH RLC block size that was being used when only an SRB was present. For example, the DCCH RLC block size for the default 3.4k DCCH SRB is 144 bits, but all RMCs (Reference Measurement Channels) call for a DCCH RLC block size of 96 bits. If the RB Setup specifies a change in the DCCH RLC block size from the stand-alone SRB configuration, the UE and network must change the DCCH RLC block size and then perform an RLC Re-establishment procedure to reset the RLC buffers. If your UE does not support changing the DCCH RLC block size during connection setup, you must establish the call using an SRB with a DCCH RLC block size that is equal to the DCCH RLC block size defined for the service you wish to establish.
