= DPCCH =

DPCCH, Dedicated Physical Control CHannel, is a term from UMTS. This is the physical channel on which the signalling is transmitted, both on the uplink by the UE (user equipment) to the Node B (the base transceiver station) and on the downlink by the Node B to the UE.
