= ENodeB =

Mobile phone network element

E-UTRAN Node B, also known as Evolved Node B (abbreviated as eNodeB or eNB), is the element in E-UTRA of LTE that is the evolution of the element Node B in UTRA of UMTS. It is the hardware that is connected to the mobile phone network that communicates directly wirelessly with mobile handsets (UEs), like a base transceiver station (BTS) in GSM networks.

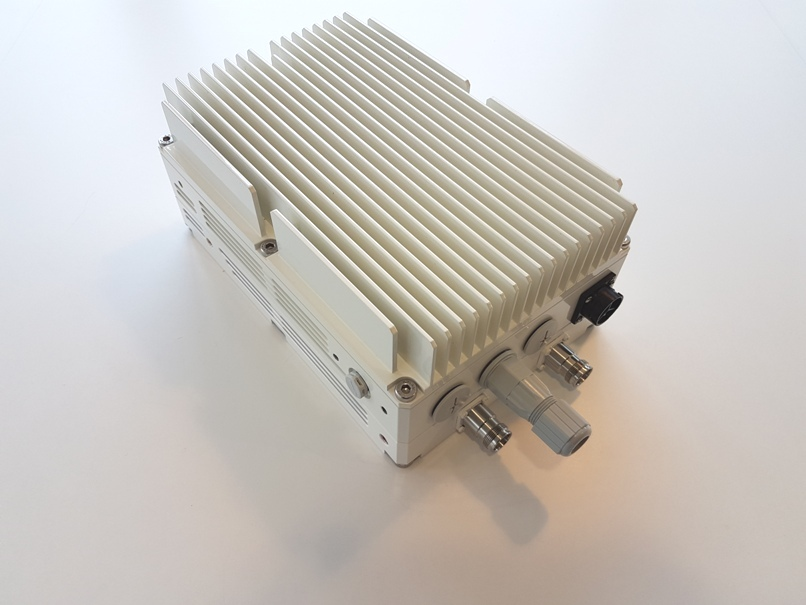
CableFree 4G/5G Remote Radio Head (RRH) with 2x2 MIMO, 2x20W RF power and CPRI fibre interface

Traditionally, a Node B has minimum functionality, and is controlled by a Radio Network Controller (RNC). However, with an eNB, there is no separate controller element. This simplifies the architecture and allows faster response times.

== Differences between an evolved Node B and a Node B ==
=== Air interface ===
eNB uses the E-UTRA protocols OFDMA (downlink) and SC-FDMA (uplink) on its LTE-Uu interface. By contrast, NodeB uses the UTRA protocols WCDMA or TD-SCDMA on its Uu interface.

=== Control functionality ===
eNB embeds its own control functionality, rather than using a RNC (Radio Network Controller) as does a Node B.

=== Network interfaces ===
eNB interfaces with the System Architecture Evolution (SAE) core (also known as Evolved Packet Core (EPC)) and other eNB as follows:

- eNB uses the S1-AP protocol on the S1-MME interface with the Mobility Management Entity (MME) for control plane traffic.
