= RNSAP =

RNSAP (Radio Network Subsystem Application Part) is a 3GPP signalling protocol responsible for communications between RNCs Radio Network Controllers defined in 3GPP specification TS 25.423. It is carried on the lur interface and provides functionality needed for soft handovers and SRNS (Serving Radio Network Subsystem) relocation (handoff between RNCs). It defines signalling between RNCs, including SRNC (Serving RNC) and DRNC (drift RNC).

     SRNC        |             DRNC
      |          IUR             |
    RNSAP        |             RNSAP
      |          |               |

Converge protol | Converge protol

      |          |               |
   AAL 5         |             AAL5
    ATM          |             ATM

Physical links------→→→ Physical links

RNSAP Layer Architecture

== Procedures ==
- RNSAP Basic Mobility Procedures-

This set of procedures is used to handle mobility with in the UTRAN.This is the most important of the RNSAP procedures. The procedures belonging to this set includes SRNC relocation, inter-RNC cell update and UTRAN registration area update.

- RNSAP DCH procedures-

This set of procedure used to handle dedicated channel traffic (it includes DCH, DSCH and TDD USCH) between two RNCs. Unlike the basic mobility procedures which is used only for signalling, this set of procedures provides support for data transfer over the Iur interface. The data transfer takes place using a frame protocol. The procedures belonging to this set include establishment, modification and release of dedicated channel in the DRNC due to hard and soft handover, set-up/release of dedicated transport connections over Iur interface and data transfer for dedicated channels.

- RNSAP Common Transport Channel Procedures-

This set of procedures is used to handle common and shared channel traffic (it excludes DCH, DSCH and TDD USCH) between two RNCs. In particular, this set of procedures facilitates the set-up and release of common channel transport connections over the Iur interface.

- RNSAP Global Procedures-

Implementation of this is considered as optional.

== Summary of Functions ==
- Radio link management and supervision
- Physical channel reconfiguration
- Measurements on dedicated resources
- Downlink power drifting correction
- Rate control (used by DRNC to control the uplink and downlink transfer rate for each DCH configured for the radio links of the UE).
- Common control channel signaling transfer
- Paging
- Common transport channel resource management
- Relocation procedures (SRNC to DRNC)
- Reporting of general error situations
- Measurements on common resources
- Information exchange
- Iur interface reset
