= Operations and maintenance centre =

In mobile networks, an operation and maintenance center is the central location to operate and maintain the network.

There are various types of OMCs depending on the functionality:

- OMC-B (for maintaining Node B)
- OMC-R (radio. for maintaining RNC)
- UMTS OMC-U
- GPRS OMC-G
- OMC-DO
- OMC-IP
