= Cell breathing =

Cell breathing may refer to:

- Cellular respiration, metabolic reactions and processes that take place in the cells of organisms
- Cell breathing (telephony), radio interference from other mobile transmitters in the same cell
