= Cat5 =

Cat5 or CAT5 may refer to:

- Category 5 hurricane, used in the Saffir–Simpson Hurricane Scale
- Category 5 cable, unshielded twisted pair type cable
- Port McNeill Airport, the ICAO airport code (CAT5)
- LTE User Equipment Category 5
