= UMTS Terrestrial Radio Access Network =

Collective term for network equipment of UMTS

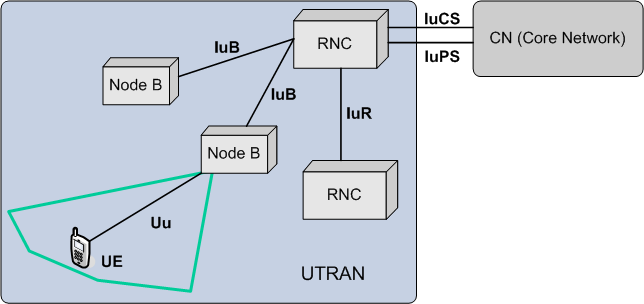
UTRAN architecture

UMTS Terrestrial Radio Access Network (UTRAN) is a collective term for a kind of network and equipment that connects mobile handsets to the public telephone network or the Internet. It contains the base stations, which are called Node B's and Radio Network Controllers (RNCs), making up the Universal Mobile Telecommunications System (UMTS) radio access network. This communications network, commonly referred to as 3G (for 3rd Generation Wireless Mobile Communication Technology), can carry many traffic types from real-time circuit switched to IP based packet switched. The UTRAN allows connectivity between the UE (user equipment) and the core network.

The RNC provides control functionalities for one or more Node Bs. A Node B and an RNC can be the same device, although typical implementations have a separate RNC that is located in a central office serving multiple Node Bs. Despite the fact that they do not have to be physically separated, there is a logical interface between them known as the Iub. The RNC and its corresponding Node Bs are called the Radio Network Subsystem (RNS). There can be more than one RNS present in a UTRAN.

There are four interfaces connecting the UTRAN internally or externally to other functional entities: Iu, Uu, Iub and Iur. The Iu interface is an external interface that connects the RNC to the Core Network (CN). The Uu is also external, connecting Node B with the User Equipment (UE). The Iub is an internal interface connecting the RNC with Node B. And at last, there is the Iur interface, which is an internal interface most of the time but can exceptionally be an external interface too for some network architectures. The Iur connects two RNCs with each other.

== See also ==
- UMTS - Universal Mobile Telecommunications System
- GERAN - GSM EDGE Radio Access Network
- E-UTRAN
