= GERAN =

Network equipment of GSM and EDGE standards

GERAN is an abbreviation for GSM EDGE Radio Access Network. The standards for GERAN are maintained by the 3GPP (Third Generation Partnership Project). GERAN is a key part of GSM, and also of combined UMTS/GSM networks.

GERAN is the radio part of GSM/EDGE together with the network that joins the base stations (the Ater and Abis interfaces) and the base station controllers (A interfaces, etc.) The network represents the core of a GSM network, through which phone calls and packet data are routed from and to the PSTN and Internet to and from subscriber handsets. A mobile phone operator's network comprises one or more GERANs, coupled with UTRANs in the case of a UMTS/GSM network.

A GERAN without EDGE is a GRAN, but is otherwise identical in concept.

A GERAN without GSM is an ERAN.

== See also ==
- UTRAN : UMTS Terrestrial Radio Access Network
