= Opportunity-Driven Multiple Access =

Opportunity-Driven Multiple Access (ODMA) is a UMTS communications relaying protocol standard first introduced by the European Telecommunication Standards Institute (ETSI) in 1996. ODMA has been adopted by the 3rd-Generation Partnership Project, 3GPP to improve the efficiency of UMTS networks using the TDD mode. One of the objectives of ODMA is to enhance the capacity and the coverage of radio transmissions towards the boundaries of the cell. While mobile stations under the cell coverage area can communicate directly with the base station, mobile stations outside the cell boundary can still access the network and communicating with the base station via multihop transmission. Mobile stations with high data rate inside the cell are used as multihop relays.

The initial concept of Opportunity Driven Multiple Access (ODMA) was conceived and patented in South Africa by David Larsen and James Larsen of SRD Pty Ltd in 1978

The ODMA standard was tabled by the 3GPP committee in 1999 due to complexity issues. The technology continues to be developed and enhanced by IWICS who holds the key patents describing the methods employed in ODMA to effect opportunity driven communications.

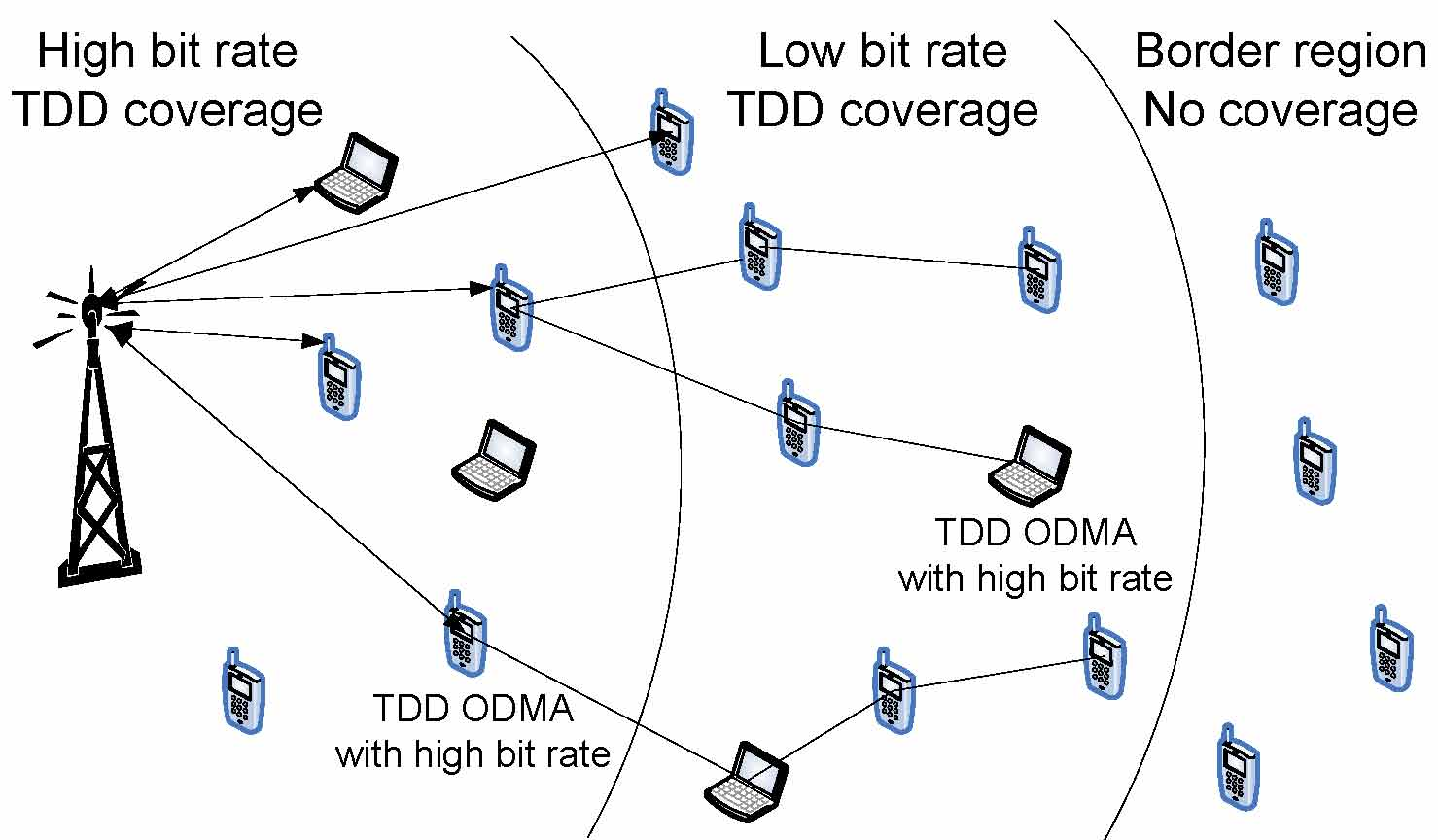
ODMA border coverage

== ODMA Technology ==
Basic Concepts

With the explosion of cellular phone use and Internet multi-media services, wireless networks are becoming increasingly congested. The increased demand has raised our expectations, while creating capacity problems and a need for greater bandwidth. However, if the transmitted power of wireless units is significantly reduced, then there is a potential solution. This implies a signal-to-noise ratio improvement: the ratio is affected by numerous parameters, including radio frequency and path. Opportunity Driven Multiple Access (ODMA) continually determines optimal points along that path to support each transmission.

Adaptation ODMA uses many adaptation techniques to optimize communications, but one of the most powerful is path diversity. From origin to destination, ODMA stations relay the transmissions in an intelligent and efficient manner.

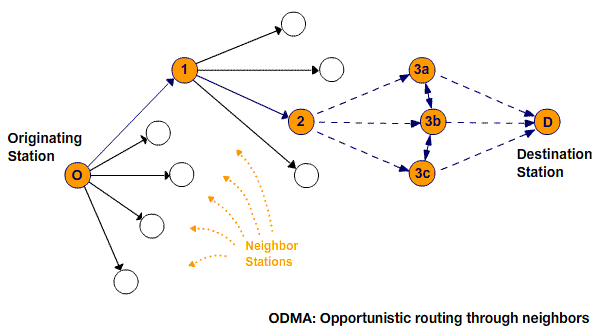
ODMA Routing

Each Subscriber Builds the Network

The available optimal paths will increase as subscribers join the network, supporting a fundamental aspect of the ODMA philosophy: Communications are dynamic and local, best controlled at the station level, rather than from some centralized source. Each ODMA-network station is an intelligent burst-mode radio, which can use all the available bandwidth some of the time. However, as with any technology, weather or general network conditions can affect transmissions.

Efficiency with Sub-Bands

Like cellular networks, the ODMA-network stations operate in the same wide frequency band, but frequency hopping, at lower data rates, introduces sub-bands. Because transmission is packet based and connectionless, stations relay packets from neighbor stations. For each packet, a station optimizes the transmission by adapting the route, power, data rate, packet length, frequency, time window and data quality over a wide range. Each station has responsibility and much autonomy for routing and service-enhancing adaptation to the current environment. For security, stations accept the authority of a network supervisor.

== See also ==
- 3G
- 3GPP: the body that manages the UMTS standards
- CDMA: Code-division multiple access
- TDMA: Time-division multiple access
- FDMA: Frequency-division multiple access
