= Polaris Networks =

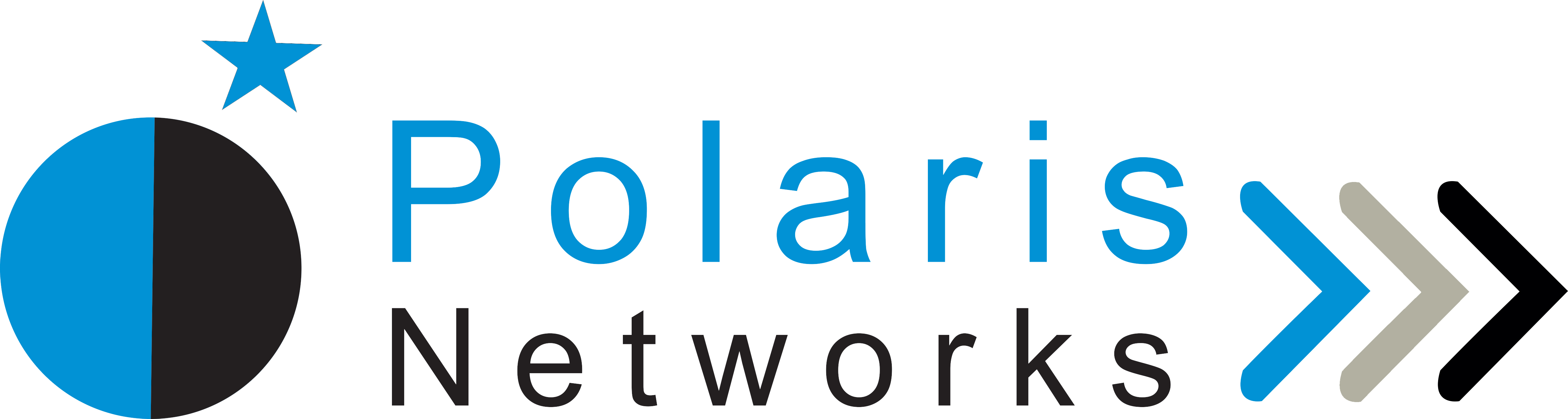
- Company type: Private
- Industry: Wireless Test Equipment
- Founded: 2003
- Headquarters: Chicago, Illinois
- Key people: Buddhadeb Biswas (Co-Founder, President and CEO); Vinay Gupta (Co-Founder, Chief Technology Officer); Aditya Saraf (Vice President, Sales & Marketing); Pradip Biswas (Director of Software Engineering)
- Website: www.polarisnetworks.net

Polaris Networks is a networking software company founded in 2003 by some employees of Agilent Technologies of Santa Clara, California. Its headquarters are in Chicago, and it has an overseas office in Kolkata. It focuses on developing networking protocol software, and its products primarily include wireless protocol test tools and emulators for 3GPP LTE networks.

In 2012, CERN selected the xTCA Test Tools developed by Polaris Networks for the internal testing of their xTCA systems, including those of the Large Hadron Collider.

In April 2013, Polaris Networks announced the cloud-based deployment of their NetEPC, a carrier-grade EPC which combines the functionality of the MME, SGW, PGW, HSS and PCRF into a single high-availability platform. And in June 2013, the Public Safety Communications Research Program used the Polaris Networks NetEPC to demonstrate deployable LTE at the Public Safety Broadband Stakeholder Conference in Westminster, Colorado. In June 2018, Polaris Networks and Nemergent Solutions completed interoperability tests between Polaris Networks’ NetEPC and Nemergent's Mission Critical Services (MCS) application server.

Polaris was acquired by Motorola Solutions in 2020 and relocated from California to Chicago.
