= Packet Data Convergence Protocol =

Packet Data Convergence Protocol (PDCP) is specified by 3GPP in TS 25.323 for UMTS, TS 36.323 for LTE and TS 38.323 for 5G. PDCP is located in the Radio Protocol Stack in the UMTS/LTE/5G air interface on top of the RLC layer.

PDCP provides its services to the RRC and user plane upper layers, e.g. IP at the UE or to the relay at the base station. The following services are provided by PDCP to upper layers:

- transfer of user plane data;
- transfer of control plane data;
- header compression;
- ciphering;
- integrity protection.

The header compression technique can be based on either IP header compression (RFC 2507) or Robust Header Compression (RFC 3095). If PDCP is configured for No Compression, it will send the IP packets without compression; otherwise it will compress the packets according to its configuration by upper layer and attach a PDCP header and send the packet.

Different header formats are defined, dependent on the type of data to be transported. In LTE, there are e.g. header formats for Control Plane PDCP Data PDU with long PDCP SN (12 bits), for User plane PDCP Data PDU with short PDCP SN (7 bits) and others.
