= Air interface =

Radio communication link

The air interface, or access mode, is the communication link between the two stations in mobile or wireless communication. The air interface involves both the physical and data link layers (layer 1 and 2) of the OSI model for a connection.

== Physical Layer ==
The physical connection of an air interface is generally radio-based. This is usually a point to point link between an active base station and a mobile station. Technologies like Opportunity-Driven Multiple Access (ODMA) may have flexibility regarding which devices serve in which roles. Some types of wireless connections possess the ability to broadcast or multicast.

Multiple links can be created in limited spectrum through FDMA, TDMA, or SDMA. Some advanced forms of transmission multiplexing combine frequency- and time-division approaches like OFDM or CDMA. In cellular telephone communications, the air interface is the radio-frequency portion of the circuit between the cellular phone set or wireless modem (usually portable or mobile) and the active base station. As a subscriber moves from one cell to another in the system, the active base station changes periodically. Each changeover is known as a handoff.

In radio and electronics, an antenna (plural antennae or antennas), or aerial, is an electrical device which converts electric power into radio waves, and vice versa. It is usually used with a radio transmitter or radio receiver. In transmission, a radio transmitter supplies an electric current oscillating at radio frequency to the antenna's terminals, and the antenna radiates the energy from the current as electromagnetic waves (radio waves). An antenna focuses the radio waves in a certain direction. Usually, this is called the main direction. Because of that, in other directions less energy will be emitted. The gain of an antenna, in a given direction, is usually referenced to an (hypothetical) isotropic antenna, which emits the radiation evenly strong in all directions. The antenna gain is the power in the strongest direction divided by the power that would be transmitted by an isotropic antenna emitting the same total power. In this case the antenna gain (Gi) is often specified in dBi, or decibels over isotropic. Other reference antennas are also used, especially: •gain relative to a half-wave dipole (Gd), when the reference antenna is a half-wave dipole antenna; •gain relative to a short vertical antenna (Gv), when the reference antenna is a linear conductor, much shorter than one quarter of the wavelength.

== Data Link Layer ==
The data link layer in an air interface is often divided farther than the simple Media access control (MAC) and Logical link control (LLC) sublayers found in other OSI terminology. While the MAC sublayer is generally unmodified, the LLC sublayer is subdivided into two or more additional sublayers depending on the standard. Common sublayers include:

- Radio Link Control
- Packet Data Convergence Protocol
- Service data adaptation protocol

Especially in mobile telecommunication and internet broadband (...) Maximal combined input ratio with respect to signal to noise ratio estimation

1. The signals from each channel are added together
2. The gain of each channel is made proportional to the RMS signal level and inversely proportional to the mean square noise level in that channel.
3. Different proportionality constants are used for each channel.

smart matrix array for combine input signal gain separated them with filters and different types of output multiplexed schemes are used for approach to multiple users for example CDMA, FDMA, WCDMA, TDMA, and ODMA. Such way calls and network services are approach and authenticate to unique subscriber.

core network link protocols

== Standards ==
- GSM/UMTS
- various UTRA
- 5G NR
