= Non-access stratum =

Non-access stratum (NAS) is a functional layer in the NR, LTE, UMTS and GSM wireless telecom protocol stacks between the core network and user equipment. This layer is used to manage the establishment of communication sessions and for maintaining continuous communications with the user equipment as it moves. The NAS is defined in contrast to the Access Stratum which is responsible for carrying information over the wireless portion of the network. A further description of NAS is that it is a protocol for messages passed between the User Equipment, also known as mobiles, and Core Nodes (e.g. Mobile Switching Center, Serving GPRS Support Node, or Mobility Management Entity) that is passed transparently through the radio network. Examples of NAS messages include Update or Attach messages, Authentication Messages, Service Requests and so forth. Once the User Equipment (UE) establishes a radio connection, the UE uses the radio connection to communicate with the core nodes to coordinate service. The distinction is that the Access Stratum is for dialogue explicitly between the mobile equipment and the radio network and the NAS is for dialogue between the mobile equipment and core network nodes.

For LTE, the Technical Specification for NAS is 3GPP TS 24.301. For NR, the Technical Specification for NAS is TS 24.501.

+- – - – - -+       +- – - – - – -+
| HTTP      |       | Application |
+- – - – - -+       +- – - – - – -+
| TCP       |       | Transport   |
+- – - – - -+       +- – - – - – -+
| IP        |       | Internet    |
+- – - – - -+       +- – - – - – -+
| NAS       |       | Network     |
+- – - – - -+       +- – - – - – -+
| AS        |       | Link        |
+- – - – - -+       +- – - – - – -+
| Channels  |       | Physical    |
+- – - – - -+       +- – - – - – -+

== Functionality ==
The following functions exist in the non-access stratum:

- Mobility management: maintaining connectivity and active sessions with user equipment as the user moves
- Call control management
- Session management: establishing, maintaining and terminating communication links
- Identity management

== See also ==
- Mobility management
- GSM
- Communication protocol
- Internet protocol suite
- X.25 protocol suite
- OSI protocol suite
- 3GPP TS 24.301 Non-Access-Stratum (NAS) protocol for Evolved Packet System (EPS); Stage 3
