= Radio Network Controller =

UTRAN component similar to a base station controller in GSM hierarchy

The Radio Network Controller (RNC) is a governing element in the UMTS radio access network (UTRAN) and is responsible for controlling the Node Bs that are connected to it. The RNC carries out radio resource management, some of the mobility management functions and is the point where encryption is done before user data is sent to and from the mobile. The RNC connects to the Circuit Switched Core Network through Media Gateway (MGW) and to the SGSN (Serving GPRS Support Node) in the Packet Switched Core Network.

== Interfaces ==
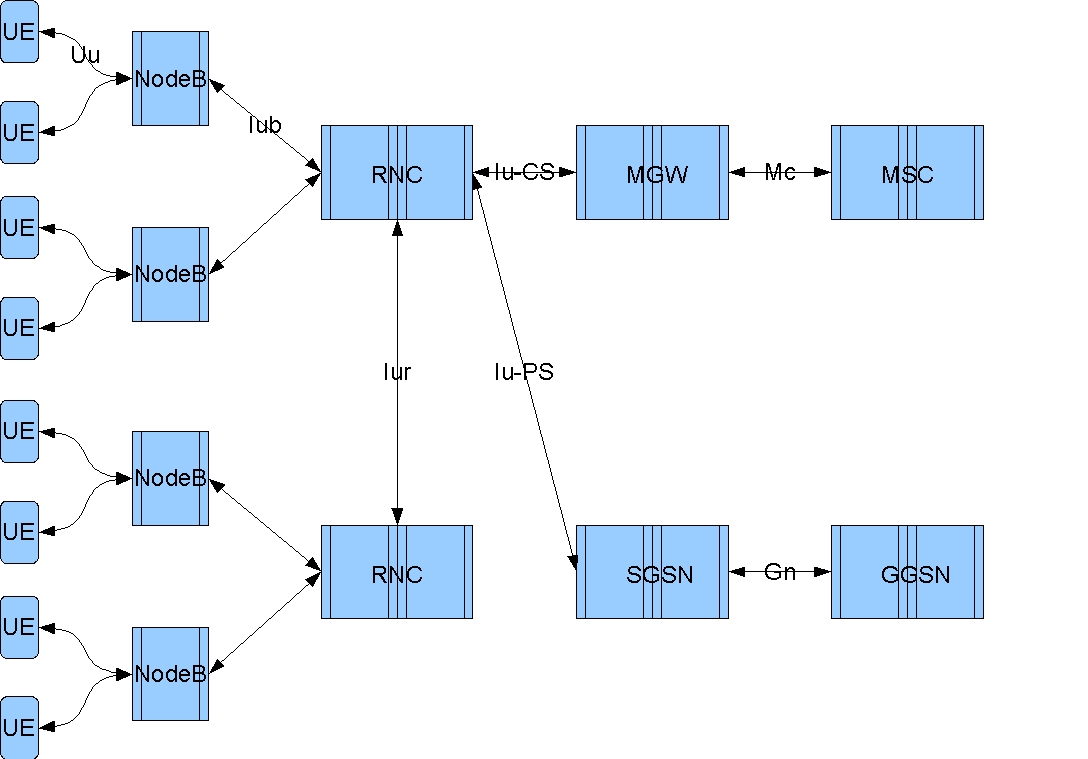
RNC Interfaces

The logical connections between the network elements are known as interfaces. The interface between the RNC and the Circuit Switched Core Network (CS-CN) is called Iu-CS and between the RNC and the Packet Switched Core Network is called Iu-PS. Other interfaces include Iub (between the RNC and the Node B) and Iur (between RNCs in the same network). Iu interfaces carry user traffic (such as voice or data) as well as control information (see § Protocols), and Iur interface is mainly needed for soft handovers involving 2 RNCs though not required as the absence of Iur will cause these handovers to become hard handovers.

Until 3gpp R4, all the interfaces in the UTRAN are implemented using ATM only, except the Uu (air) interface which uses WCDMA technology. Starting R5, IP bearers can be used over Ethernet instead. Physically, these interfaces can be carried over SDH over optical fiber, E1 (sometimes referred to as PDH) - over a copper wire or microwave radio. Several E1s can be bundled to form an IMA Group. Since the interfaces are logical, many interfaces can be multiplexed onto the same transmission line. The actual implementation depends on the network topology; examples are chain, distant star, mesh and loop configurations.

== Protocols ==
Iub, Iu and Iur protocols all carry both user data and signalling (that is, control plane).

- Signalling protocol responsible for the control of the Node B by the RNC is called NBAP (Node-B Application Part). NBAP is subdivided into Common and Dedicated NBAP (C-NBAP and D-NBAP), where Common NBAP controls overall Node B functionality and Dedicated NBAP controls separate cells or sectors of the Node B. NBAP is carried over Iub. In order for NBAP to handle common and dedicated procedures, it is divided into: NodeB Control Port (NCP) which handles common NBAP procedures and Communication Control Port (CCP) which handles dedicated NBAP procedures.
- Control plane protocol for the transport layer is called ALCAP (Access Link Control Application Protocol). Basic functionality of ALCAP is multiplexing of different users onto one AAL2 transmission path using channel IDs (CIDs). ALCAP is carried over Iub and Iu-CS interfaces.
- Signalling protocol responsible for communication between RNC and the core network is called RANAP (Radio Access Network Application Part), and is carried over Iu interface.
- Signalling protocol responsible for communications between RNCs is called RNSAP (Radio Network Subsystem Application Part) and is carried on the Iur interface.

== RNC roles ==
In a relationship to a UE (in a soft handover situation) an RNC can play two different roles. These are:

- D-RNC: Drift RNC
- S-RNC: Serving RNC

However, as far as the NodeB is concerned, the RNC may play a third role:

- C-RNC: Controlling RNC

It is important to know that one RNC can assume more than one role at any time.

An RNC also controls the power of a NodeB.

== See also ==
- Operations and Maintenance Centre
- Radio Resource Control
- UMTS
