= Radio Link Control =

Radio Link Control (RLC) is a layer 2 Radio Link Protocol used in GSM (GPRS), UMTS, LTE and 5G on the Air interface. This protocol is specified by 3GPP in TS 44.060 for GPRS, TS 25.322 for UMTS, TS 36.322 for LTE and TS 38.322 for 5G New Radio (NR). RLC is located on top of the 3GPP MAC-layer and below the PDCP-layer. The main tasks of the RLC protocol are:

- Transfer of upper layer Protocol Data Units (PDUs) in one of three modes: Acknowledged Mode (AM), Unacknowledged Mode (UM) and Transparent Mode (TM)
- Error correction through ARQ (only for AM data transfer)
- Concatenation, segmentation and reassembly of RLC Service Data Units (SDUs) (UM and AM)
- Re-segmentation of RLC data PDUs (AM)
- Reordering of RLC data PDUs (UM and AM);
- Duplicate detection (UM and AM);
- RLC SDU discard (UM and AM)
- RLC re-establishment
- Protocol error detection and recovery

RLC features specific to LTE only - 1) Re-segmentation. 2) RLC SDU discard is notified by upper layer.
