= UMTS security =

Aspect of Universal Mobile Telecommunications System

The Universal Mobile Telecommunications System (UMTS) is a third-generation (3G) mobile cellular communication system. UMTS builds on the success of the second-generation GSM system. One key factor in GSM's widespread adoption has been its security features. However, the new services introduced in UMTS require enhanced security mechanisms. Additionally, UMTS addresses certain real and perceived shortcomings in GSM security.

== Entity authentication ==
UMTS provides mutual authentication between the UMTS subscriber, represented by a smart card application known as the USIM (Universal Subscriber Identity Module), and the network in the following sense 'Subscriber authentication': the serving network corroborates the identity of the subscriber and 'Network authentication': the subscriber corroborates that he is connected to a serving network that is authorized, by the subscribers home network, to provide security

== Signalling data integrity and origin authentication ==
- Integrity algorithm agreement: the mobile station and the serving network can securely negotiate the integrity algorithm that they use.
- Integrity key agreement: the mobile and the network agree on an integrity key that they may use subsequently; this provides entity authentication.

== User traffic confidentiality ==
- Ciphering algorithm agreement: the mobile station and the network can securely negotiate ciphering algorithm that they use.
- Cipher key agreement: the mobile station and the network agree on a cipher key that they may use.
- Confidentiality of user and signalling data: neither user data nor sensitive signalling data can be overheard on the radio access interface.

== Network domain security ==
The term ‘network domain security’ in the 3G covers security of the communication between network elements. In particular, the mobile station is not affected by network domain security. The two communicating network elements may both be in the same network administrated by a mobile operator or they may belong to two different networks.

=== MAPSEC ===
The basic idea of MAPSEC can be described as follows. The plaintext MAP message is encrypted and the result is put into a ‘container’ in another MAP message. At the same time a cryptographic checksum, i.e. a message authentication code covering the original message, is included in the new MAP message. To be able to use encryption and message authentication codes, keys are needed. MAPSEC has borrowed the notion of a security association (SA) from IPsec.

== IP multimedia system security ==
The IP multimedia subsystem (IMS) is a core network subsystem within UMTS. It is based on the use of the Session Initiation Protocol (SIP)26 to initiate, terminate and modify multimedia sessions such as voice calls, video conferences, streaming and chat. SIP is specified by the Internet Engineering Task Force (IETF)27. IMS also uses the IETF Session Description Protocol (SDP)28 to specify the session parameters and to negotiate the codecs to be used. SIP runs on top of different IP transport protocols such as the User Datagram Protocol (UDP) and the Transmission Control Protocol (TCP).

A 3G IMS subscriber has one IP multimedia private identity (IMPI) and at least one IP multimedia public identity (IMPU). To participate in multimedia sessions, an IMS subscriber must register at least one IMPU with the IMS. The private identity is used only for authentication purposes.
