= Radio Resource Control =

Cellular network standard

The Radio Resource Control (RRC) protocol is used in UMTS, LTE and 5G on the Air interface. It is a layer 3 (Network Layer) protocol used between UE and Base Station. This protocol is specified by 3GPP in TS 25.331 for UMTS, in TS 36.331 for LTE and in TS 38.331 for 5G New Radio. RRC messages are transported via the PDCP-Protocol.

The major functions of the RRC protocol include connection establishment and release functions, broadcast of system information, radio bearer establishment, reconfiguration and release, RRC connection mobility procedures, paging notification and release and outer loop power control. By means of the signalling functions the RRC configures the user and control planes according to the network status and allows for Radio Resource Management strategies to be implemented.

The operation of the RRC is guided by a state machine which defines certain specific states that a UE may be present in. The different states in this state machine have different amounts of radio resources associated with them and these are the resources that the UE may use when it is present in a given specific state. Since different amounts of resources are available at different states the quality of the service that the user experiences and the energy consumption of the UE are influenced by this state machine.

== RRC inactivity timers ==
The configuration of RRC inactivity timers in a W-CDMA network has considerable impact on the battery life of a phone when a packet data connection is open.

The RRC idle mode (no connection) has the lowest energy consumption. The states in the RRC connected mode, in order of decreasing power consumption, are CELL_DCH (Dedicated Channel), CELL_FACH (Forward Access Channel), CELL_PCH (Cell Paging Channel) and URA_PCH (URA Paging Channel). The power consumption in the CELL_FACH is roughly 50 percent of that in CELL_DCH, and the PCH states use about 1-2 percent of the power consumption of the CELL_DCH state.

The transitions to lower energy consuming states occur when inactivity timers trigger. The T1 timer controls transition from DCH to FACH, the T2 timer controls transition from FACH to PCH, and the T3 timer controls transition from PCH to idle.

Different operators have different configurations for the inactivity timers, which leads to differences in energy consumption. Another factor is that not all operators use the PCH states.

== See also ==
- Radio Resource Management
- Mobility management
- Radio Network Controller
- UMTS
- WCDMA
