= Cell breathing (telephony) =

In CDMA-based cellular networks, cell breathing is a mechanism which allows overloaded cells to offload subscriber traffic to neighbouring cells by changing the geographic size of their service area. Heavily loaded cells decrease in size while neighbouring cells increase their service area to compensate. Thus, some traffic is handed off from the overloaded cell to neighbouring cells, resulting in load balancing.
