= Node B =

UMTS base station

In the UMTS architecture, Node B is the base station that provides the radio interface between mobile devices and the UMTS Terrestrial Radio Access Network. The definition, interfaces, and functional responsibilities of Node B are specified in the 3GPP TS 25.401 standard and related specifications, including: radio transmission and reception, power control, modulation and coding, the physical radio interface, radio resource management, and forwarding user data and signaling to a Radio Network Controller, which manages connections to the core network.

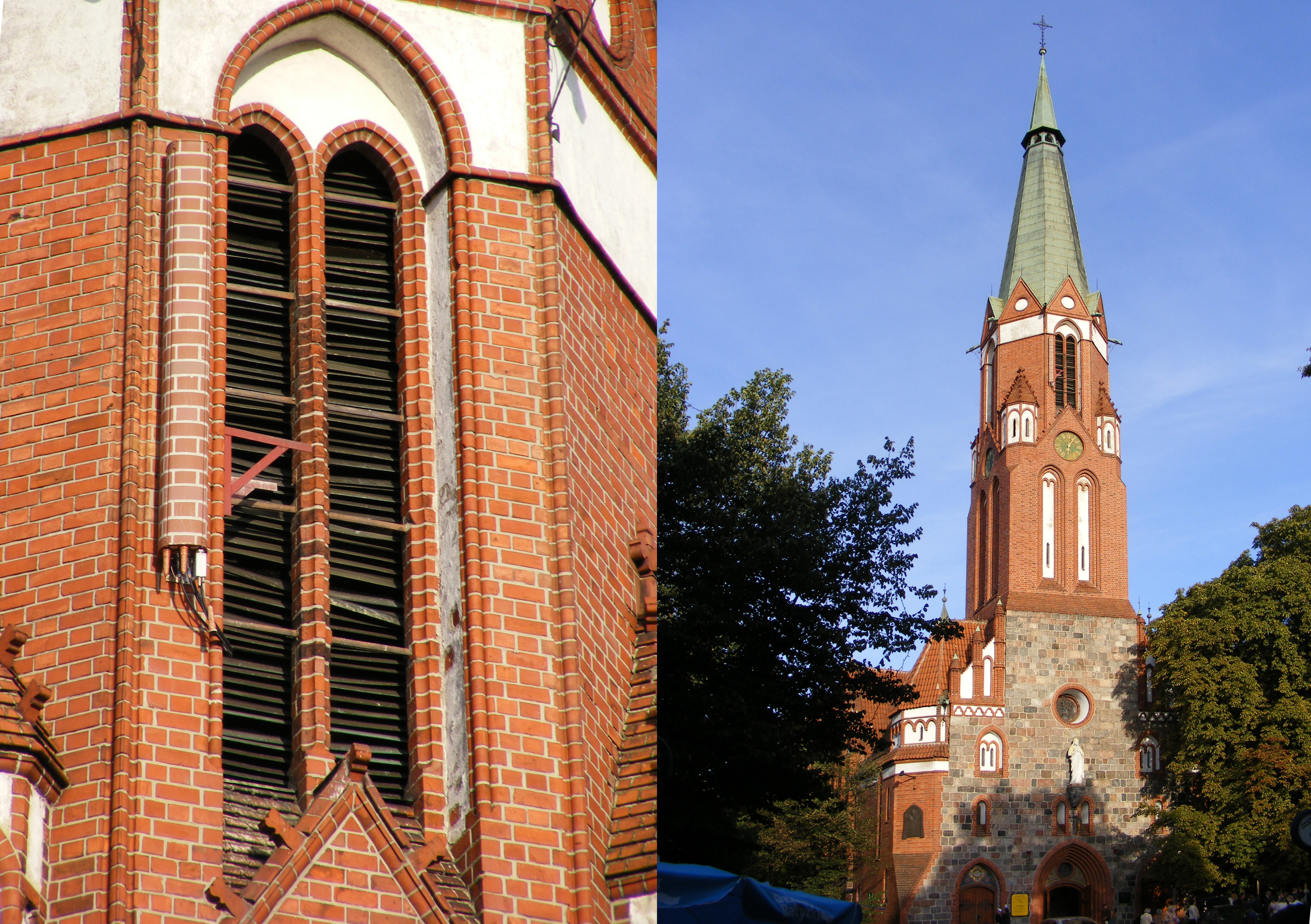
BTS and Node B antenna mounted on the church tower, Sopot, Poland

== Functionality ==
This is the hardware that is connected to the mobile phone network that communicates directly with mobile devices. In contrast with GSM base stations, Node B uses WCDMA/TD-SCDMA as the air interface technology. Node B contains radio frequency transmitter(s) and receiver(s) used to communicate directly with mobile devices, which move freely around it. In this type of network, the mobile devices cannot communicate directly with each other but have to communicate with the NodeB.

Traditionally, the Node Bs have minimum functionality, and are controlled by an Radio Network Controller. However, this is changing with the emergence of High Speed Downlink Packet Access (HSDPA), where some logic (e.g., retransmission) is handled in the Node B for lower response times.

== Differences between a Node B and a GSM base station ==
=== Frequency use ===
The utilization of WCDMA technology allows cells belonging to the same or different Node Bs and even controlled by different RNC to overlap and still use the same frequency (in fact, the whole network can be implemented with just one frequency pair). The effect is utilized in soft handovers.

=== Power requirements ===
Since WCDMA often operates at higher frequencies than GSM (2,100 MHz as opposed to 900 MHz for GSM), the cell radius can be considerably smaller for WCDMA than for GSM cells as the path loss is frequency dependent. WCDMA now has networks operating in the 850–900 MHz band. In these networks, at these frequencies, the coverage of WCDMA is considered better than that of the equivalent GSM network.

Unlike in GSM, the cells' size is not constant (a phenomenon known as "cell breathing"). This requires a larger number of Node Bs and careful planning in 3G (UMTS) networks. Power requirements on Node Bs and user equipment (UE) are much lower.

It is connected to RNC of UMTS network through an IUB interface.

== Node B setup ==
A full cell site has a cabinet, an antenna mast and actual antenna. An equipment cabinet contains e.g. RF power amplifiers, digital signal processors and backup batteries. What you can see by the side of a road or in a city center is just an antenna. However, the tendency nowadays is to camouflage the antenna (paint it the color of the building or put it into an RF-transparent enclosure). Smaller indoor nodes may have an antenna built into the cabinet door.

A Node B can serve several cells, also called sectors, depending on the configuration and type of antenna. Common configuration include omni cell (360°), 3 sectors (3×120°) or 6 sectors (60 degree each, not a very popular deployment).

== See also ==
- ENode B
- NBAP
- HSDPA
