= Random-access channel =

Channel used by wireless terminals

A random-access channel (RACH) is a shared channel used by wireless terminals to access the mobile network (TDMA/FDMA, and CDMA based network) for call set-up and bursty data transmission. Whenever mobile wants to make an MO (Mobile Originating) call it schedules the RACH. RACH is transport-layer channel; the corresponding physical-layer channel is PRACH.

== RACH for GSM standard ==
Since RACH is shared, there is a probability that two or more mobiles transmit at the same time and their transmissions collide in the medium (air) and they will not be granted access to the network. This happens because limit for number of mobiles transmitting in one RACH time slot is not defined in the GSM standard. If collision happens then mobile waits for random period of time and transmits the RACH again. RACH uses GSM 51 frame multiframe structure in the uplink to transmit information. Mostly TS1 is used but in high capacity GSM cell areas, TS2, TS4 and TS6 is also used for RACH leaving TS0 (mainly used for broadcast frequency).

A random-access channel like that of mobile phone networks is also used in the OpenAirMesh network, between cluster heads and mesh routers.

A key feature of a random-access channel is that messages are not scheduled (compared to, for example, a "dedicated channel" in UMTS, which is assigned exclusively to one user at a time). There is no certainty that only a single device makes a connection attempt at one time, so collisions can result.
