= UMTS =

Third generation mobile cellular system

3G sign in status bar of an Android smartphone

The Universal Mobile Telecommunications System (UMTS) is a 3G mobile cellular system for networks based on the GSM standard. UMTS uses wideband code-division multiple access (W-CDMA) radio access technology to offer greater spectral efficiency and bandwidth to mobile network operators compared to previous 2G systems like GPRS and CSD. The original version of UMTS provides a peak theoretical data rate of 384 kbit/s.

Developed and maintained by the 3GPP (3rd Generation Partnership Project), UMTS is a component of the International Telecommunication Union IMT-2000 standard set and compares with the CDMA2000 standard set for networks based on the competing cdmaOne technology. The technology described in UMTS is sometimes also referred to as Freedom of Mobile Multimedia Access (FOMA) or 3GSM.

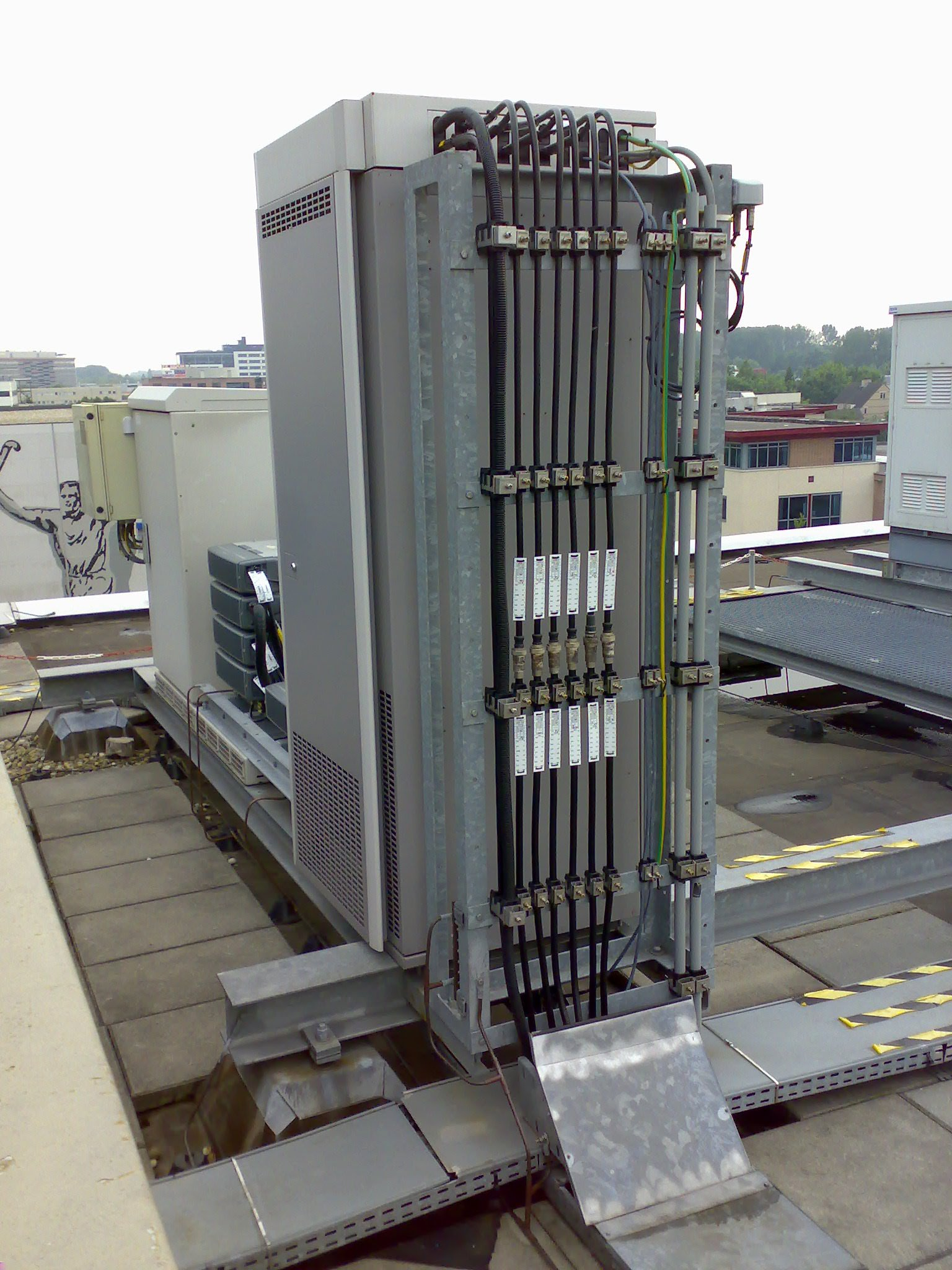
UMTS base station on the roof of a building

UMTS specifies a complete network system, which includes the radio access network (UMTS Terrestrial Radio Access Network, or UTRAN), the core network (Mobile Application Part, or MAP) and the authentication of users via SIM (subscriber identity module) cards. Unlike EDGE (IMT Single-Carrier, based on GSM) and CDMA2000 (IMT Multi-Carrier), UMTS requires new base stations and new frequency allocations. UMTS has since been enhanced as High Speed Packet Access (HSPA).

== Features ==
UMTS supports theoretical maximum data transfer rates of 42 Mbit/s when Evolved HSPA (HSPA+) is implemented in the network. Users in deployed networks can expect a transfer rate of up to 384 kbit/s for Release '99 (R99) handsets (the original UMTS release), and 7.2 Mbit/s for High-Speed Downlink Packet Access (HSDPA) handsets in the downlink connection. These speeds are significantly faster than the 9.6 kbit/s of a single GSM error-corrected circuit switched data channel, multiple 9.6 kbit/s channels in High-Speed Circuit-Switched Data (HSCSD) and 14.4 kbit/s for CDMAOne channels.

Since 2006, UMTS networks in many countries have been or are in the process of being upgraded with High-Speed Downlink Packet Access (HSDPA), sometimes known as 3.5G. Currently, HSDPA enables downlink transfer speeds of up to 21 Mbit/s. Work is also progressing on improving the uplink transfer speed with the High-Speed Uplink Packet Access (HSUPA). The 3GPP LTE standard succeeds UMTS and initially provided 4G speeds of 100 Mbit/s down and 50 Mbit/s up, with scalability up to 3 Gbit/s, using a next generation air interface technology based upon orthogonal frequency-division multiplexing.

The first national consumer UMTS networks launched in 2002 with a heavy emphasis on telco-provided mobile applications such as mobile TV and video calling. The high data speeds of UMTS are now most often utilised for Internet access: experience in Japan and elsewhere has shown that user demand for video calls is not high, and telco-provided audio/video content has declined in popularity in favour of high-speed access to the World Wide Web – either directly on a handset or connected to a computer via Wi-Fi, Bluetooth or USB.

== Air interfaces ==
UMTS network architecture

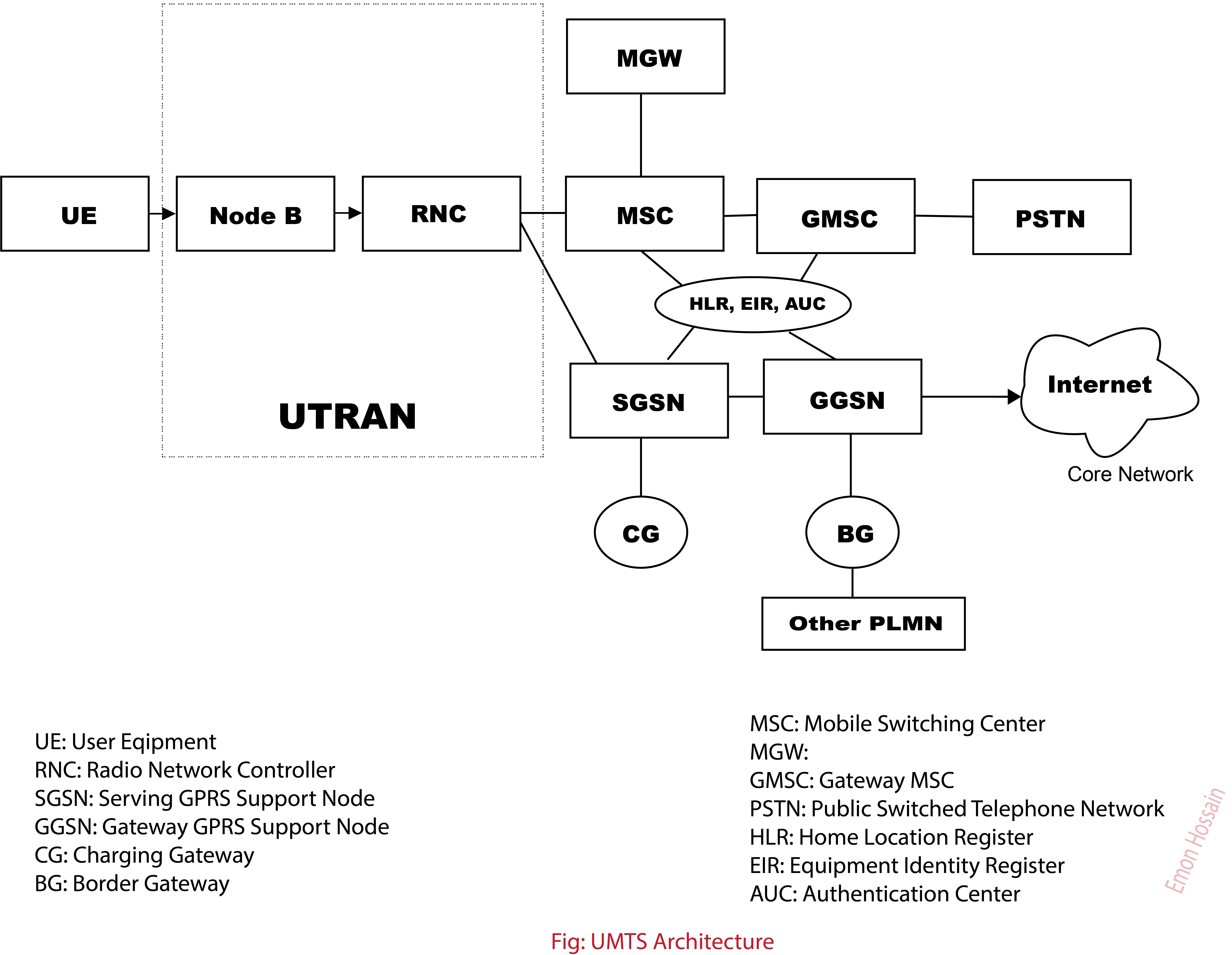
UMTS network architecture

UMTS combines three different terrestrial air interfaces, GSM's Mobile Application Part (MAP) core, and the GSM family of speech codecs.

The air interfaces are called UMTS Terrestrial Radio Access (UTRA). All air interface options are part of ITU's IMT-2000. In the currently most popular variant for cellular mobile telephones, W-CDMA (IMT Direct Spread) is used. It is also called "Uu interface", as it links User Equipment to the UMTS Terrestrial Radio Access Network.

The terms W-CDMA, TD-CDMA and TD-SCDMA are misleading. While they suggest just a channel access method (namely a variant of CDMA), they are actually the common names for the whole air interface standards.

=== W-CDMA (UTRA-FDD) ===
W-CDMA (WCDMA; Wideband Code-Division Multiple Access), along with UMTS-FDD, UTRA-FDD, or IMT-2000 CDMA Direct Spread is an air interface standard found in 3G mobile telecommunications networks. It supports conventional cellular voice, text and MMS services, but can also carry data at high speeds, allowing mobile operators to deliver higher bandwidth applications including streaming and broadband Internet access.

W-CDMA uses the DS-CDMA channel access method with a pair of 5 MHz wide channels. In contrast, the competing CDMA2000 system uses one or more available 1.25 MHz channels for each direction of communication. W-CDMA systems are widely criticized for their large spectrum usage, which delayed deployment in countries that acted relatively slowly in allocating new frequencies specifically for 3G services (such as the United States).

The specific frequency bands originally defined by the UMTS standard are 1885–2025 MHz for the mobile-to-base (uplink) and 2110–2200 MHz for the base-to-mobile (downlink). In the US, 1710–1755 MHz and 2110–2155 MHz are used instead, as the 1900 MHz band was already used. While UMTS2100 is the most widely deployed UMTS band, some countries' UMTS operators use the 850 MHz (900 MHz in Europe) and/or 1900 MHz bands (independently, meaning uplink and downlink are within the same band), notably in the US by AT&T Mobility, New Zealand by Telecom New Zealand on the XT Mobile Network and in Australia by Telstra on the Next G network. Some carriers such as T-Mobile use band numbers to identify the UMTS frequencies. For example, Band I (2100 MHz), Band IV (1700/2100 MHz), and Band V (850 MHz).

UMTS-FDD is an acronym for Universal Mobile Telecommunications System (UMTS) – frequency-division duplexing (FDD) and a 3GPP standardized version of UMTS networks that makes use of frequency-division duplexing for duplexing over an UMTS Terrestrial Radio Access (UTRA) air interface.

W-CDMA is the basis of Japan's NTT DoCoMo's FOMA service and the most-commonly used member of the Universal Mobile Telecommunications System (UMTS) family and sometimes used as a synonym for UMTS. It uses the DS-CDMA channel access method and the FDD duplexing method to achieve higher speeds and support more users compared to most previously used time-division multiple access (TDMA) and time-division duplex (TDD) schemes.

While not an evolutionary upgrade on the airside, it uses the same core network as the 2G GSM networks deployed worldwide, allowing dual-mode mobile operation along with GSM/EDGE; a feature it shares with other members of the UMTS family.

==== Development ====
In the late 1990s, W-CDMA was developed by NTT DoCoMo as the air interface for their 3G network FOMA. Later NTT DoCoMo submitted the specification to the International Telecommunication Union (ITU) as a candidate for the international 3G standard known as IMT-2000. The ITU eventually accepted W-CDMA as part of the IMT-2000 family of 3G standards, as an alternative to CDMA2000, EDGE, and the short range DECT system. Later, W-CDMA was selected as an air interface for UMTS.

As NTT DoCoMo did not wait for the finalisation of the 3G Release 99 specification, their network was initially incompatible with UMTS. However, this has been resolved by NTT DoCoMo updating their network.

Code-Division Multiple Access communication networks have been developed by a number of companies over the years, but development of cell-phone networks based on CDMA (prior to W-CDMA) was dominated by Qualcomm, the first company to succeed in developing a practical and cost-effective CDMA implementation for consumer cell phones and its early IS-95 air interface standard has evolved into the current CDMA2000 (IS-856/IS-2000) standard. Qualcomm created an experimental wideband CDMA system called CDMA2000 3x which unified the W-CDMA (3GPP) and CDMA2000 (3GPP2) network technologies into a single design for a worldwide standard air interface. Compatibility with CDMA2000 would have beneficially enabled roaming on existing networks beyond Japan, since Qualcomm CDMA2000 networks are widely deployed, especially in the Americas, with coverage in 58 countries as of 2006. However, divergent requirements resulted in the W-CDMA standard being retained and deployed globally. W-CDMA has then become the dominant technology with 457 commercial networks in 178 countries as of April 2012. Several CDMA2000 operators have even converted their networks to W-CDMA for international roaming compatibility and smooth upgrade path to LTE.

Despite incompatibility with existing air-interface standards, late introduction and the high upgrade cost of deploying an all-new transmitter technology, W-CDMA has become the dominant standard.

==== Rationale for W-CDMA ====
W-CDMA transmits on a pair of 5 MHz-wide radio channels, while CDMA2000 transmits on one or several pairs of 1.25 MHz radio channels. Though W-CDMA does use a direct-sequence CDMA transmission technique like CDMA2000, W-CDMA is not simply a wideband version of CDMA2000 and differs in many aspects from CDMA2000. From an engineering point of view, W-CDMA provides a different balance of trade-offs between cost, capacity, performance, and density; it also promises to achieve a benefit of reduced cost for video phone handsets. W-CDMA may also be better suited for deployment in the very dense cities of Europe and Asia. However, hurdles remain, and cross-licensing of patents between Qualcomm and W-CDMA vendors has not eliminated possible patent issues due to the features of W-CDMA which remain covered by Qualcomm patents.

W-CDMA has been developed into a complete set of specifications, a detailed protocol that defines how a mobile phone communicates with the tower, how signals are modulated, how datagrams are structured, and system interfaces are specified allowing free competition on technology elements.

==== Deployment ====
The world's first commercial W-CDMA service, FOMA, was launched by NTT DoCoMo in Japan in 2001.

Elsewhere, W-CDMA deployments are usually marketed under the UMTS brand.

W-CDMA has also been adapted for use in satellite communications on the U.S. Mobile User Objective System using geosynchronous satellites in place of cell towers.

J-Phone Japan (once Vodafone and now SoftBank Mobile) soon followed by launching their own W-CDMA based service, originally branded "Vodafone Global Standard" and claiming UMTS compatibility. The name of the service was changed to "Vodafone 3G" (now "SoftBank 3G") in December 2004.

Beginning in 2003, Hutchison Whampoa gradually launched their upstart UMTS networks.

Most countries have, since the ITU approved of the 3G mobile service, either "auctioned" the radio frequencies to the company willing to pay the most, or conducted a "beauty contest" – asking the various companies to present what they intend to commit to if awarded the licences. This strategy has been criticised for aiming to drain the cash of operators to the brink of bankruptcy in order to honour their bids or proposals. Most of them have a time constraint for the rollout of the service – where a certain "coverage" must be achieved within a given date or the licence will be revoked.

Vodafone launched several UMTS networks in Europe in February 2004. MobileOne of Singapore commercially launched its 3G (W-CDMA) services in February 2005. New Zealand in August 2005 and Australia in October 2005.

AT&T Mobility utilized a UMTS network, with HSPA+, from 2005 until its shutdown in February 2022.

Rogers in Canada March 2007 has launched HSDPA in the Toronto Golden Horseshoe district on W-CDMA at 850/1900 MHz and plan the launch the service commercial in the top 25 cities October, 2007.

TeliaSonera opened W-CDMA service in Finland October 13, 2004, with speeds up to 384 kbit/s. Availability only in main cities. Pricing is approx. €2/MB.

SK Telecom and KTF, two largest mobile phone service providers in South Korea, have each started offering W-CDMA service in December 2003. Due to poor coverage and lack of choice in handhelds, the W-CDMA service has barely made a dent in the Korean market which was dominated by CDMA2000. By October 2006 both companies are covering more than 90 cities while SK Telecom has announced that it will provide nationwide coverage for its WCDMA network in order for it to offer SBSM (Single Band Single Mode) handsets by the first half of 2007. KT Freecel will thus cut funding to its CDMA2000 network development to the minimum.

In Norway, Telenor introduced W-CDMA in major cities by the end of 2004, while their competitor, NetCom, followed suit a few months later. Both operators have 98% national coverage on EDGE, but Telenor has parallel WLAN roaming networks on GSM, where the UMTS service is competing with this. For this reason Telenor is dropping support of their WLAN service in Austria (2006).

Maxis Communications and Celcom, two mobile phone service providers in Malaysia, started offering W-CDMA services in 2005.

In Sweden, Telia introduced W-CDMA in March 2004.

=== UTRA-TDD ===
UMTS-TDD, an acronym for Universal Mobile Telecommunications System (UMTS) – time-division duplexing (TDD), is a 3GPP standardized version of UMTS networks that use UTRA-TDD. UTRA-TDD is a UTRA that uses time-division duplexing for duplexing. While a full implementation of UMTS, it is mainly used to provide Internet access in circumstances similar to those where WiMAX might be used. UMTS-TDD is not directly compatible with UMTS-FDD: a device designed to use one standard cannot, unless specifically designed to, work on the other, because of the difference in air interface technologies and frequencies used. It is more formally as IMT-2000 CDMA-TDD or IMT 2000 Time-Division (IMT-TD).

The two UMTS air interfaces (UTRAs) for UMTS-TDD are TD-CDMA and TD-SCDMA. Both air interfaces use a combination of two channel access methods, code-division multiple access (CDMA) and time-division multiple access (TDMA): the frequency band is divided into time slots (TDMA), which are further divided into channels using CDMA spreading codes. These air interfaces are classified as TDD, because time slots can be allocated to either uplink or downlink traffic.

==== TD-CDMA (UTRA-TDD 3.84 Mcps High Chip Rate (HCR)) ====
TD-CDMA, an acronym for Time-Division-Code-Division Multiple Access, is a channel-access method based on using spread-spectrum multiple-access (CDMA) across multiple time slots (TDMA). TD-CDMA is the channel access method for UTRA-TDD HCR, which is an acronym for UMTS Terrestrial Radio Access-Time Division Duplex High Chip Rate.

UMTS-TDD's air interfaces that use the TD-CDMA channel access technique are standardized as UTRA-TDD HCR, which uses increments of 5 MHz of spectrum, each slice divided into 10 ms frames containing fifteen time slots (1500 per second). The time slots (TS) are allocated in fixed percentage for downlink and uplink. TD-CDMA is used to multiplex streams from or to multiple transceivers. Unlike W-CDMA, it does not need separate frequency bands for up- and downstream, allowing deployment in tight frequency bands.

TD-CDMA is a part of IMT-2000, defined as IMT-TD Time-Division (IMT CDMA TDD), and is one of the three UMTS air interfaces (UTRAs), as standardized by the 3GPP in UTRA-TDD HCR. UTRA-TDD HCR is closely related to W-CDMA, and provides the same types of channels where possible. UMTS's HSDPA/HSUPA enhancements are also implemented under TD-CDMA.

In the United States, the technology has been used for public safety and government use in the New York City and a few other areas. In Japan, IPMobile planned to provide TD-CDMA service in year 2006, but it was delayed, changed to TD-SCDMA, and bankrupt before the service officially started.

==== TD-SCDMA (UTRA-TDD 1.28 Mcps Low Chip Rate (LCR)) ====
Time-Division Synchronous Code-Division Multiple Access (TD-SCDMA) or UTRA TDD 1.28 Mcps low chip rate (UTRA-TDD LCR) is an air interface found in UMTS mobile telecommunications networks in China as an alternative to W-CDMA.

TD-SCDMA uses the TDMA channel access method combined with an adaptive synchronous CDMA component on 1.6 MHz slices of spectrum, allowing deployment in even tighter frequency bands than TD-CDMA. It is standardized by the 3GPP and also referred to as "UTRA-TDD LCR". However, the main incentive for development of this Chinese-developed standard was avoiding or reducing the license fees that have to be paid to non-Chinese patent owners. Unlike the other air interfaces, TD-SCDMA was not part of UMTS from the beginning but has been added in Release 4 of the specification.

Like TD-CDMA, TD-SCDMA is known as IMT CDMA TDD within IMT-2000.

The term "TD-SCDMA" is misleading. While it suggests covering only a channel access method, it is actually the common name for the whole air interface specification.

TD-SCDMA / UMTS-TDD (LCR) networks are incompatible with W-CDMA / UMTS-FDD and TD-CDMA / UMTS-TDD (HCR) networks.

===== Objectives =====
TD-SCDMA was developed in the People's Republic of China by the Chinese Academy of Telecommunications Technology (CATT), Datang Telecom and Siemens in an attempt to avoid dependence on Western technology. This is likely primarily for practical reasons, since other 3G formats require the payment of patent fees to a large number of Western patent holders.

TD-SCDMA proponents also claim it is better suited for densely populated areas. Further, it is supposed to cover all usage scenarios, whereas W-CDMA is optimised for symmetric traffic and macro cells, while TD-CDMA is best used in low mobility scenarios within micro or pico cells.

TD-SCDMA is based on spread-spectrum technology which makes it unlikely that it will be able to completely escape the payment of license fees to western patent holders. The launch of a national TD-SCDMA network was initially projected by 2005 but only reached large scale commercial trials with 60,000 users across eight cities in 2008.

On January 7, 2009, China granted a TD-SCDMA 3G licence to China Mobile.

On September 21, 2009, China Mobile officially announced that it had 1,327,000 TD-SCDMA subscribers as of the end of August, 2009.

TD-SCDMA is not commonly used outside of China.

===== Technical highlights =====
TD-SCDMA uses TDD, in contrast to the FDD scheme used by W-CDMA. By dynamically adjusting the number of timeslots used for downlink and uplink, the system can more easily accommodate asymmetric traffic with different data rate requirements on downlink and uplink than FDD schemes. Since it does not require paired spectrum for downlink and uplink, spectrum allocation flexibility is also increased. Using the same carrier frequency for uplink and downlink also means that the channel condition is the same on both directions, and the base station can deduce the downlink channel information from uplink channel estimates, which is helpful to the application of beamforming techniques.

TD-SCDMA also uses TDMA in addition to the CDMA used in WCDMA. This reduces the number of users in each timeslot, which reduces the implementation complexity of multiuser detection and beamforming schemes, but the non-continuous transmission also reduces coverage (because of the higher peak power needed), mobility (because of lower power control frequency) and complicates radio resource management algorithms.

The "S" in TD-SCDMA stands for "synchronous", which means that uplink signals are synchronized at the base station receiver, achieved by continuous timing adjustments. This reduces the interference between users of the same timeslot using different codes by improving the orthogonality between the codes, therefore increasing system capacity, at the cost of some hardware complexity in achieving uplink synchronization.

===== History =====
On January 20, 2006, Ministry of Information Industry of the People's Republic of China formally announced that TD-SCDMA is the country's standard of 3G mobile telecommunication. On February 15, 2006, a timeline for deployment of the network in China was announced, stating pre-commercial trials would take place starting after completion of a number of test networks in select cities. These trials ran from March to October, 2006, but the results were apparently unsatisfactory. In early 2007, the Chinese government instructed the dominant cellular carrier, China Mobile, to build commercial trial networks in eight cities, and the two fixed-line carriers, China Telecom and China Netcom, to build one each in two other cities. Construction of these trial networks was scheduled to finish during the fourth quarter of 2007, but delays meant that construction was not complete until early 2008.

The standard has been adopted by 3GPP since Rel-4, known as "UTRA TDD 1.28 Mcps Option".

On March 28, 2008, China Mobile Group announced TD-SCDMA "commercial trials" for 60,000 test users in eight cities from April 1, 2008. Networks using other 3G standards (WCDMA and CDMA2000 EV/DO) had still not been launched in China, as these were delayed until TD-SCDMA was ready for commercial launch.

In January 2009, the Ministry of Industry and Information Technology (MIIT) in China took the unusual step of assigning licences for 3 different third-generation mobile phone standards to three carriers in a long-awaited step that is expected to prompt $41 billion in spending on new equipment. The Chinese-developed standard, TD-SCDMA, was assigned to China Mobile, the world's biggest phone carrier by subscribers. That appeared to be an effort to make sure the new system has the financial and technical backing to succeed. Licences for two existing 3G standards, W-CDMA and CDMA2000 1xEV-DO, were assigned to China Unicom and China Telecom, respectively. Third-generation, or 3G, technology supports Web surfing, wireless video and other services and the start of service is expected to spur new revenue growth.

The technical split by MIIT has hampered the performance of China Mobile in the 3G market, with users and China Mobile engineers alike pointing to the lack of suitable handsets to use on the network. Deployment of base stations has also been slow, resulting in lack of improvement of service for users. The network connection itself has consistently been slower than that from the other two carriers, leading to a sharp decline in market share. By 2011 China Mobile has already moved its focus onto TD-LTE. Gradual closures of TD-SCDMA stations started in 2016.

===== Frequency bands & Deployments =====
The following is a list of mobile telecommunications networks using third-generation TD-SCDMA / UMTS-TDD (LCR) technology.

Operator	Country	Frequency (MHz)	Band	Launch date	Notes
China Mobile	China	2100	A+ (Band 34)	Jan 2009	(↓↑) 2010–2025 MHz; Network is being phased out and is to be shutdown by 2025.
China Mobile	China	1900	A− (Band 33)	Jan 2009 - Dec 2013	(↓↑) 1900–1920 MHz (Subset of Band 39); Network upgraded to TDD-LTE (B39) via RRU Software Update.
none	China	1900	F (Band 39)	N/A	(↓↑) 1880–1920 MHz; No deployments, later used for TD-LTE instead. Upper half previously used by Xiaolingtong (PHS)
China Mobile	China	2300	E (Band 40)	Jan 2009 - Dec 2013	(↓↑) 2300–2400 MHz; Network upgraded to TDD-LTE (B40) via RRU Software Update.

==== Unlicensed UMTS-TDD ====
In Europe, CEPT allocated the 2010–2020 MHz range for a variant of UMTS-TDD designed for unlicensed, self-provided use. Some telecom groups and jurisdictions have proposed withdrawing this service in favour of licensed UMTS-TDD, due to lack of demand, and lack of development of a UMTS TDD air interface technology suitable for deployment in this band.

==== Comparison with UMTS-FDD ====
Ordinary UMTS uses UTRA-FDD as an air interface and is known as UMTS-FDD. UMTS-FDD uses W-CDMA for multiple access and frequency-division duplex for duplexing, meaning that the up-link and down-link transmit on different frequencies. UMTS is usually transmitted on frequencies assigned for 1G, 2G, or 3G mobile telephone service in the countries of operation.

UMTS-TDD uses time-division duplexing, allowing the up-link and down-link to share the same spectrum. This allows the operator to more flexibly divide the usage of available spectrum according to traffic patterns. For ordinary phone service, you would expect the up-link and down-link to carry approximately equal amounts of data (because every phone call needs a voice transmission in either direction), but Internet-oriented traffic is more frequently one-way. For example, when browsing a website, the user will send commands, which are short, to the server, but the server will send whole files, that are generally larger than those commands, in response.

UMTS-TDD tends to be allocated frequency intended for mobile/wireless Internet services rather than used on existing cellular frequencies. This is, in part, because TDD duplexing is not normally allowed on cellular, PCS/PCN, and 3G frequencies. TDD technologies open up the usage of left-over unpaired spectrum.

Europe-wide, several bands are provided either specifically for UMTS-TDD or for similar technologies. These are 1900 MHz and 1920 MHz and between 2010 MHz and 2025 MHz. In several countries the 2500–2690 MHz band (also known as MMDS in the USA) have been used for UMTS-TDD deployments. Additionally, spectrum around the 3.5 GHz range has been allocated in some countries, notably Britain, in a technology-neutral environment. In the Czech Republic UTMS-TDD is also used in a frequency range around 872 MHz.

==== Deployment ====
UMTS-TDD has been deployed for public and/or private networks in at least nineteen countries around the world, with live systems in, amongst other countries, Australia, Czech Republic, France, Germany, Japan, New Zealand, Botswana, South Africa, the UK, and the USA.

Deployments in the US thus far have been limited. It has been selected for a public safety support network used by emergency responders in New York, but outside of some experimental systems, notably one from Nextel, thus far the WiMAX standard appears to have gained greater traction as a general mobile Internet access system.

==== Competing standards ====
A variety of Internet-access systems exist which provide broadband speed access to the net. These include WiMAX and HIPERMAN. UMTS-TDD has the advantages of being able to use an operator's existing UMTS/GSM infrastructure, should it have one, and that it includes UMTS modes optimized for circuit switching should, for example, the operator want to offer telephone service. UMTS-TDD's performance is also more consistent. However, UMTS-TDD deployers often have regulatory problems with taking advantage of some of the services UMTS compatibility provides. For example, the UMTS-TDD spectrum in the UK cannot be used to provide telephone service, though the regulator OFCOM is discussing the possibility of allowing it at some point in the future. Few operators considering UMTS-TDD have existing UMTS/GSM infrastructure.

Additionally, the WiMAX and HIPERMAN systems provide significantly larger bandwidths when the mobile station is near the tower.

Like most mobile Internet access systems, many users who might otherwise choose UMTS-TDD will find their needs covered by the ad hoc collection of unconnected Wi-Fi access points at many restaurants and transportation hubs, and/or by Internet access already provided by their mobile phone operator. By comparison, UMTS-TDD (and systems like WiMAX) offers mobile, and more consistent, access than the former, and generally faster access than the latter.

== Radio access network ==
UMTS also specifies the Universal Terrestrial Radio Access Network (UTRAN), which is composed of multiple base stations, possibly using different terrestrial air interface standards and frequency bands.

UMTS and GSM/EDGE can share a Core Network (CN), making UTRAN an alternative radio access network to GERAN (GSM/EDGE RAN), and allowing (mostly) transparent switching between the RANs according to available coverage and service needs. Because of that, UMTS's and GSM/EDGE's radio access networks are sometimes collectively referred to as UTRAN/GERAN.

UMTS networks are often combined with GSM/EDGE, the latter of which is also a part of IMT-2000.

The UE (User Equipment) interface of the RAN (Radio Access Network) primarily consists of RRC (Radio Resource Control), PDCP (Packet Data Convergence Protocol), RLC (Radio Link Control) and MAC (Media Access Control) protocols. RRC protocol handles connection establishment, measurements, radio bearer services, security and handover decisions. RLC protocol primarily divides into three Modes – Transparent Mode (TM), Unacknowledge Mode (UM), Acknowledge Mode (AM). The functionality of AM entity resembles TCP operation whereas UM operation resembles UDP operation. In TM mode, data will be sent to lower layers without adding any header to SDU of higher layers. MAC handles the scheduling of data on air interface depending on higher layer (RRC) configured parameters.

The set of properties related to data transmission is called Radio Bearer (RB). This set of properties decides the maximum allowed data in a TTI (Transmission Time Interval). RB includes RLC information and RB mapping. RB mapping decides the mapping between RB<->logical channel<->transport channel. Signaling messages are sent on Signaling Radio Bearers (SRBs) and data packets (either CS or PS) are sent on data RBs. RRC and NAS messages go on SRBs.

Security includes two procedures: integrity and ciphering. Integrity validates the resource of messages and also makes sure that no one (third/unknown party) on the radio interface has modified the messages. Ciphering ensures that no one listens to your data on the air interface. Both integrity and ciphering are applied for SRBs whereas only ciphering is applied for data RBs.

== Core network ==
With Mobile Application Part, UMTS uses the same core network standard as GSM/EDGE. This allows a simple migration for existing GSM operators. However, the migration path to UMTS is still costly: while much of the core infrastructure is shared with GSM, the cost of obtaining new spectrum licenses and overlaying UMTS at existing towers is high.

The CN can be connected to various backbone networks, such as the Internet or an Integrated Services Digital Network (ISDN) telephone network. UMTS (and GERAN) include the three lowest layers of OSI model. The network layer (OSI 3) includes the Radio Resource Management protocol (RRM) that manages the bearer channels between the mobile terminals and the fixed network, including the handovers.

== Frequency bands and channel bandwidths ==
=== UARFCN ===
A UARFCN (abbreviation for UTRA Absolute Radio Frequency Channel Number, where UTRA stands for UMTS Terrestrial Radio Access) is used to identify a frequency in the UMTS frequency bands.

Typically channel number is derived from the frequency in MHz through the formula Channel Number = Frequency * 5. However, this is only able to represent channels that are centered on a multiple of 200 kHz, which do not align with licensing in North America. 3GPP added several special values for the common North American channels.

=== Spectrum allocation ===
Over 130 licenses had been awarded to operators worldwide, as of December 2004, specifying W-CDMA radio access technology that builds on GSM. In Europe, the license process occurred at the tail end of the technology bubble, and the auction mechanisms for allocation set up in some countries resulted in some extremely high prices being paid for the original 2100 MHz licenses, notably in the UK and Germany. In Germany, bidders paid a total €50.8 billion for six licenses, two of which were subsequently abandoned and written off by their purchasers (Mobilcom and the Sonera/Telefónica consortium). It has been suggested that these huge license fees have the character of a very large tax paid on future income expected many years down the road. In any event, the high prices paid put some European telecom operators close to bankruptcy (most notably KPN). Over the last few years some operators have written off some or all of the license costs. Between 2007 and 2009, all three Finnish carriers began to use 900 MHz UMTS in a shared arrangement with its surrounding 2G GSM base stations for rural area coverage, a trend that is expected to expand over Europe in the next 1–3 years.

The 2100 MHz band (downlink around 2100 MHz and uplink around 1900 MHz) allocated for UMTS in Europe and most of Asia is already used in North America. The 1900 MHz range is used for 2G (PCS) services, and 2100 MHz range is used for satellite communications. Regulators have, however, freed up some of the 2100 MHz range for 3G services, together with a different range around 1700 MHz for the uplink.

AT&T Wireless launched UMTS services in the United States by the end of 2004 strictly using the existing 1900 MHz spectrum allocated for 2G PCS services. Cingular acquired AT&T Wireless in 2004 and has since then launched UMTS in select US cities. Cingular renamed itself AT&T Mobility and rolled out some cities with a UMTS network at 850 MHz to enhance its existing UMTS network at 1900 MHz and now offers subscribers a number of dual-band UMTS 850/1900 phones.

T-Mobile's rollout of UMTS in the US was originally focused on the 1700 MHz band. However, T-Mobile has been moving users from 1700 MHz to 1900 MHz (PCS) in order to reallocate the spectrum to 4G LTE services.

In Canada, UMTS coverage is being provided on the 850 MHz and 1900 MHz bands on the Rogers and Bell-Telus networks. Bell and Telus share the network. Recently, new providers Wind Mobile, Mobilicity and Videotron have begun operations in the 1700 MHz band.

In 2008, Australian telco Telstra replaced its existing CDMA network with a national UMTS-based 3G network, branded as NextG, operating in the 850 MHz band. Telstra currently provides UMTS service on this network, and also on the 2100 MHz UMTS network, through a co-ownership of the owning and administrating company 3GIS. This company is also co-owned by Hutchison 3G Australia, and this is the primary network used by their customers. Optus is currently rolling out a 3G network operating on the 2100 MHz band in cities and most large towns, and the 900 MHz band in regional areas. Vodafone is also building a 3G network using the 900 MHz band.

In India, BSNL has started its 3G services since October 2009, beginning with the larger cities and then expanding over to smaller cities. The 850 MHz and 900 MHz bands provide greater coverage compared to equivalent 1700/1900/2100 MHz networks, and are best suited to regional areas where greater distances separate base station and subscriber.

Carriers in South America are now also rolling out 850 MHz networks.

== Interoperability and global roaming ==
UMTS phones (and data cards) are highly portable – they have been designed to roam easily onto other UMTS networks (if the providers have roaming agreements in place). In addition, almost all UMTS phones are UMTS/GSM dual-mode devices, so if a UMTS phone travels outside of UMTS coverage during a call the call may be transparently handed off to available GSM coverage. Roaming charges are usually significantly higher than regular usage charges.

Most UMTS licensees consider ubiquitous, transparent global roaming an important issue. To enable a high degree of interoperability, UMTS phones usually support several different frequencies in addition to their GSM fallback. Different countries support different UMTS frequency bands – Europe initially used 2100 MHz while the most carriers in the USA use 850 MHz and 1900 MHz. T-Mobile has launched a network in the US operating at 1700 MHz (uplink) /2100 MHz (downlink), and these bands also have been adopted elsewhere in the US and in Canada and Latin America. A UMTS phone and network must support a common frequency to work together. Because of the frequencies used, early models of UMTS phones designated for the United States will likely not be operable elsewhere and vice versa. There are now 11 different frequency combinations used around the world – including frequencies formerly used solely for 2G services.

UMTS phones can use a Universal Subscriber Identity Module, USIM (based on GSM's SIM card) and also work (including UMTS services) with GSM SIM cards. This is a global standard of identification, and enables a network to identify and authenticate the (U)SIM in the phone. Roaming agreements between networks allow for calls to a customer to be redirected to them while roaming and determine the services (and prices) available to the user. In addition to user subscriber information and authentication information, the (U)SIM provides storage space for phone book contact. Handsets can store their data on their own memory or on the (U)SIM card (which is usually more limited in its phone book contact information). A (U)SIM can be moved to another UMTS or GSM phone, and the phone will take on the user details of the (U)SIM, meaning it is the (U)SIM (not the phone) which determines the phone number of the phone and the billing for calls made from the phone.

Japan was the first country to adopt 3G technologies, and since they had not used GSM previously they had no need to build GSM compatibility into their handsets and their 3G handsets were smaller than those available elsewhere. In 2002, NTT DoCoMo's FOMA 3G network was the first commercial UMTS network – using a pre-release specification, it was initially incompatible with the UMTS standard at the radio level but used standard USIM cards, meaning USIM card based roaming was possible (transferring the USIM card into a UMTS or GSM phone when travelling). Both NTT DoCoMo and SoftBank Mobile (which launched 3G in December 2002) now use standard UMTS.

=== Handsets and modems ===
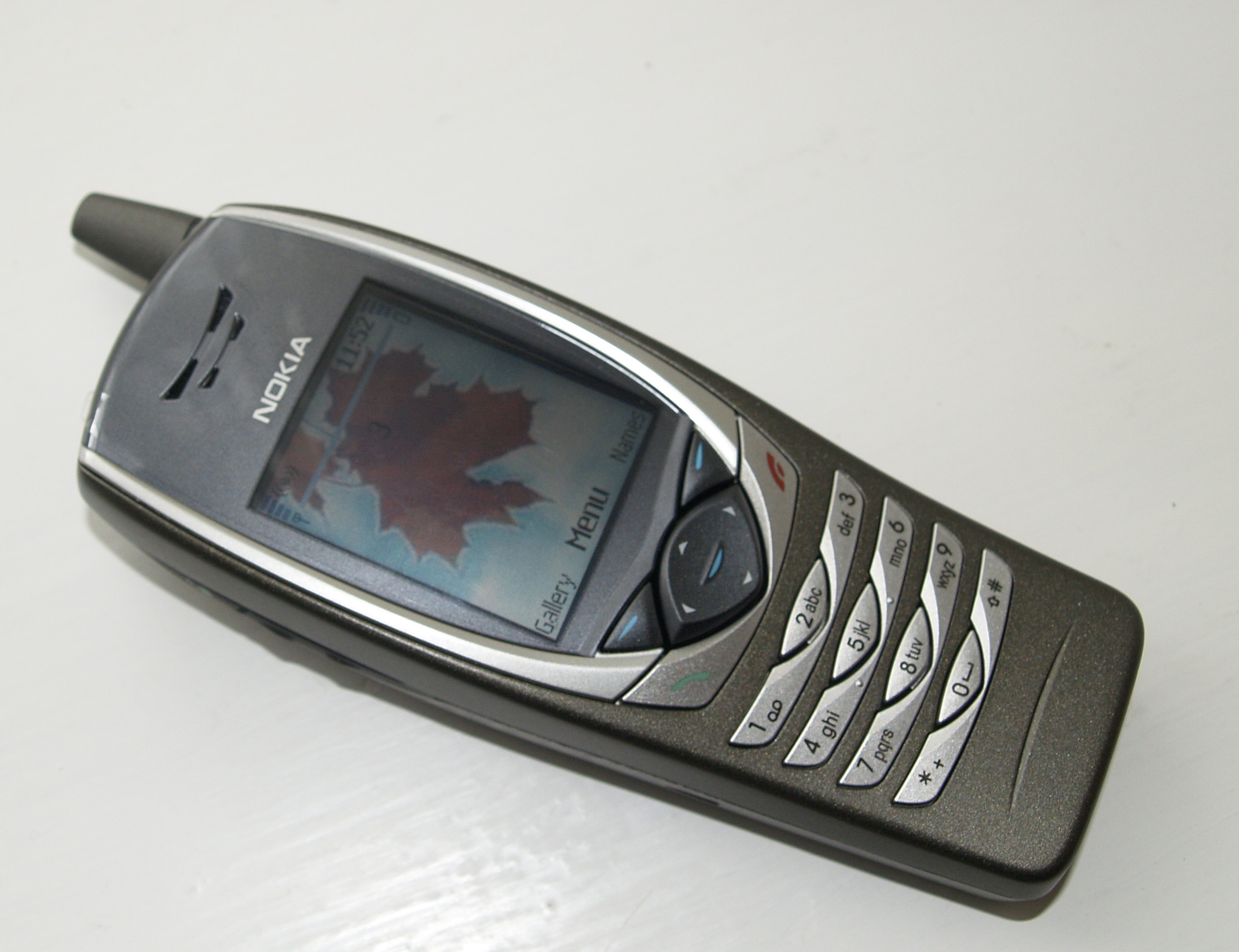
The Nokia 6650, an early (2003) UMTS handset

Most major 2G phone manufacturers were also manufacturers of 3G phones. The early 3G handsets and modems were specific to the frequencies required in their country, which meant they could only roam to other countries on the same 3G frequency (though they can fall back to the older GSM standard, where still provided). Canada and USA have a common share of frequencies, as do most European countries. The article UMTS frequency bands is an overview of UMTS network frequencies around the world.

Using a cellular router, PCMCIA or USB card, customers are able to access 3G broadband services, regardless of their choice of computer (such as a tablet PC or a PDA). Some software installs itself from the modem, so that in some cases absolutely no knowledge of technology is required to get online in moments. Using a phone that supports 3G and Bluetooth 2.0, multiple Bluetooth-capable laptops can be connected to the Internet. Some smartphones can also act as a mobile WLAN access point.

There are very few 3G phones or modems available supporting all 3G frequencies (UMTS850/900/1700/1900/2100 MHz). In 2010, Nokia released a range of phones with Pentaband 3G coverage, including the N8 and E7. Many other phones are offering more than one band which still enables extensive roaming. For example, Apple's iPhone 4 contains a quadband chipset operating on 850/900/1900/2100 MHz, allowing usage in the majority of countries where UMTS-FDD is deployed.

== Other competing standards ==
The main competitor to UMTS is CDMA2000 (IMT-MC), which is developed by the 3GPP2. Unlike UMTS, CDMA2000 is an evolutionary upgrade to an existing 2G standard, cdmaOne, and is able to operate within the same frequency allocations. This and CDMA2000's narrower bandwidth requirements make it easier to deploy in existing spectra. In some, but not all, cases, existing GSM operators only have enough spectrum to implement either UMTS or GSM, not both. For example, in the US D, E, and F PCS spectrum blocks, the amount of spectrum available is 5 MHz in each direction. A standard UMTS system would saturate that spectrum. Where CDMA2000 is deployed, it usually co-exists with UMTS. In many markets however, the co-existence issue is of little relevance, as legislative hurdles exist to co-deploying two standards in the same licensed slice of spectrum.

Another competitor to UMTS is EDGE (IMT-SC), which is an evolutionary upgrade to the 2G GSM system, leveraging existing GSM spectrums. It is also much easier, quicker, and considerably cheaper for wireless carriers to "bolt-on" EDGE functionality by upgrading their existing GSM transmission hardware to support EDGE rather than having to install almost all brand-new equipment to deliver UMTS. However, being developed by 3GPP just as UMTS, EDGE is not a true competitor. Instead, it is used as a temporary solution preceding UMTS roll-out or as a complement for rural areas. This is facilitated by the fact that GSM/EDGE and UMTS specifications are jointly developed and rely on the same core network, allowing dual-mode operation including vertical handovers.

China's TD-SCDMA standard is often seen as a competitor, too. TD-SCDMA has been added to UMTS' Release 4 as UTRA-TDD 1.28 Mcps Low Chip Rate (UTRA-TDD LCR). Unlike TD-CDMA (UTRA-TDD 3.84 Mcps High Chip Rate, UTRA-TDD HCR) which complements W-CDMA (UTRA-FDD), it is suitable for both micro and macrocells. However, the lack of vendors' support is preventing it from being a real competitor.

While DECT is technically capable of competing with UMTS and other cellular networks in densely populated, urban areas, it has only been deployed for domestic cordless phones and private in-house networks.

All of these competitors have been accepted by ITU as part of the IMT-2000 family of 3G standards, along with UMTS-FDD.

On the Internet access side, competing systems include WiMAX and Flash-OFDM.

== Migrating from GSM/GPRS to UMTS ==
From a GSM/GPRS network, the following network elements can be reused:

- Home Location Register (HLR)
- Visitor Location Register (VLR)
- Equipment Identity Register (EIR)
- Mobile Switching Center (MSC)
- Gateway Mobile Switching Center (GMSC)
- Authentication Center (AUC)
- Serving GPRS Support Node (SGSN)
- Gateway GPRS Support Node (GGSN)

From a GSM/GPRS communication radio network, the following elements cannot be reused:

- Base transceiver station (BTS)
- Base station controller (BSC)
- Packet Control Unit (PCU)

They can remain in the network and be used in dual network operation where 2G and 3G networks co-exist while network migration and new 3G terminals become available for use in the network.

The UMTS network introduces new network elements that function as specified by 3GPP:

- Node B (base transceiver station)
- Radio Network Controller (RNC)
- Media Gateway (MGW)

The functionality of MSC changes when going to UMTS. In a GSM system the MSC handles all the circuit switched operations like connecting A- and B-subscriber through the network. In UMTS the Media gateway (MGW) takes care of data transfer in circuit switched networks. MSC controls MGW operations.

== Problems and issues ==
Some countries, including the United States, have allocated spectrum differently from the ITU recommendations, so that the standard bands most commonly used for UMTS (UMTS-2100) have not been available. In those countries, alternative bands are used, preventing the interoperability of existing UMTS-2100 equipment, and requiring the design and manufacture of different equipment for the use in these markets. As is the case with GSM900 today, standard UMTS 2100 MHz equipment will not work in those markets. However, it appears as though UMTS is not suffering as much from handset band compatibility issues as GSM did, as many UMTS handsets are multi-band in both UMTS and GSM modes. Penta-band (850, 900, 1700, 2100, and 1900 MHz bands), quad-band GSM (850, 900, 1800, and 1900 MHz bands) and tri-band UMTS (850, 1900, and 2100 MHz bands) handsets are becoming more commonplace.

In its early days, UMTS had problems in many countries: Overweight handsets with poor battery life were first to arrive on a market highly sensitive to weight and form factor. The Motorola A830, a debut handset on Hutchison's 3 network, weighed more than 200 grams and even featured a detachable camera to reduce handset weight. Another significant issue involved call reliability, related to problems with handover from UMTS to GSM. Customers found their connections being dropped as handovers were possible only in one direction (UMTS → GSM), with the handset only changing back to UMTS after hanging up. In most networks around the world this is no longer an issue.

Compared to GSM, UMTS networks initially required a higher base station density. For fully-fledged UMTS incorporating video on demand features, one base station needed to be set up every 1–1.5 km (0.62–0.93 mi). This was the case when only the 2100 MHz band was being used, however with the growing use of lower-frequency bands (such as 850 and 900 MHz) this is no longer so. This has led to increasing rollout of the lower-band networks by operators since 2006.

Even with current technologies and low-band UMTS, telephony and data over UMTS requires more power than on comparable GSM networks. Apple Inc. cited UMTS power consumption as the reason that the first generation iPhone only supported EDGE. Their release of the iPhone 3G quotes talk time on UMTS as half that available when the handset is set to use GSM. Other manufacturers indicate different battery lifetime for UMTS mode compared to GSM mode as well. As battery and network technology improve, this issue is diminishing.

=== Security issues ===
As early as 2008, it was known that carrier networks can be used to surreptitiously gather user location information. In August 2014, the Washington Post reported on widespread marketing of surveillance systems using Signalling System No. 7 (SS7) protocols to locate callers anywhere in the world.

In December 2014, news broke that SS7's very own functions can be repurposed for surveillance, because of its relaxed security, in order to listen to calls in real time or to record encrypted calls and texts for later decryption, or to defraud users and cellular carriers.

Deutsche Telekom and Vodafone declared the same day that they had fixed gaps in their networks, but that the problem is global and can only be fixed with a telecommunication system-wide solution.

== Releases ==
The evolution of UMTS progresses according to planned releases. Each release is designed to introduce new features and improve upon existing ones.

=== Release '99 ===
- Bearer services
- 64 kbit/s circuit switch
- 384 kbit/s packet switched
- Location services
- Call service: compatible with Global System for Mobile Communications (GSM), based on Universal Subscriber Identity Module (USIM)
- Voice quality features – Tandem Free Operation
- Frequency 2.1 GHz

=== Release 4 ===
- Edge radio
- Multimedia messaging
- MExE (Mobile Execution Environment)
- Improved location services
- IP Multimedia Services (IMS)
- TD-SCDMA (UTRA-TDD 1.28 Mcps low chip rate)

=== Release 5 ===
- IP Multimedia Subsystem (IMS)
- IPv6, IP transport in UTRAN
- Improvements in GERAN, MExE, etc.
- HSDPA

=== Release 6 ===
- WLAN integration
- Multimedia broadcast and multicast
- Improvements in IMS
- HSUPA
- Fractional DPCH

=== Release 7 ===
- Enhanced L2
- 64 QAM, MIMO
- Voice over HSPA
- CPC – continuous packet connectivity
- FRLC – Flexible RLC

=== Release 8 ===
- Dual-Cell HSDPA

=== Release 9 ===
- Dual-Cell HSUPA

== See also ==
- List of UMTS networks
- Long Term Evolution, the 3GPP 4G successor for UMTS and CDMA2000.
- GAN/UMA: A standard for running GSM and UMTS over wireless LANs.
- Opportunity-Driven Multiple Access (ODMA): a UMTS TDD mode communications relaying protocol
- HSDPA, HSUPA: updates to the W-CDMA air interface.
- PDCP
- Subscriber Identity Module
- UMTS-TDD: a variant of UMTS largely used to provide wireless Internet service.
- UMTS frequency bands
- UMTS channels
- W-CDMA: the primary air interface standard used by UMTS.
- TD-SCDMA

=== Other, non-UMTS, 3G and 4G standards ===
- CDMA2000: evolved from cdmaOne (also known as IS-95 or "CDMA"), managed by the 3GPP2
- FOMA
- WiMAX
- GSM
- GPRS
- EDGE
- ETSI

=== Other information ===
- Cellular frequencies
- CDMA
- Comparison of wireless data standards
- DECT
- Dynamic TDMA
- Evolution-Data Optimized/CDMA2000
- FOMA
- GSM/EDGE
- HSPA
- PN sequences
- Spectral efficiency comparison table
- UMTS frequency bands
- WiMAX
- Telecommunications industry in China
- Communications in China
- Standardization in China
- Mobile modem
- Spectral efficiency comparison table
- Code-Division Multiple Access (CDMA)
- Common pilot channel or CPICH, a simple synchronisation channel in WCDMA.
- Multiple-input multiple-output (MIMO) is the major issue of multiple antenna research.
- Wi-Fi: a local area wireless technology that is complementary to UMTS.
- List of device bandwidths
- Operations and Maintenance Centre
- Radio Network Controller
- UMTS security
- Huawei SingleRAN: a RAN technology allowing migration from GSM to UMTS or simultaneous use of both

== Documentation ==
- 3GPP specification series 25 – Radio aspects of 3G, including UMTS
- TS 25.201 Physical Layer – General Description – Describes basic differences between FDD and TDD.
- TS 25.211 Physical channels and mapping of transport channels onto physical channels (FDD)
- TS 25.221 Physical channels and mapping of transport channels onto physical channels (TDD)
- TS 25.212 Multiplexing and channel coding (FDD)
- TS 25.222 Multiplexing and channel coding (TDD)
- TS 25.213 Spreading and modulation (FDD)
- TS 25.223 Spreading and modulation (TDD)
- TS 25.214 Physical layer procedures (FDD)
- TS 25.224 Physical layer procedures (TDD)
- TS 25.215 Physical layer – Measurements (FDD)
- TS 25.225 Physical layer – Measurements (TDD)
