= User equipment =

Term used in telecommunications standards

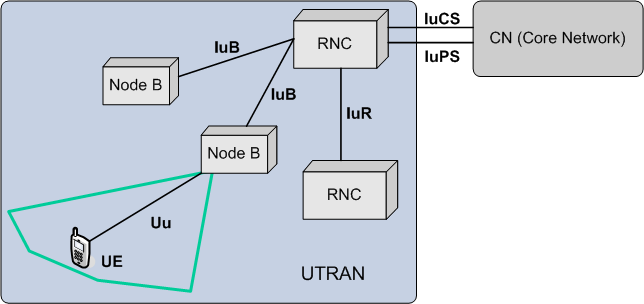
UMTS Radio Access Network

In the Universal Mobile Telecommunications System (UMTS) and 3GPP Long Term Evolution (LTE), user equipment (UE) is any device used directly by an end-user to communicate. It can be a hand-held telephone, a laptop computer equipped with a mobile broadband adapter, or any other device. It connects to the base station Node B/eNodeB as specified in the ETSI 125/136-series and 3GPP 25/36-series of specifications. It roughly corresponds to the mobile station (MS) in GSM systems.

The radio interface between the UE and the Node B is called Uu. In the context of UMTS (Universal Mobile Telecommunications System), Uu stands for the interface between UTRAN (UMTS Terrestrial Radio Access Network) and the UE (User Equipment).

== Functionality ==
UE handles the following tasks towards the core network:

- Mobility management
- Call control
- Session management
- Identity management

The corresponding protocols are transmitted transparently via a Node B, that is, Node B does not change, use or understand the information. These protocols are also referred to as Non Access Stratum protocols.

The UE is a device which initiates all the calls and it is the terminal device in a network.
