= Location area identity =

In mobile networks, location area identity (LAI) is a unique identifier assigned to each location area of a public land mobile network (PLMN).

== Overview ==
This internationally unique identifier is used for location updating of mobile subscribers. It is composed of a three decimal digit mobile country code (MCC), a two to three digit mobile network code (MNC) that identifies a Subscriber Module Public Land Mobile Network (SM PLMN) in that country, and a location area code (LAC) which is a 16 bit number with two special values, thereby allowing 65534 location areas within one GSM PLMN.

== Broadcast ==
The LAI is broadcast regularly through a broadcast control channel (BCCH). A mobile station (e.g. cell phone) recognizes the LAI and stores it in the subscriber identity module (SIM) card.

If the mobile station is moving and notices a change of LAI, it will issue a location update request, thereby informing the mobile provider of its new LAI. This allows the provider to locate the mobile station in case of an incoming call.

== See also ==
- Mobility management
- SIM Application Toolkit
- GPRS roaming exchange
