= TLLI =

Part of the GSM standard

The TLLI (Temporary Logical Link Identifier) is used in GSM and GPRS services. It provides the signaling address used for communication between the user equipment and the SGSN (Serving GPRS Support Node) and is specified in 3GPP specification 23.003.

The TLLI can be classified into four groups:

- Local TLLI: for normal operation between SGSN and user equipment.
- Foreign TLLI: primarily used when crossing a routing area boundary.
- Random TLLI: used for initial access or if the user equipment does not possess any of the above.
- Auxiliary TLLI: is selected by the SGSN but is not used as of now.
