= GTP =

GTP may refer to:

== Computing ==
- Go Text Protocol
- GPRS Tunnelling Protocol
- .gtp, a common Gerber file extension for top solder paste mask files

== Government ==
- Government Transformation Programme (Malaysia)
- Graduate Teacher Programme, in England and Wales
- Growth and Transformation Plan of the Government of Ethiopia

== Medicine and science ==
- Game transfer phenomena
- Guanosine triphosphate
- Good tissue practice
- Global Temperature change Potential

== Vehicles, Transport, Motorsport ==
- Grand Touring Prototype; the IMSA GTP, a race car category
  - 1st generation (1981–1993), see IMSA GTP
    - BMW GTP
    - Chevrolet Corvette GTP
    - Consulier GTP
    - Ford Mustang GTP
    - Mazda GTP
  - 2nd generation (2023–), see LMDh
- Grand Trunk Pacific Railway, a defunct Canadian railway
- Pontiac Grand Prix GTP
- Pontiac G6 GTP
- Sisu GTP, a Finnish military vehicle

== Other uses ==
- Global TransPark, in North Carolina, United States
- Global Tower Partners, an American telecommunications company

== See also ==
- Wikipedia:Getting to Philosophy
- GTP' (GTP Prime), a network protocol based on GPRS Tunnelling Protocol (GTP)
