= IPX (disambiguation) =

IPX is the Internetwork Packet Exchange, Novell's network protocol.

IPX may also refer to:

- IP exchange, GSM Association's protocol
- IPX, an IP code for ingress protection
- Hirose U.FL, a small coaxial connector form
- Interplanetary Expeditions, a fictional corporation in the television series Babylon 5
- iPhone X, 2017 flagship smartphone made by Apple
