= Procera Networks =

American networking equipment company

- Type: Privately held company
- Industry: Networking Hardware and Software
- Founded: 2002
- Headquarters: Fremont, California
- Key people: Lyndon Cantor (President and CEO); Richard Deggs, CFO; Alexander Haväng, Founder, Chief Technology Officer; Cam Cullen, VP of Global Marketing
- Website: www.proceranetworks.com

Logo of Netinact before merger

Procera Networks is a networking equipment company based in Fremont, California, United States, that designs and sells Network Intelligence solutions based on deep packet inspection (DPI) technology. Procera sells solutions to telecom operators, governments, enterprises, and network equipment vendors in the areas of Analytics, Traffic Management, Policy and Charging Control, and Service Provider Compliance.

== History ==
Procera was incorporated in 2002 in California by founder and original CEO Doug Glader. The company was initially created to deliver intelligent Ethernet network switches. The company changed its product line when it merged with Netintact, a company based in Varberg, Sweden, that offered bandwidth management products to Scandinavian network operators under the PacketLogic brand. The merger was announced in May and closed in June 2006. Procera shifted the company product strategy to the Netintact product lines.

From 2006 to 2008, Procera sold inexpensive (less than 2 Gbit/s) traffic management products to small operators and enterprises, to operators like Com Hem in Sweden. In September 2007, Procera Networks became listed on the American Stock Exchange with stock symbol PKT.

Beginning in 2008, Procera began focusing on larger carriers and mobile operators. Several customers reported they use Procera's technology, such as Yoigo and Genband, which resells Procera products as its P-Series products.

Procera was named one of the fastest growing network companies by Deloitte for 2010 and 2011 as part of its Deloitte Fast 500 study. On June 24, 2011, Procera Networks joined the Russell 3000 Index. In December 2011, Procera moved to the NASDAQ stock exchange using the symbol PKT.

In 2013, Procera bought Vineyard Networks, a Canadian DPI company for Can$28 million. The Vineyard product is sold on the market as Network Application Visibility Library (NAVL) to network equipment vendors.

In 2015, Procera was acquired by Francisco Partners, a private equity firm based in San Francisco Procera now operates as a private company and is no longer listed on NASDAQ. In 2017, Francisco Partners acquired Sandvine and merged it with Procera.

== Technology ==
Procera offers Network Intelligence solutions based on its version of deep packet inspection (DPI) called the Datastream Recognition Definition Language (DRDL). DRDL uses properties of applications for identification purposes, and this allows operators to manage subscriber traffic based on the application, similar to many DPI products. Procera offers over 100 use cases in Analytics, Traffic Management, Policy Enforcement, and Service Provider Compliance.

== Controversy ==
In October 2016 it was alleged that Procera had sold its DPI software to the government of Turkey via the telecoms company Turk Telecom in order to reveal the usernames and passwords of people visiting unencrypted websites. According to Forbes, there was significant internal opposition from technologists working for Procera to the sale. Current and former employees are said to have told Forbes that 'Turk Telekom requested not just a feed of subscribers’ usernames and passwords for unencrypted websites, but also their IP addresses, what sites they’d visited and when.'

== See also ==
- Deep packet inspection
- Sandvine
