= GMLC =

The Gateway Mobile Location Centre (GMLC) contains functionality required to support location-based service (LBS). In one public land mobile network (PLMN), there may be more than one GMLC. The GMLC is the first node an external LBS client accesses in a GSM, UMTS or LTE network. The GMLC may request routing information from the home location register (HLR) or home subscriber server HSS). After performing registration authorization, it sends positioning requests to either the visited mobile switching centre (VMSC), SGSN serving GPRS support node (SGSN) or mobile switching centre (MSC) server and receives final location estimates from the corresponding entity.

GMLC is used for various services such as emergency services, vehicle tracking, location-based advertising, and much more.
