= CGI =

CGI may refer to:

== Technology ==
- Computer-generated imagery, computer-graphic effects in films, television programs, and other visual media
- Computer Graphics Interface, the low-level interface between the Graphical Kernel System and hardware
- Common Gateway Interface, a standard for dynamic generation of web pages by a web server
  - CGI.pm, a Perl module for implementing Common Gateway Interface programs
- Compacted graphite iron, a type of cast iron
- Corrugated galvanised iron, a type of molded sheet metal
- Cell Global Identity, a standard identifier for mobile phone cells

== Organizations ==
- California Graduate Institute, an independent graduate school specializing in psychology
- Catholic Guides of Ireland, a Girl Guide association
- Chulabhorn Graduate Institute, a private graduate institute in Thailand
- CGI Aero or RusAir, a Russian airline
- CGI Inc., a multinational information technology and business process services company
- Clinton Global Initiative, a forum created by former US President Bill Clinton to discuss global problems
- Coast Guard Intelligence, the intelligence branch of the United States Coast Guard
- Commission for the Management and Application of Geoscience Information
- Compagnie Générale Immobiliere, a Moroccan real-estate development company
- Consultative Group on Indonesia, a former consortium of donors to the Indonesian government
- Cuerpo Guardia de Infantería, an Argentine police riot control service
- General Commissariat of Information, the Comisaría General de Información is an intelligence service within the National Police Corps of Spain.

== Other uses ==
- Clinical global impression, a family of scales to assess treatment response associated with mental disorders
- Cognitively Guided Instruction, an approach to mathematics teaching and learning
- CpG islands, in genetics, genomic regions that contain a high frequency of CG dinucleotides
- Cape Girardeau Regional Airport (IATA airport code: CGI), an airport in Missouri, US
