= Sandvine =

Canadian networking equipment company

AppLogic Networks Corporation
- Type: Private
- Industry: Networking Hardware and Software
- Founded: 2001; 25 years ago in Waterloo, Ontario
- Headquarters: Waterloo, Canada
- Website: www.applogicnetworks.com

AppLogic Networks Corporation, formerly Sandvine Incorporated, is an application and network intelligence company based in Waterloo, Ontario.

AppLogic markets network policy control products that are designed to implement broad network policies, including Internet censorship, congestion management, and security. AppLogic's products target Tier 1 and Tier 2 networks for consumers, including cable, DSL, and mobile.

== Operation ==
AppLogic classifies application traffic across mobile and local networks by user, device, network type, location and other parameters. The company then applies machine learning-based analytics to real-time data and makes technical policy changes.

As of 2025, AppLogic has over 500 customers globally.

== Company history ==
AppLogic (formerly Sandvine) was formed in August, 2001 in Waterloo, Ontario by a team of approximately 30 people from PixStream, a company that had recently closed after being acquired by Cisco. An initial round of VC funding launched the company with $20 million CAD. A subsequent round of financing of $19 million (CAD) was completed in May 2005. In March 2006 Sandvine completed an initial public offering on the London AIM exchange under the ticker 'SAND'. In October 2006 Sandvine completed an initial public offering on the Toronto Stock Exchange under the ticker 'SVC'.

Initial product sales focused on congestion management and fair usage as service providers struggled with the rapid growth in broadband traffic. As fiber rollouts and 4G networks became more prevalent, the company's application optimization and monetization use cases were adopted by many customers. This allowed service providers to deliver usage and application-based plans, zero-rate applications, reduce fraud, and introduce security and parental controls as a way to generate new revenues.

In June 2007 Sandvine acquired CableMatrix Technologies for its PacketCable Multimedia (PCMM)-based PCRF that enable broadband operators to increase subscriber satisfaction while delivering media-rich IP applications and services such as SIP telephony, video streaming, on-line gaming, and videoconferencing.

In July 2017 Sandvine shareholders accepted a $562 million (CAD) takeover bid from PNI Acquireco Corp., an affiliate of Francisco Partners and Procera Networks. The acquisition was completed in September 2017 when Sandvine shares ceased to be listed in the Toronto Stock Exchange.

The acquisition was completed despite concerns raised by Ronald Deibert, the director of the Citizen Lab at the Munk School of Global Affairs at the University of Toronto who argued that the takeover required “closer scrutiny” by the federal government, largely in light of some of the activities done by two of Francisco's portfolio companies. Most notably Procera Networks was part of a controversy where its technology is alleged to have been used to spy on Turkish citizens.

In March 2025, Sandvine became AppLogic Networks following new CEO and Board of Director appointments. The rebrand came after the company was removed from the Department of Commerce's Entity List in October 2024. Their addition to the Entity List was due to the usage of their technologies in non-Democratic nations to conduct mass web-monitoring and censorship, including Egypt. In an open letter, AppLogic's rebrand was critiqued by several human rights organizations and news outlets following AppLogic's announced corporate reforms after the lack of transparency leaving Egypt and failing to remedy past abuses linked to their technologies, which AppLogic responded to eight days later.

== Internet throttling and censorship ==
=== United States ===
AppLogic products were used by Comcast in the United States to limit number of sessions of Internet traffic generated by peer-to-peer file sharing software. AppLogic's previous traffic discrimination product, Fairshare, is described in detail in an RFC. According to independent testing, Comcast injected reset packets into peer-to-peer connections, which effectively caused a certain limited number of outbound connections to immediately terminate. AppLogic's traffic management is now presented under ActiveLogic and Fair Usage and Congestion Management.

The P2P throttling focuses on Gnutella, and uses a path cost algorithm to reduce speeds while still delivering the same content. Sandvine uses stateful deep packet inspection and packet spoofing to allow the networking device to determine the details of the P2P conversation, including the hash requested. The device can then determine the optimal peer to use, and substitute it for the one selected by the P2P algorithm by "[sitting] in the middle, imitating both ends of the connection, and sending reset packets to both client and server."

=== Egypt and other countries ===
According to research by Citizen Lab, products sold by Sandvine are being used to facilitate censorship of the Internet in Egypt, an allegation the company denies. In March 2018, Citizen Lab published a report showing evidence that PacketLogic devices from Sandvine could have been used to deploy government spyware in Turkey and redirect Egyptian users to affiliate ads. On February 27, 2024, Sandvine Incorporated was added to the U.S. Department of Commerce's Bureau of Industry and Security (BIS) Entity List. This designation was "based on information that Sandvine supplies deep packet inspection technology to the Government of Egypt, where it is used in mass web-monitoring and censorship to block news as well as target political actors and human rights activists." The company was later removed from the Entity List in October 2024 following "significant corporate reforms to protect human rights"

Egypt’s government relied on Sandvine equipment to block access to independent news sites. In Jordan, Sandvine Inc.’s equipment was used to censor an LGBTQ website. In Azerbaijan, it was deployed for a social media blackout, current and former employees say. But the company’s equipment — which is often used to manage the flow of network traffic — has also been used to censor the internet in more than a dozen countries in recent years, according to three current, five former employees and company documents. Those countries include Algeria, Afghanistan, Azerbaijan, Egypt, Eritrea, Jordan, Kuwait, Pakistan, Qatar, Russia, Sudan, Thailand, Turkey, the United Arab Emirates and Uzbekistan, according to Sandvine sales records with government agencies and network operators — both private and government-controlled.

== Support for Internet shutdowns during Belarus protests ==
During the 2020–21 Belarusian protests, Belarusian officials shut down internet access with technology made by Sandvine. Peter Micek, general counsel at the human rights group Access Now, called on federal authorities to investigate Sandvine and the private equity firm Francisco Partners and questioned the effectiveness of Sandvine's business ethics committee. “Their services appear to have been used in Belarus to silence people and to cover up egregious human rights violations”, Micek said. According to media reports, there was unease among Sandvine employees about the role of their company in the repression of political protests in Belarus since August 2020. In a conference call with employees on September 10, 2020, Sandvine's management, however, seems to have been unapologetic about their role in Belarus: "Alexander Haväng, Sandvine’s chief technology officer, ... said that Sandvine had concluded that the internet, and access to specific material on websites, wasn’t 'a part of human rights'. 'We don’t want to play world police', he said. 'We believe that each sovereign country should be allowed to set their own policy on what is allowed and what is not allowed in that country.'"

Sandvine, then owned by Francisco Partners, said it would stop selling its equipment in Belarus after the report. On September 15, 2020, the company formally cancelled its deal, stating it abhors "the use of technology to suppress the free flow of information resulting in human rights violations." However, its hardware was left at two locations near Minsk, which allows the government to control approximately 40% of internet traffic in the country.
