= RANAP =

Telecommunications protocol

In telecommunications networks, RANAP (Radio Access Network Application Part) is a protocol specified by 3GPP in TS 25.413 and used in UMTS for signaling between the Core Network, which can be a MSC or SGSN, and the UTRAN. RANAP is carried over Iu-interface.

RANAP signalling protocol resides in the control plane of Radio network layer of Iu interface in the UMTS (Universal Mobile Telecommunication System) protocol stack. Iu interface is the interface between RNC (Radio Network Controller) and CN (Core Network). nb. For Iu-ps transport RANAP is carried on SCTP if IP interface used on this.

RANAP handles signaling for the Iu-PS - RNC and 3G SGSN and Iu-CS - RNC and 3G MSC . It also provides the signaling channel to transparently pass messages between the User Equipment (UE) and the CN.

In LTE, RANAP has been replaced by S1AP. In SA (standalone) installations of 5G, S1AP will be replaced by NGAP.

== Functionality ==
RANAP is used on the Iu interface to provide signalling functions for the management of radio access bearers, Iu resources, and relocation of the serving radio network controller.

== See also ==
- GPRS Tunnelling Protocol (GTP)
