= CUG =

CUG may refer to:

- Closed User Group, groups of GSM mobile telephone subscribers
- Genetic code for leucine
- China University of Geosciences (Beijing)
- China University of Geosciences (Wuhan)
- The Complete University Guide, a university league table compiler and student advice website
- Central University of Gujarat, India
