= Cell Global Identity =

Identifier in mobile phone networks

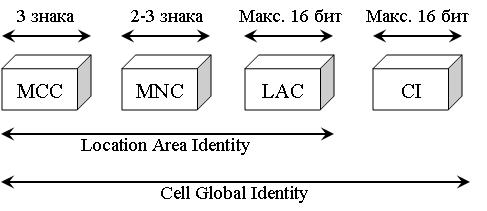
Diagram of Cell Global Identity

Cell Global Identity (CGI) is a globally unique identifier for a Base Transceiver Station in mobile phone networks. It consists of four parts: Mobile Country Code (MCC), Mobile Network Code (MNC), Location Area Code (LAC) and Cell Identification (CI). It is an integral part of 3GPP specifications for mobile networks, for example, for identifying individual base stations to "handover" ongoing phone calls between separately controlled base stations, or between different mobile technologies.

MCC and MNC make up a PLMN identifier, and PLMN and LAC make up a location area identity (LAI), which uniquely identifies a Location Area of a given operator's network. So a CGI can be seen as a LAI with added Cell Identification, to further identify the individual base station of that Location Area.

== Overview ==
- a CGI (e.g. 001-02-3-4) consists of:
  - a LAI (001-02-3), which consists of:
    - a PLMN (001-02), which consists of:
      - MCC (001)
      - MNC (02)
    - and a LAC (03),
  - and a CI (4)

== Examples ==
These are merely contrived examples and do not necessarily represent real cells (see the list of Mobile Country Codes and).

- 001-01-1-1: 001-01 is a PLMN designated for testing purposes, with location area 1 and cell 1.
- 289-88-23-42: would identify cell 42 in location area 23 of the A-Mobile operator in Abkhazia
- 648-03-65535-65535: would represent the highest possible CI and LAC numbers of the Telecel operator in Zimbabwe

Note that an MNC can be of two-digit form and three-digit form with leading zeros, so that 01 and 001 are actually two distinct MNCs. Hence the CGIs 001-02-3-4 and 001-002-3-4 would be two completely unrelated cells, which would be in the same country, but belong to two completely distinct operators (02 and 002). From PLMN assignments, it is apparent that such dualities of two-digit and three-digit MNCs with the same number value are avoided. An example for an actual three-digit MNC with leading zeros is 750-001, of the operator Cable and Wireless South Atlantic Ltd (Falkland Islands).

== Geographic location ==
A more specific application of the CGI is to roughly determine a mobile phone's geographical position. If a cell phone is connected to a GSM network then the position of that particular cell phone can be determined using CGI of the cell which is covering that cell phone. There is a series of related technologies that were developed based on CGI that enhances the location precision: Cell Global Identity with Timing Advance (CGI+TA), Enhanced CGI (E-CGI), Cell ID for WCDMA, Uplink Time Difference Of Arrival (U-TDOA) and Any Time Interrogation (ATI), and the high accuracy terminal based method Assisted Global Positioning System (A-GPS).
