= Supplementary service codes =

Mobile telecommunications standard

ETSI and 3rd Generation Partnership Project (3GPP) standards, such as GSM and LTE, define supplementary service codes that make it possible to query and set certain service parameters (e.g., call forwarding) directly from mobile devices.

== See also ==
- GSM
- GSM services: Supplementary Services
- Vertical service code
- GSM USSD codes - Unstructured Supplementary Service Data: list of standard GSM codes for network and SIM related functions
