= GPRS roaming exchange =

A GPRS roaming exchange (GRX) acts as a hub for General Packet Radio Service (GPRS) connections from roaming users, removing the need for a dedicated link between each GPRS service provider. It was developed to facilitate a more efficient way for operators to interconnect networks, and played a large part in the transition to third-generation systems.

== Development ==
Initially GPRS roaming was based on complicated relationships between individual operators with each operator requiring a dedicated link to each different partner so that $\tfrac{N(N-1)}{2}$, whereby $N$ is the number of global operators that would require a dedicated link. This meant that mobile subscribers who wanted to use GPRS whilst roaming could only do so if their operator had a direct agreement with the operator in the country or area in which they were roaming.

In 2000 the GSMA (GSM Association) developed the idea of GRX to handle all roaming between public land mobile networks (PLMNs).

== Technical implementation ==
Usually, GRX is based on a private or public IP backbone and uses GPRS Tunnelling Protocol on the session layer (OSI Layer Five) between the visited PLMN (Public Land Mobile Network) and the home PLMN. Each GRX operator will have a network consisting of a set of routers and links connecting to the GPRS networks, moreover the GRX network will have links connecting to other GRX nodes in peer model.

The GRX operator can therefore act as a hub, allowing a GPRS subscriber to interconnect with many roaming partners without the need for dedicated links. For operators this is advantageous in that it allows quicker implementation of roaming partners, faster time to market for new operators and lower capital expenditure seeing as it is a scalable solution depending on bandwidth and quality of service requirements. Because the interconnection between the visited PLMN and home PLMN uses private GRX networks there is also no need to maintain Internet Protocol Security (IPsec) tunnels over the public internet.

== See also ==
- IP exchange (IPX)
