= IP exchange =

Telecommunications interconnection model

High-level architecture of IPX network connecting various operators & service providers together for the exchange of different IP based traffic

IP exchange or (IPX) is a telecommunications interconnection model for the exchange of IP based traffic between customers of separate mobile and fixed operators as well as other types of service provider (such as ISP), via IP based Network-to-Network Interface. IPX is developed by the GSM Association.

IPX is not intended to replace or compete with the Internet but it does offer an alternative option for service providers. The intent of IPX is to provide interoperability of IP-based services between all service provider types within a commercial framework that enables all parties in the value chain to receive a commercial return. The commercial relationships are underpinned with service level agreements which guarantee performance, quality and security.

It may not be evident to end-users whether their service provider utilises the IPX model or not, however, the ability for service providers to differentiate services using the flexibility provided by the IPX model, ultimately provides for end-user choice.

== Background ==
Traditionally, voice traffic interconnection between different operators has utilized the international SS7/TDM networks. However, lately the all-IP paradigm with VoIP is being rapidly introduced by different operators in various forms, such as IMS. In order to minimize the number of conversions between packet-switched voice and circuit-switched voice there is a clear need to deploy an IP based NNI (Network-to-Network Interface) and therefore an IP based interconnection network.

It is also evident that a large number of IP based services (such as Presence or IM) simply cannot be interconnected using a SS7/TDM network, further increasing the need for evolution into an IP based interconnection network.

Since the year 2000 GSM operators have been using GRX (GPRS Roaming Exchange) network for routing the IP based commercial roaming traffic between visited and home operators. Mainly 2.5G and 3G data roaming has been using GRX. GRX is a private IP network (separated from the internet) consisting of multiple different GRX carriers that are connected to each other via peering points. However, GRX is limited only to GSM operator community and not all GRX's are capable of meeting the demands of real-time services.

Even though the GRX environment is not entirely suitable as a common IP network for interconnection and roaming, it offers a good starting point for the development of IPX. IPX development has been done in various GSM Association projects and working groups since 2004.

== Need for a private backbone ==
IP based interconnection could be handled with Internet, since Internet natively supports the IP protocol and offers the required global connectivity. But there are issues when using Internet for this particular purpose. As Alex Sinclair of GSMA put it, "The open Internet is a wonderful thing, but when it comes to providing a guaranteed quality of service, particularly for time-critical services, there is still a long way to go".

Naturally operators and other service providers are free to choose which interconnection option to use. It is also possible to use multiple different options at the same time (although this will lead to increased complexity).

== Architecture ==
IPX architecture consists of different IPX Providers connecting together via an IPX peering point for traffic exchange. Both signaling (such as SIP) and media (such as RTP) is transported end-to-end in accordance with IPX specifications. A typical end-to-end path of traffic in a fixed to mobile interconnection scenario is illustrated below:

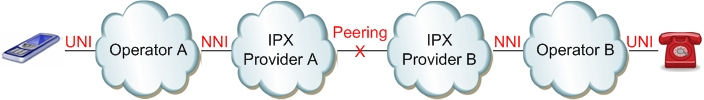

^{X is a peering point where IPX Provider A and IPX Provider B exchange traffic}

IPX offers both bilateral and multilateral interconnection. Bilateral means the traditional model of two operators bilaterally writing an interconnection contract prior to setting up a connection to each other themselves. Multilateral on the other hand means that the IPX provider to some extent takes care of both handling the contract and connectivity set-up on behalf of the operators. Setting up bilateral interconnection contracts & connections with tens/hundreds of other operators can be a major burden. Therefore, the multilateral option, which allows an operator to open multiple connections by making a single contract and single technical connection with the IPX provider, makes interconnection deployment easier and faster.

== Key features ==
- Open - open to any fixed operator, mobile operator or other service provider (such as ISP or cable operator) willing to adopt the necessary common IPX technical and commercial principles and sign in
- Quality - support for QoS ensured by usage of combination of technical features in the network and an enforceable contract model among all the players involved (end-to-end Service Level Agreements)
- Cascading payments – the cascading responsibility in IPX means each party is responsible for the performance of the next party in the transit chain. Because all participants make this commitment, the financial benefits of providing the service are cascaded through the value chain, enabling all involved to receive a commercial return for their participation
- Efficient connectivity - operator connecting to IPX can choose a multilateral interconnection mode where one interconnection contract opens multiple interconnection partners
- All IP - supporting natively IP based protocols (such as SIP, RTP, GTP, SMTP, SCTP etc.)
- Secure - completely separated from the public internet, both logically and physically. IPX is not addressable nor visible from the internet
- Global - not restricted to a certain geographical area
- Backwards compatible - IPX specifications are compliant with the existing specifications and recommendations. There is no need to upgrade for example, a 3GPP compliant IMS core system with the implementation of an IPX compliant Network-to-Network Interface (NNI)
- NNI only - IPX requirements address NNI only. The User-to-Network Interface (UNI) is out of scope
- Common technical specifications used end-to-end
- Interconnection and roaming - IPX covers both interconnection and roaming scenarios
- Competitive environment - IPX services are provided by a number of competing international IP carriers all connected to each other via dedicated IPX peering points

== Status ==
Principles of IPX have been successively tested and validated by GSMA. From 2004 onwards, GSMA SIP Trials tested IP-based NNI with numerous IMS based services. IPX Pre-commercial Implementation trials have been ongoing since April 2007 focusing especially on packet switched voice service.

GSMA press release in February 2008 explains that IPX trials have been completed successfully. A number of international carriers are preparing to roll out IPX services, such as IPX Voice, Belgacom International Carrier Services, BT, CITIC 1616, Deutsche Telekom ICSS, iBasis, Reach, SAP Mobile Services, Syniverse, Tata Communications, Telecom Italia Sparkle, Telecom New Zealand International, Telefónica International Wholesale Services, Telekom Austria, Telenor Global Services, TeliaSonera International Carrier, Comfone AG Switzerland. These companies will function as IPX Providers towards fixed and mobile operators and other service provider types.

GSMA is open to support further trials on demand.

== See also ==
- Interconnection
- Roaming
- NNI
- Peering
- Internetwork Packet Exchange
- GPRS Roaming Exchange (GRX)
