= Closed user group =

Supplementary service in mobile plans

Closed User group (CUG) is a supplementary service provided by the mobile operators to mobile subscribers who can make and receive calls from any member associated within the group. This service is applicable for SMS also. There will be administrative owner who will be responsible for invoicing. Irrespective of this a CUG member can make and receive calls to and from other networks outside the CUG group too; although calls outside a CUG group may not be invoiced by the administrative owner.

A subscriber may:

- be a member of more than one but not more than ten closed user groups;
- be permitted to make calls outside of the closed user group (outgoing access);
- be permitted to receive calls from outside of the closed user group (incoming access);
- be allowed to make emergency calls irrespective of the group subscription.
- be allowed to make call inside the closed user group member like incoming and outgoing also.

If the user is a member of multiple closed user groups there will be a preferred CUG assigned by the network that will be used by default. However, it is possible on a per-call basis to specify a different closed user group (of which the user is a member) for the call. It is also possible on a per-call basis to suppress the use of the preferred CUG, i.e. act as if the user is not a member of the closed user group, and to suppress the outgoing access permission, i.e. to insist that the call only go through if the destination is a member of the CUG.

When an incoming call is received it is possible for the network to indicate the closed user group that is being applied to the call to the called user.

For example:

Mr Smith, a senior member at a pizza delivery outlet, could be a member of two closed user groups:

- his own team of pizza delivery agents;
- his peer group of senior pizza delivery executives.

Mr Smith's preferred CUG would be that of his team. But based on whom Mr. Smith is calling, he can either suppress or enable the preferred CUG. Also, when Mr. Smith receives a call, the network would indicate which user group the call originated from.

As can be seen, this supplementary service is restricted in use only by organizations, and is not for use by the general public. However, there are handsets that support closed user group applications.

== Technical references ==
- 3GPP 22.085 Closed user group (CUG) supplementary services; Stage 1
- 3GPP 24.085 Closed user group (CUG) supplementary services; Stage 3
