= Circuit Switched Data =

Data transmission standard for mobile phones

In communications, Circuit Switched Data (CSD) (also named GSM data) is the original form of data transmission developed for the time-division multiple access (TDMA)-based mobile phone systems like Global System for Mobile Communications (GSM). In later years, High Speed Circuit Switched Data (HSCSD) was developed providing increased data rates over conventional CSD. After 2010 many telecommunication carriers dropped support for CSD and HSCSD, having been superseded by GPRS and EDGE (E-GPRS). CSD uses a single radio time slot to deliver a 9.6 kbit/s data transmission.

== Technical ==
CSD uses a single radio time slot to deliver 9.6 kbit/s data transmission to the GSM network switching subsystem where it could be connected through the equivalent of a normal modem to the Public Switched Telephone Network (PSTN), allowing direct calls to any dial-up service. For backwards compatibility, the IS-95 standard also supports CDMA Circuit Switched Data. However, unlike TDMA, there are no time slots, and all CDMA radios can be active all the time to deliver up to 14.4 kbit/s data transmission speeds. With the evolution of CDMA to CDMA2000 and 1xRTT, the use of IS-95 CDMA Circuit Switched Data declined in favour of the faster data transmission speeds available with the newer technologies.

Prior to CSD, data transmission over mobile phone systems was done by using a modem, either built into the phone or attached to it. Such systems were limited by the quality of the audio signal to 2.4 kbit/s or less. With the introduction of digital transmission in TDMA-based systems like GSM, CSD provided almost direct access to the underlying digital signal, allowing for higher speeds. At the same time, the speech-oriented audio compression used in GSM actually meant that data rates using a traditional modem connected to the phone would have been even lower than with older analog systems.

A CSD call functions in a very similar way to a normal voice call in a GSM network. A single dedicated radio time slot is allocated between the phone and the base station. A dedicated "sub-time slot" (16 kbit/s) is allocated from the base station to the transcoder, and finally, another time slot (64 kbit/s) is allocated from the transcoder to the Mobile Switching Centre (MSC).

At the MSC, it is possible to use a modem to convert to an analog signal, though this will typically actually be encoded as a digital pulse-code modulation (PCM) signal when sent from the MSC. It is also possible to directly use the digital signal as an Integrated Services Digital Network (ISDN) data signal and feed it into the equivalent of a remote access server.

== High Speed Circuit Switched Data (HSCSD) ==
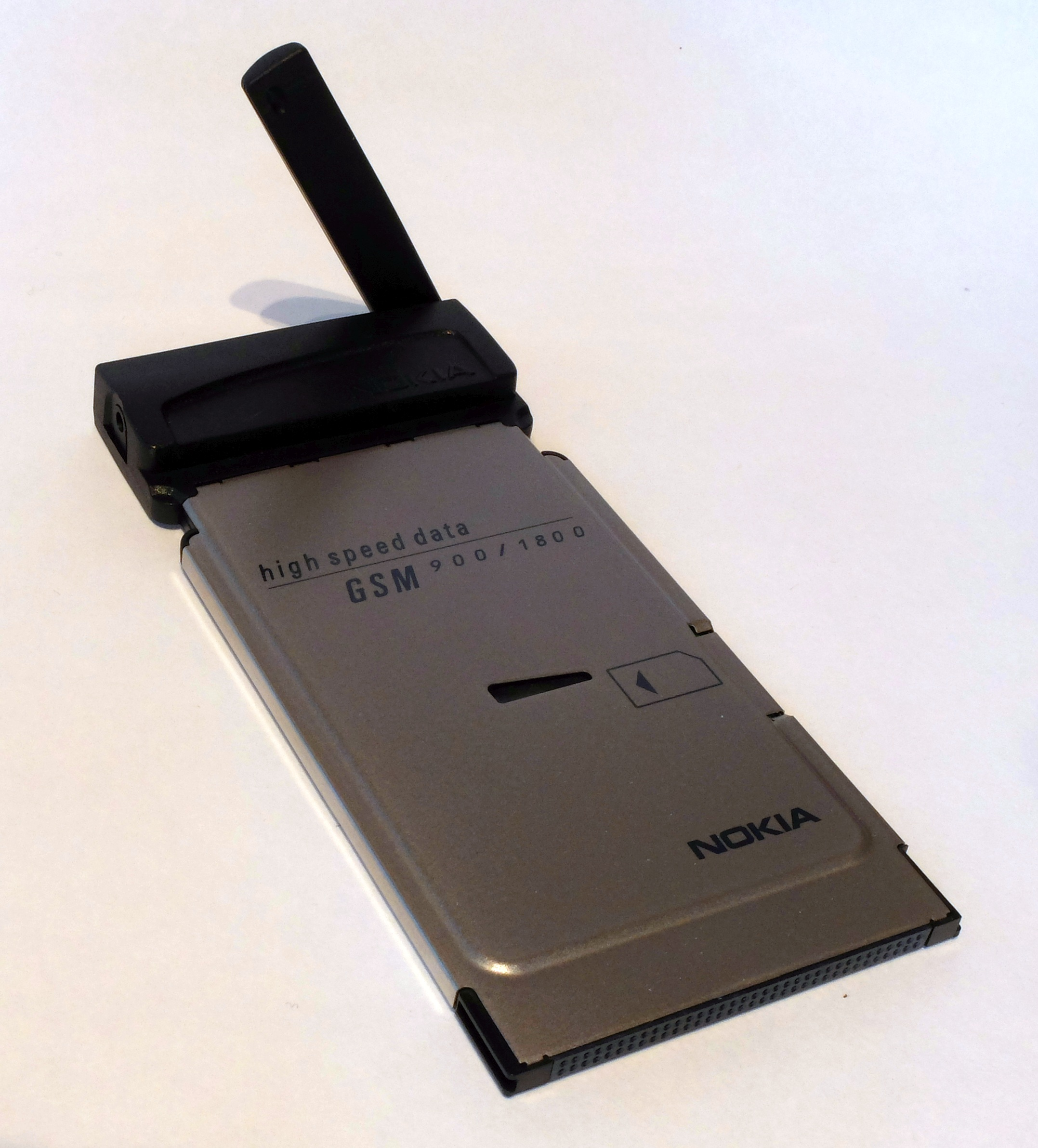
Few devices support HSCSD – the Nokia CardPhone 2.0 PC Card is one of them.

High Speed Circuit Switched Data (HSCSD) is an enhancement to CSD designed to provide higher data rates by means of more efficient channel coding and/or multiple (up to 4) time slots. It requires the time slots being used to be fully reserved to a single user. A transfer rate of up to 57.6 kbit/s (i.e., 4 × 14.4 kbit/s) can be reached, or even 115 kbit/s if a network allows combining 8 slots instead of just 4. It is possible that either at the beginning of the call, or at some point during a call, it will not be possible for the user's full request to be satisfied since the network is often configured to allow normal voice calls to take precedence over additional time slots for HSCSD users.

An innovation in HSCSD is to allow different error correction methods to be used for data transfer. The original error correction used in GSM was designed to work at the limits of coverage and in the worst case that GSM will handle. This means that a large part of the GSM transmission capacity is taken up with error correction codes. HSCSD provides different levels of possible error correction which can be used according to the quality of the radio link. This means that in the best conditions 14.4 kbit/s can be put through a single time slot that under CSD would only carry 9.6 kbit/s, i.e. a 50% improvement in throughput.

The user is typically charged for HSCSD at a rate higher than a normal phone call (e.g., by the number of time slots allocated) for the total period of time that the user has a connection active. This makes HSCSD relatively expensive in many GSM networks and is one of the reasons that packet-switched General Packet Radio Service (GPRS), which typically has lower pricing (based on amount of data transferred rather than the duration of the connection), has become more common than HSCSD.

Apart from the fact that the full allocated bandwidth of the connection is available to the HSCSD user, HSCSD also has an advantage in GSM systems in terms of lower average radio interface latency than GPRS. This is because the user of an HSCSD connection does not have to wait for permission from the network to send a packet.

HSCSD is also an option in Enhanced Data Rates for GSM Evolution (EDGE) and Universal Mobile Telecommunications System (UMTS) systems where packet data transmission rates are much higher. In the UMTS system, the advantages of HSCSD over packet data are even lower since the UMTS radio interface has been specifically designed to support high bandwidth, low latency packet connections. This means that the primary reason to use HSCSD in this environment would be access to legacy dial up systems.

HSCSD was specified in 1997. Nokia 6210 was the first mobile phone from Nokia that supported HSCSD.

== Successors ==
GSM data transmission has advanced since the introduction of CSD:

- General Packet Radio Service (GPRS) provides more efficient packet-based data transmission directly from the mobile phone at speeds roughly twice those of HSCSD.
- Enhanced Data Rates for GSM Evolution (EDGE) (E-GPRS) and Universal Mobile Telecommunications System (UMTS) provide improved radio interfaces with higher data rates, while still being backward compatible with the GSM core network.
- Enhanced Circuit Switched Data (ECSD) was developed alongside GPRS/EDGE

In some places CSD services have continued to operate on 2G networks for a long time. In the Netherlands operator KPN switched the service off in 2021.

== See also ==
- Circuit switching
- Global System for Mobile Communications (GSM)
- General Packet Radio Service (GPRS)
- Mobile phone
- Time-division multiple access (TDMA)
- List of interface bit rates
