= Charging data record =

Term in mobile telecommunications

For mobile telecommunications, the Charging Data Record (CDR) is, in 3GPP parlance, a formatted collection of information about a chargeable telecommunication event (making a phone call, using the Internet from your mobile device).

CDRs are used for user billing: a telecom provider transfers them from time to time in order to send bills to their users. CDRs are sent in GTP' messages, or saved in files and fetched with FTP protocol.

Information on chargeable events includes time of call set-up, duration of the call, amount of data transferred, etc. A separate CDR is generated for each party to be charged.

Entries on CDRs use a {category, usage} syntax. Usage units can be bits (e.g. user downloaded a 1MB movie), seconds (e.g. user downloaded 1 minute of a movie), or other units (e.g. user downloaded 1 movie).

== CDR type ==
CDRs can be classified basically on two parameters

- The node at which they're generated: GGSN, SGSN, PGW, SGW, etc.
- The kind of service or activity they're charging : MBMS, Mobility, Location request etc.

As per the specifications the records are classified as follows :

- S-CDR
- SGW-CDR
- PGW-CDR
- eG-CDR
- M-CDR
- S-SMO-CDR
- LCS-MO-CDR
- LCS-NI-CDR
- S-MB-CDR
- G-MB-CDR
- MBMS-GW-CDR

== See also ==
- Call detail record, the counterpart for Circuit Switch service usage. Also abbreviated as CDR.
