= Mobile switching centre server =

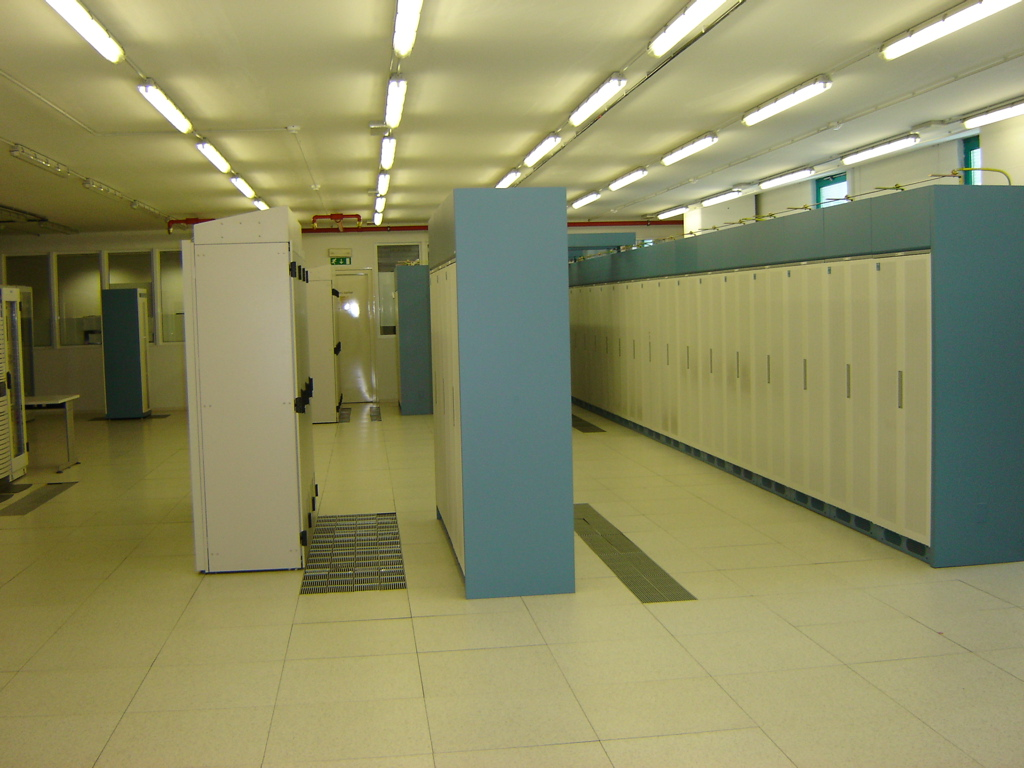
Lucent 5ESS GSM Mobile Switching Centre deployed at Western Wireless International in Ljubljana, Slovenia from 2001 to 2006.

The mobile switching station, abbreviated as MSC Server or MSS, is a 2G core network element which controls the network switching subsystem elements. Alternatively or adaptively, MSS can be used in GSM networks as well, if the manufacturer has implemented support for GSM networks in the MSS. Since an immediate upgrade of existing GSM network to 3G is not viable due to various issues like handset incompatibilities and high expenditure, most manufacturers do implement GSM support in MSS. In fact, MSS along with other 3G network elements such as media gateway (MGW), can be configured to support GSM network exclusively and can be considered as an upgraded version of existing GSM mobile switching centres. The MSC Server is standards-based and communicates with other distributed elements using industry open standards such as media gateway control protocol, megaco/H.248, Session Initiation Protocol, M2UA and M3UA. The MSC server incorporates industry standards as defined by ETSI, ITU, GSM, 3GPP and 3GPP2 and other leading standard bodies. The MSS supports the regulatory environment set by governing bodies via its support for E911, CALEA/legal intercept, wireless and local number portability, TTY/TTD, and Number Pooling requirements.

Alternatively MSS is also called an MTS-U (Motorola telephony soft-switch) in Motorola terminology, and as MSC-S in Ericsson terminology. MSC server functionality enables split between control plane (signalling) and user plane (bearer in network element called a media gateway), which guarantees better placement of network elements within the network.

MSC server and MGW makes it possible to cross-connect circuit switched calls switched by using IP, ATM AAL2 as well as TDM.
