= Mobile station =

Imsi catcher

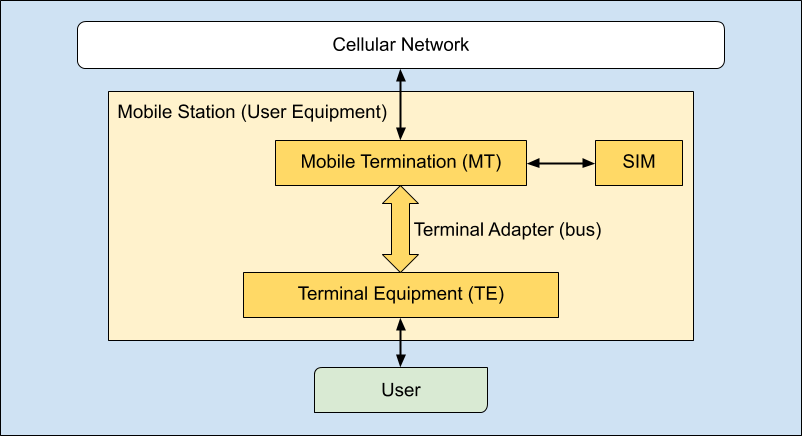
Mobile Station Diagram

A mobile station (MS) comprises all user equipment and software needed for communication with a mobile network.

The term refers to the global system connected to the mobile network, i.e. a mobile phone or mobile computer connected using a mobile broadband adapter. This is the terminology of 2G systems like GSM. In 3G systems, a mobile station (MS) is now referred to as user equipment (UE).

In GSM, a mobile station consists of four main components:

- Mobile termination (MT) - offers common functions such as: radio transmission and handover, speech encoding and decoding, error detection and correction, signalling and access to the SIM. The IMEI code is attached to the MT. It is equivalent to the network termination of an ISDN access.
- Terminal equipment (TE) - is any device connected to the MS offering services to the user. It does not contain any functions specific to GSM.
- Terminal adapter (TA) - provides access to the MT as if it were an ISDN network termination with extended capabilities. Communication between the TE and MT over the TA takes place using AT commands.
- Subscriber identity module (SIM) - is a removable subscriber identification token storing the IMSI, a unique key shared with the mobile network operator and other data.

In a mobile phone, the MT, TA and TE are enclosed in the same case. However, the MT and TE functions are often performed by distinct processors. The application processor serves as a TE, while the baseband processor serves as a MT, communication between both takes place over a bus using AT commands, which serves as a TA.

== See also ==
- GSM procedures
- Radio station
- Radiocommunication service
