= Policy and charging rules function =

Policy and Charging Rules Function (PCRF) is the software node designated in real-time to determine policy rules in a multimedia network. As a policy tool, the PCRF plays a central role in next-generation networks. Unlike earlier policy engines that were added onto an existing network to enforce policy, the PCRF is a software component that operates at the network core and accesses subscriber databases and other specialized functions, such as a charging system, in a centralized manner. Because it operates in real time, the PCRF has an increased strategic significance and broader potential role than traditional policy engines. This has led to a proliferation of PCRF products since 2008.

The PCRF is the part of the network architecture that aggregates information to and from the network, operational support systems, and other sources (such as portals) in real time, supporting the creation of rules and then automatically making policy decisions for each subscriber active on the network. Such a network might offer multiple services, quality of service (QoS) levels, and charging rules. PCRF can provide a network agnostic solution (wire line and wireless) and can also enable multi-dimensional approach which helps in creating a lucrative and innovative platform for operators. PCRF can also be integrated with different platforms like billing, rating, charging, and subscriber database or can also be deployed as a standalone entity.

PCRF plays a key role in VoLTE as a mediator of network resources for the IP Multimedia Systems network for establishing the calls and allocating the requested bandwidth to the call bearer with configured attributes. This enables an operator to offer differentiated voice services to their user(s) by charging a premium. Operators also have an opportunity to use PCRF for prioritizing the calls to emergency numbers in the next-gen networks.

== See also ==
- IP Multimedia Subsystem
