= Public land mobile network =

Combination of wireless communication services

In telecommunication, a public land mobile network (PLMN) is a combination of wireless communication services offered by a specific operator in a specific country. A PLMN typically consists of several cellular technologies like GSM/2G, UMTS/3G, LTE/4G, NR/5G, offered by a single operator within a given country, often referred to as a cellular network.

== PLMN code ==
A PLMN is identified by a globally unique PLMN code, which consists of a MCC (Mobile Country Code) and MNC (Mobile Network Code). Hence, it is a five- to six-digit number identifying a country, and a mobile network operator in that country, usually represented in the form 001-01 or 001-001.

A PLMN is part of a:

- Location Area Identity (LAI) (PLMN and Location Area Code)
- Cell Global Identity (CGI) (LAI and Cell Identifier)
- IMSI (see PLMN code and IMSI)

== Leading zeros in PLMN codes ==
An MNC of two-digit form is always distinct from an MNC of three-digit form, so that, theoretically, the PLMN 001-01 is distinct from the PLMN 001-001, because of the difference in MNC length. In practice, such dualities of two-digit and three-digit MNCs with similar number value are avoided (see the list of mobile country codes and mobile network codes). An example for an actual three-digit MNC with leading zeros is 350-007 in Bermuda MCC; Bermuda also features 350-00, a two-digit MNC consisting of only zeros, and 350-01 with one leading zero.

== PLMN code and IMSI ==
The IMSI, which usually identifies a SIM, USIM or eSIM for one subscriber, typically starts with the PLMN code. For example, an IMSI belonging to the PLMN 262-33 would look like 262330000000001. Mobile phones use this to detect roaming, so that a mobile phone subscribed on a network with a PLMN code that mismatches the start of the USIM's IMSI will typically display an "R" on the icon that indicates connection strength.

== PLMN services ==
A PLMN typically offers the following services to a mobile subscriber:

- Emergency calls to local Fire/Ambulance/Police stations.
- Voice calls to/from any PLMN ("cellular network") or PSTN ("landline"/VoIP).
- Short message service (SMS) services to/from any PLMN or SIP service (the original form of texting on a mobile phone, now often replaced by Messaging apps).
- Multimedia Messaging Service (MMS) services to/from any PLMN or SIP service.
- Unstructured Supplementary Service Data (USSD) for operator specific interactions (e.g. dialing "*#100#" to indicate the current balance).
- Internet data connectivity for arbitrary services, e.g. via GPRS in GSM, IuPS in UMTS, or LTE.

The availability, quality and bandwidth of these services strongly depends on the particular technology used to implement a PLMN.
