= Synchronization Channel =

Synchronization Channel is a downlink only control channel used in GSM cellular telephone systems. It is part of the Um air interface specification. The purpose of the SCH is to allow the mobile station (handset) to quickly identify a nearby cell (a BTS) and synchronize to that BTS's TDMA structures. Each radio burst on the SCH contains:

- the current frame clock of the serving BTS,
- the Base station identity code (or BSIC), a truncated form of cell identity, and
- an extended Training Sequence that is easily detected with a matched filter.

When mobile turns on after getting FCCH it waits for getting SCCH which is to synchronise mobile's oscillator frequency with the frequency of the Base channel.

The burst structure of the SCH is defined in GSM specification 05.03 section 4.7. The encoding of the frame clock is defined in GSM specification 04.08 section 9.1.30. The TDMA multiplexing pattern of the SCH is defined in GSM specification 05.02 section 7 table 3.

The GSM Synchronization Burst Contains a Training Sequence of 64 bits that is used to facilitate synchronization.

- Sync bits are known by both the BTS and the mobile.
- Detecting where the synchronization burst occurs in time allows the MS to synchronize with the BTS baud clock and frame clock.
- Tracking the drift from SCH burst to SCH burst can be used by the mobile station to fine-tune receiver clock
