= Identity code =

Identity code may refer to:

- IC codes, used by British police forces in radio communications to specify a person's ethnicity
- Base station identity code, in mobile communications
- The code transmitted by a security token
- ID code, an encoded identifier
