= FCCH =

FCCH stands for Frequency Correction Channel. It is a downlink-only control channel in the GSM Um air interface. The FCCH burst, defined in GSM 05.02 section 5.2.4, is an all-zero sequence that produces a fixed tone in the GMSK modulator output. This tone enables the Mobile to lock its local oscillator to the BS clock as required in GSM specification 05.01 section 6. The FCCH is transmitted in frames immediately before the SCH.
