= BSIC =

BSIC is an acronym that may refer to the following:

- Banque Sahélo-Saharienne pour l'Investissement et le Commerce in Africa
- Base station identity code, in mobile telephony
