= Broadcast control channel =

A broadcast control channel (BCCH) is a point to multipoint, unidirectional (downlink) channel used in the Um interface of the GSM cellular standard. The BCCH carries a repeating pattern of system information messages that describe the identity, configuration and available features of the base transceiver station (BTS). These messages also provide a list of absolute radio-frequency channel numbers (ARFCNs) used by neighboring BTSs. This message pattern is synchronized to the BTS frame clock. The minimum BCCH message set is system information messages 2–4, although other messages are normally present. The messages themselves are described in 3GPP Technical Specification 44.018.

Any GSM ARFCN that includes a BCCH is designated as a beacon channel and is required to transmit continuously at full power.
