= NinjaTel Van =

Private cell phone network

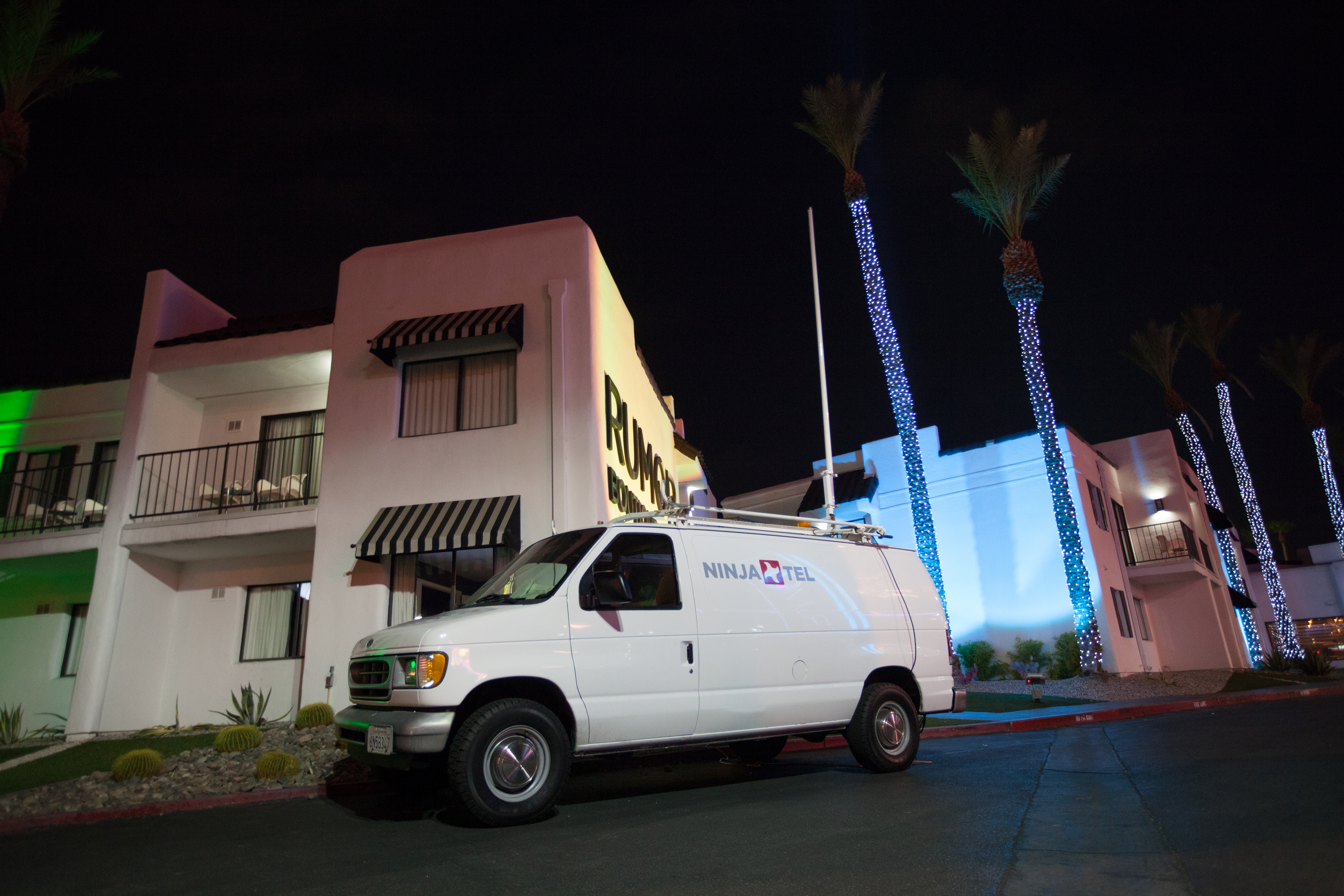
NinjaTel Van outside the DEF CON 20 Ninja Party

The NinjaTel Van is a 2001 Ford Econoline van that served as the base of operations for a private cell phone network from July 26 to July 29, 2012, at DEF CON 20. The Ninja Networks team operated the network from a van placed in the Vendor area of DEF CON 20, at the Rio Hotel/Casino in Las Vegas, and the Ninja Party, at Rumor Boutique Hotel in Las Vegas. NinjaTel served a small network of 650 GSM phones using custom SIM cards.

The project, including building out the van, took almost a year. The van is equipped with a mobile GSM cellular network, featuring all necessary equipment and a roof-mounted antenna.

== Network ==
The network uses OpenBTS, Asterisk, and an Ettus Research Universal Software Radio Peripheral to provide voice and SMS service to connected devices. During DEF CON 20 it did not have data ability.

== Other deployments ==
In 2013 the van was used to provide wireless network connectivity to a remote wilderness area for the production of Capture, an American reality competition television series on The CW.

== Gallery ==
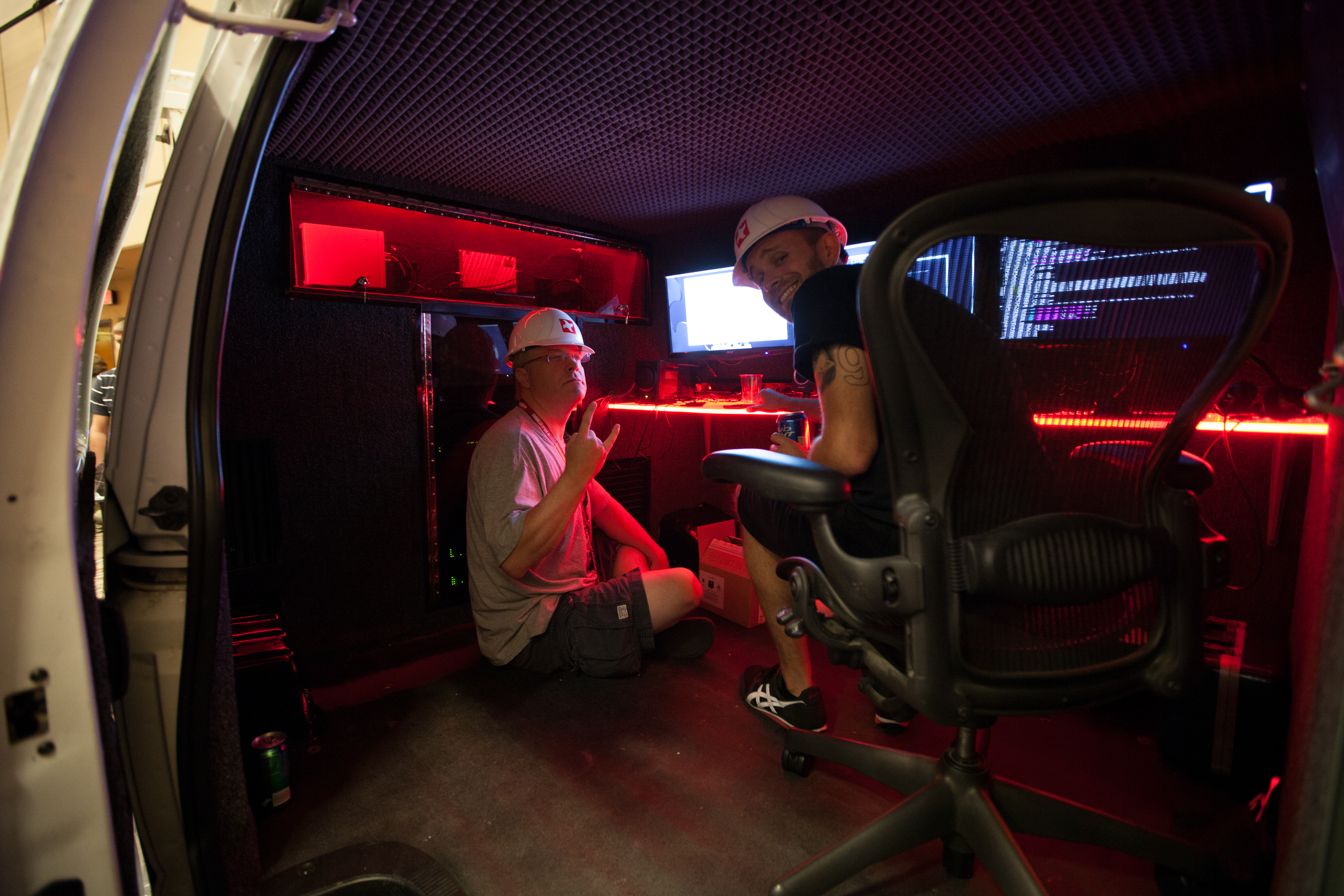
Interior operator desks and equipment

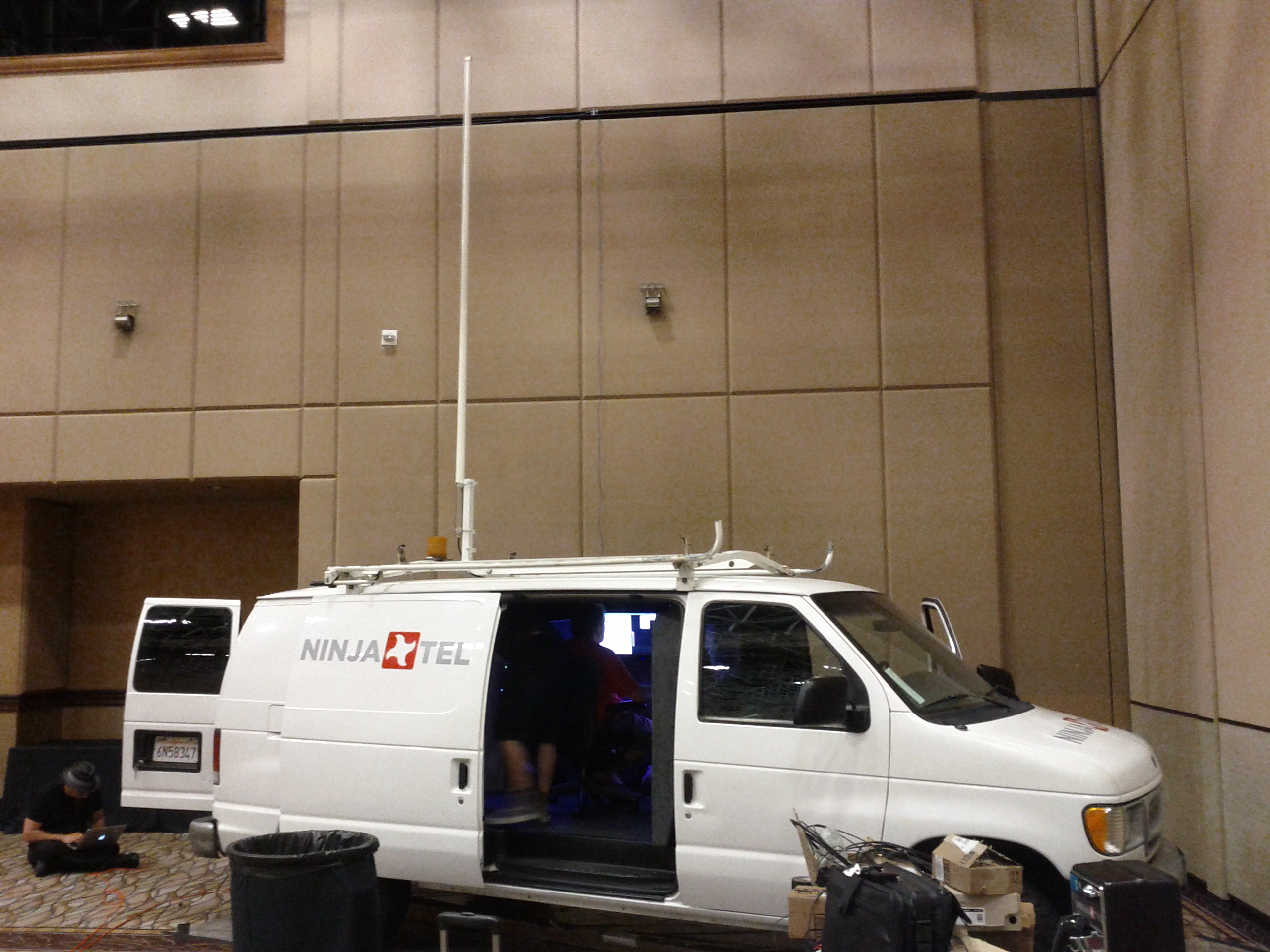
NinjaTel Van in vendor room of DEF CON 20

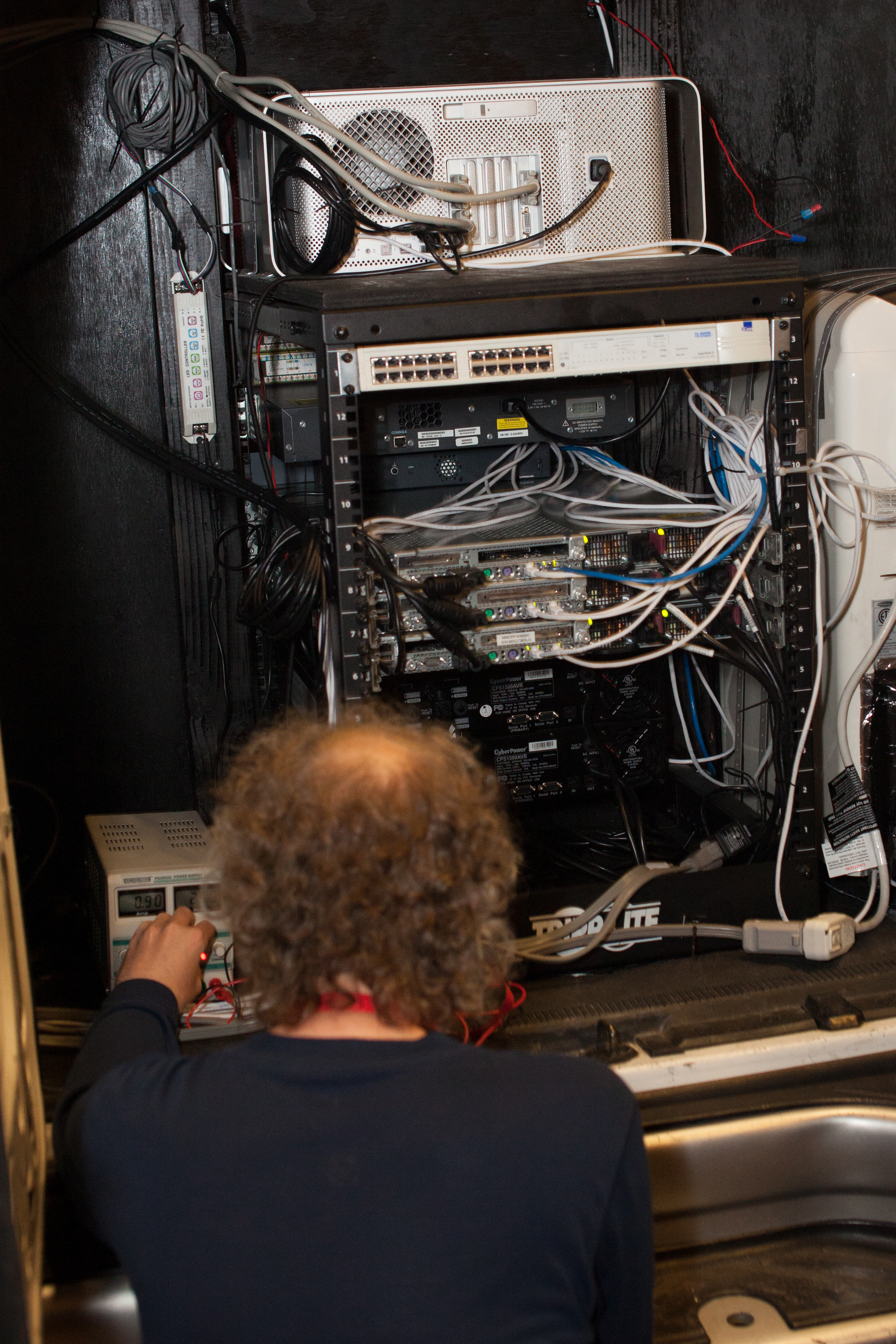
Rack in the back of the van with telecom, network, and computer equipment.

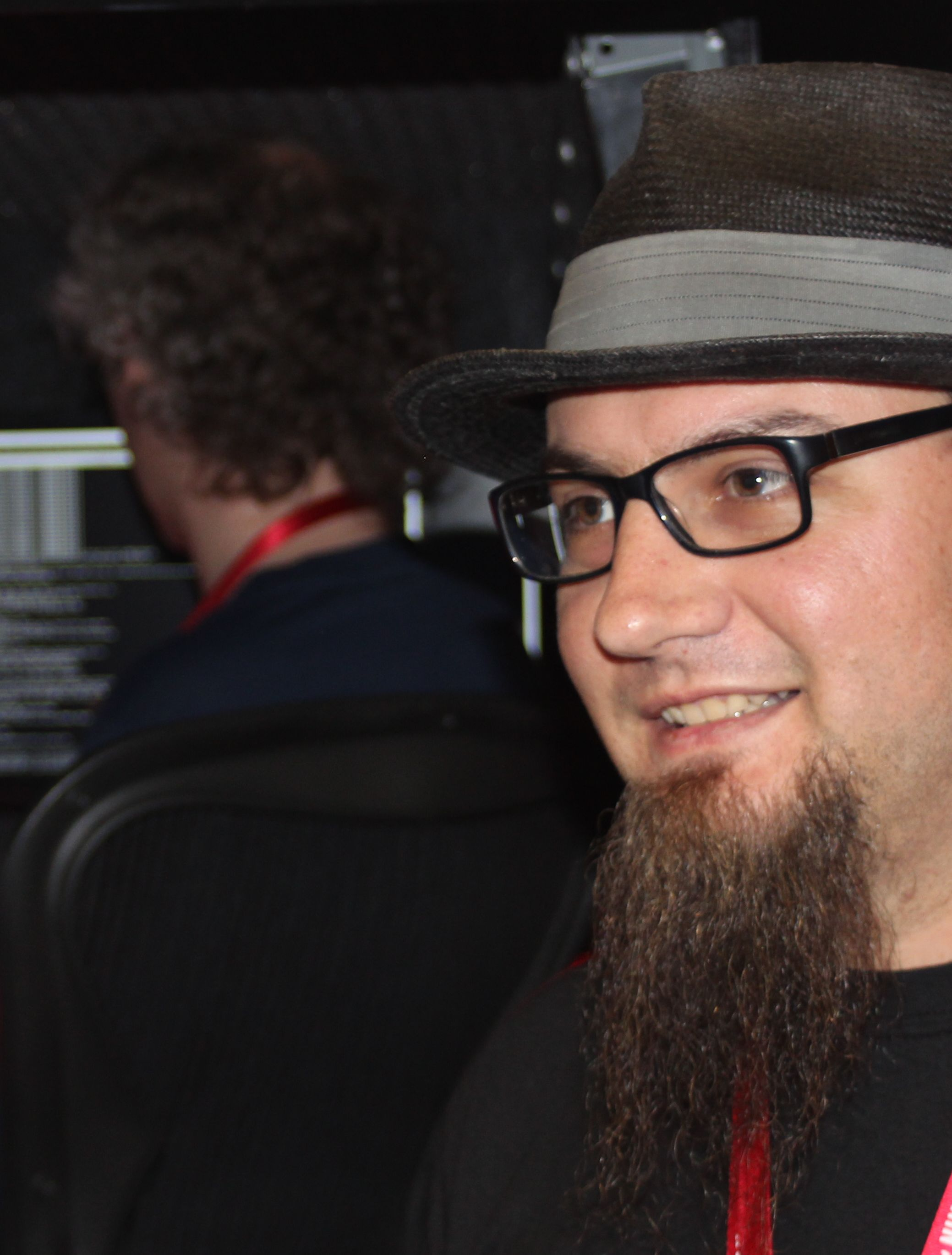
inkling and far_call from Ninja Networks
