= LAPDm =

LAPDm in telecommunications is a data link layer protocol used in GSM cellular networks. LAPDm forms Layer 2 of the Um interface between the Base Transceiver Station and Mobile station, which is to say that it is used in the radio link between the cellular network and the subscriber handset.

LAPDm is derived from a much older link layer protocol called HDLC and specified in 3GPP specifications TS 04.05 and TS 04.06. LAPDm is similar to the ISDN Layer 2, LAPD, but with these simplifications:

- LAPDm frames are always 184 bits, with segmentation for larger messages.
- LAPDm allows no more than one outstanding unacknowledged I-frame (GSM 04.06 Sections 5.8.4 and 6).
- LAPDm does not support extended header formats (GSM 04.06 Section 3).
- LAPDm supports only the SABM, DISC, DM, UI and UA U-Frames (GSM 04.06 Sections 3.4, 3.8.1).
- LAPDm supports the RR and REJ S-Frames (GSM 04.06 3.4, 3.8.1), but not RNR (GSM 04.06 Sections 3.8.7 and 6).
- LAPDm has just one internal timer, T200 (GSM 04.06 5.8).
- LAPDm supports only one terminal endpoint, whose TEI is implied.
- The BTS is always able to enter asynchronous balanced mode when requested.
- LAPDm can never be in a receiver-not-ready condition (GSM 04.06 Section 3.8.7).
- LAPDm supports only two SAPs: SAP3 for SMS and SAP0 for everything else (GSM 04.06 Sections 3.3.3 and 6).
- In SAP0, asynchronous balanced mode is always initiated by the MS (GSM 04.06 Sections 5.4.1.1 and 6).

Another important difference between LAPDm and LAPD is the establishment contention resolution procedure of GSM 04.06 Section 5.4.1.4, wherein the MS sends an L3 message in the information field of the SABM frame which is then echoed back by the BTS in the corresponding UA frame. This procedure is required in LAPDm because of the possibility of a handset accidentally attempting to use the wrong channel. LAPD does not require contention resolution, since hard-wired ISDN devices cannot accidentally use a wrong channel.

The Associated Control Procedure used in Layer 2 of the iDEN RF interface is very similar to LAPDm.
