= Self defined ethnicity =

UK government coding system

Self defined ethnicity (SDE) codes are a set of codes used by the Home Office in the United Kingdom to classify an individual's ethnicity according to that person's self-definition.

== Codes ==
The codes are also called "18 + 1" codes, as there are 18 of them, plus one code (NS) for "not stated". In addition to the previously used 16+1 codes, they contain the categories W3 and O2, while A4 is now replacing O1 (Chinese).

The code system originated in the 2001 United Kingdom census based on Recommendation 61 of the Stephen Lawrence Inquiry Report (SLIR).

British police forces are required to use the SDE 18+1 codes (as opposed to the commonly used radio shorthand IC codes) when spoken contact has taken place and an individual has been given an opportunity to state their self-perceived ethnicity.

== List of SDE codes ==
White

- W1 – British
- W2 – Irish
- W3 – Gypsy or Irish Traveller
- W9 – Any other White background

Mixed or Multiple ethnic groups

- M1 – White and Black Caribbean
- M2 – White and Black African
- M3 – White and Asian
- M9 – Any other Mixed or Multiple background

Asian or Asian British

- A1 – Indian
- A2 – Pakistani
- A3 – Bangladeshi
- A4 – Chinese
- A9 – Any other Asian background

Black, Black British, Caribbean or African

- B1 – Caribbean
- B2 – African
- B9 – Any other Black, Black British or Caribbean background

Other ethnic groups

- O2 – Arab
- O9 – Any other ethnic group

Not stated

- NS – Not Stated.

== See also ==
- Classification of ethnicity in the United Kingdom
- IC codes
