= Range Networks =

- Industry: Telecommunications
- Founded: 2011
- Headquarters: San Francisco, CA, USA
- Key people: Bob Fultz (VP of Products), Pedro Rump (VP of Engineering), Harvind Samra (Co-Founder and CTO)
- Products: RapidCell; 5150 Series; Development Kit
- Number of employees: 30+
- Website: http://rangenetworks.com/

Range Networks, Inc. is a U.S. company that provides open-source software products used to operate cellular networks. Founded in 2011, Range Networks is headquartered in San Francisco, CA, with satellite offices worldwide.

== History ==
In 2007 David Burgess and Harvind Samra created OpenBTS, subsequently releasing the source code to the public to provide cellular service to people in rural and remote regions.

In 2010 the founders incorporated as Range Networks to commercialize OpenBTS based products and deploy networks worldwide. Range Networks deployments can now be found on all seven continents including Antarctica.

In December, 2010 the company raised $12 million from Gray Ghost Ventures and Omidyar Network.

== Technology ==
Range Networks is a provider of U.S.-made commercial open source cellular systems. Using a combination of Range Networks hardware and software, network operators can build networks in which traditional GSM handsets are treated as virtual SIP endpoints. The company supports 2G, 2.5G and 3G GSM systems.

== OpenBTS Project ==
The OpenBTS Project, an open source software defined radio implementation of the GSM (Global System for Mobile communications) radio access network that presents normal GSM handsets as virtual SIP endpoints, was developed and is maintained by Range Networks. Range Networks produces proprietary software packages releasing their source code mostly under the GNU AGPL while holding copyright under single commercial entity selling commercial licenses, support and hardware.

In August 2013, Range Networks announced the release of an update to OpenBTS, providing developers with the ability to incorporate Internet access through a packet-oriented mobile data service known as General Packet Radio Service (GPRS).

== Deployments ==
Range Networks has worked with university and research groups to deploy cellular networks in rural regions around the world.

Indonesia: Partnering with UC Berkeley’s Technology and Infrastructure for Emerging Regions (TIER) research group a cellular network was established in Papua, Indonesia. In mid-2012 a wireless Internet service provider in rural Papua contacted the TIER group about setting up a low power GSM base station in a remote village in the Central Highlands of Papua. The village now has both voice and global SMS service and the network is profitable for local service providers.

Zambia: In collaboration with the UC Santa Barbara’s Mobility Management and Networking Laboratory (Moment Lab) a cellular network was deployed to study the economic feasibility of bringing cellular networks to remote regions. The deployment of the network provided the remote village of Macha in Zambia with the capability of making and receiving calls and sending and receiving local SMS messages. The network also allowed for outgoing global calls and outgoing global SMS text messages on a trial basis.

Mexico: Through a partnership with non-profit organization Rhizomatica a cellular network was established in Oaxaca, Mexico. Covering a village of approximately 2500 residents, where traditional cellular service was previously non-existent, the network is now serving over 450 residents who are able to make local and global calls and send text messages. Today, the community has its own cellular infrastructure, including billing and management of the network on their own.

Antarctica: The Australian Antarctic Division (AAD), a division of the Australian Governments Department of the Environment and Energy has used Range Networks software to provide GSM services to its four research stations. The system is currently installed and operational at Casey, Davis and Mawson Stations in Antarctica as well as the sub-Antarctic Macquarie Island station.
