= Classification of ethnicity in the United Kingdom =

National census classification of ethnicity

A number of different systems of classification of ethnicity in the United Kingdom exist. These schemata have been the subject of debate, including about the nature of ethnicity, how or whether it can be categorised, and the relationship between ethnicity, race, and nationality.

== National statistics ==
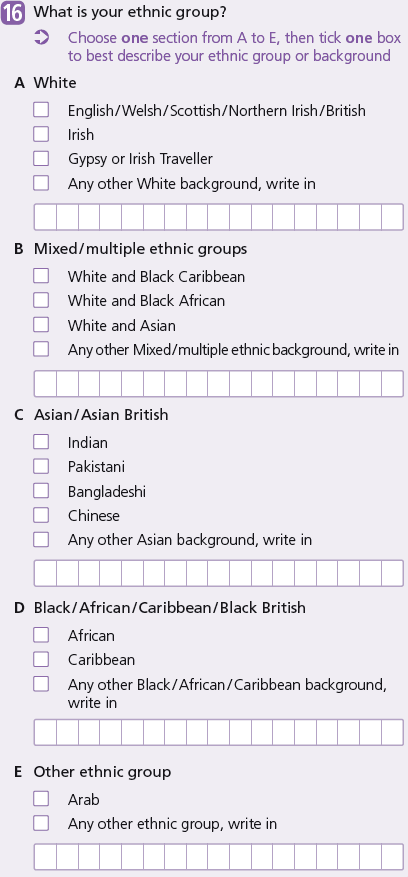
The ethnic group question used in the 2011 census in England. In Wales, "Welsh" and "English" were listed in the opposite order of the "White" column. The options in Scotland and Northern Ireland were slightly different from those in England and Wales.

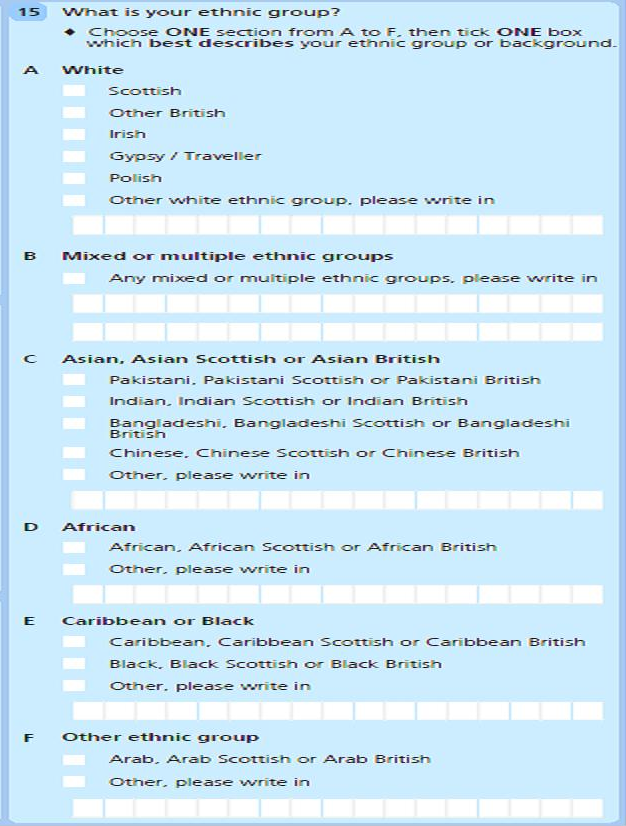
The ethnic group question used in the 2011 census in Scotland.

=== History and debate ===
The 1991 UK census was the first to include a question on ethnicity. In 1975, field trials started to establish whether a question could be devised that was acceptable to the public and would provide information on race or ethnicity that would be more reliable than questions about an individual's (and their parents') birthplaces (or nationality if born abroad) - which is what the census had asked for until this point.

A number of different questions and answer classifications were suggested and tested, culminating in the April 1989 census test. The question used in the later 1991 census was similar to that tested in 1989, and took the same format on the census forms in England, Wales and Scotland. However, the question was not asked in Northern Ireland. The tick-boxes used in 1991 were "White", "Black-Caribbean", "Black-African", "Black-Other (please describe)", "Indian", "Pakistani", "Bangladeshi", "Chinese" and "Any other ethnic group (please describe)".

In 2002, sociologist Peter J. Aspinall categorised what he regards as a number of "persistent problems with salient collective terminology". These problems are ambiguity in respect of the populations that are described by different labels, the invisibility of white minority groups in official classifications, the acceptability of the terms used to those that they describe, and whether the collectivities have any substantive meaning.

A number of academics have pointed out that the ethnicity classification employed in the census and other official statistics in the UK since 1991 involve confusion between the concepts of ethnicity and race. David I. Kertzer and Dominique Arel argue that this is the case in many censuses, and that "the case of Britain is illuminative of the recurring failure to distinguish race from ethnicity". Aspinall notes that sustained academic attention has been focused on "how the censuses measure ethnicity, especially the use of dimensions that many claim have little to do with ethnicity, such as skin colour, race, and nationality".

In 2007, Simpson and Bola Akinwale studied the stability of individuals' responses to ethnic group questions between the 1991 and 2001 census. They concluded that the membership of the "White" category was stable, whereas 7–9 per cent of those in the "Asian" group and 23 per cent of both the "Caribbean" and the "African" group in 1991 had switched to another group by 2001. They suggested that conscious changes in affiliation explained little of this instability, whereas unreliability of the question was significant, partly due to the ambiguous nature of the categories used and partly due to imprecision in the imputation of missing values.

It has been argued that the wording of the ethnicity question in the 2001 census, "What is your ethnic group?", embodies "an essential being ethnic" as opposed to "a constructed belonging to an ethnicity". The latter was reflected in a question such as "choose one box to best describe your ethnic group", which was subsequently added in the 2011 census. Sociologist Steven Vertovec argues that "much public discourse and service provision is still based on a limited set of Census categories", and that "these categories do not begin to convey the extent and modes of diversity existing within the population today".

User consultation undertaken by the Office for National Statistics (ONS) for the purpose of planning the 2011 census in England and Wales found that most of the respondents from all ethnic groups that took part in the testing felt comfortable with the use of the terms "Black" and "White". Some participants suggested that these colour terms were confusing and unacceptable, did not adequately describe an individual's ethnic group, did not reflect his or her true skin colour, and were stereotypical and outdated terms.

The heading "Black or Black British", which was used in 2001, was changed to "Black/African/Caribbean/Black British" for the 2011 census. As with earlier censuses, individuals who did not identify as "Black", "White" or "Asian" could instead write in their own ethnic group under "Other ethnic group". Persons with multiple ancestries could indicate their respective ethnic backgrounds under a "Mixed or multiple ethnic groups" tick box and write-in area.

Between 2004 and 2008, the General Register Office for Scotland (GOS) conducted official consultation, research and question testing for the purpose of planning the 2011 Scottish census, with key evidence informing the new classification drawn from similar workshops carried out by the Office for National Statistics, the Welsh Assembly Government (WAG), and the Northern Ireland Statistics and Research Agency (NISRA). The GOS found that "Black" was a polarising term for many focus group participants and interviewees. Some participants opposed the use of such terms, while others supported them.

Opposition to the term "Black" was strongest among individuals originating from ethnic groups in Africa and the Caribbean, especially the former. The main reasons cited for this opposition were that racial terms like "Black" and "White" were invalid, socially constructed concepts not based on empirical reality; that skin colour was distinct from ethnicity; that the "Black" and "White" categories from the earlier 2001 census were inconsistent with the "Asian" categories, thereby resulting in an unfair, double standard; and that the positioning of the "White" category atop the "non-White" categories implied a racial hierarchy, with "White" at the top.

To redress this, the GOS established new, separate "African, African Scottish or African British" and "Caribbean, Caribbean Scottish or Caribbean British" tick boxes for individuals from Africa and the Caribbean, respectively, who did not identify as "Black, Black Scottish or Black British". It found that most testing participants thereafter chose to tick "African" or "Caribbean" instead of "Black". In the write-in area, they noted their own respective ethnic groups, with few opting to write-in "Black". Individuals who did not identify as "Black", "White" or "Asian" could write in their own ethnic group under "Other ethnic group". Persons with multiple ancestries could indicate their respective ethnic backgrounds under a "Mixed or multiple ethnic groups" write-in area.

There were calls for the 2011 national census in England and Wales to include extra tick boxes so people could identify their ethnic group in category A as English, Welsh and Cornish. The tick boxes at the time only included "British", Irish or any other. Some experts, community and special interest group respondents also pointed out that the 'Black African' category was too broad. They remarked that the category did not provide enough information on the considerable diversity that existed within the various populations currently classified under this heading. This concealed heterogeneity ultimately made the gathered data of limited use analytically. To remedy this, the Muslim Council of Britain proposed that this census category should be broken down instead into specific ethnic groups.

The National Association of British Arabs (NABA) and other Arab organisations also lobbied for the inclusion of a separate "Arab" entry, which would include under-reported groups from the Arab world such as Syrians, Yemenis, Somalis and Maghrebis. NABA reasoned that "lack of recognition of Arabs as a separate ethnic group, and hence their exclusion, has serious consequences for the planning of services and monitoring of such problems as racial discrimination".

The specimen 2011 Census questions were published in 2009 and included new "Gypsy or Irish Traveller" and "Arab" categories. The final version of the census form included tick-boxes for "Gypsy or Irish Traveller" under the "White" heading, and "Arab" under the "Other ethnic group" heading. However, in the ONS's testing in England and Wales prior to the census, no Kurdish, Iranian, Berber, Somali or Egyptian participants chose to identify as Arab.

Discussing the inclusion of nationalities such as "British" and "Irish" in the ethnic group categories of the census, Nissa Finney and Ludi Simpson argue that "on purely technical grounds, this is a mistake, confirmed by enumerators reporting that some Asian respondents had ticked 'British', having seen it as the first box and wishing to confirm their British identity and nationality". Samira Shackle, writing in the New Statesman, argues that "the fact that hundreds of thousands choose to describe their own ethnicity as Welsh, Scottish, or Cornish shows that 'ethnic British' is a nebulous concept".

=== Self-definition ===
The ethnicity data used in UK national statistics relies on individuals' self-definition. The Office for National Statistics explain this as follows:

Is a person's ethnic group self-defined? Yes. Membership of an ethnic group is something that is subjectively meaningful to the person concerned, and this is the principal basis for ethnic categorisation in the United Kingdom. So, in ethnic group questions, we are unable to base ethnic identification upon objective, quantifiable information as we would, say, for age or gender. And this means that we should rather ask people which group they see themselves as belonging to.

This self-defined categorisation was also used for classifying ethnicity in the 2001 UK census. Slightly different categories were employed in Scotland and Northern Ireland, as compared with England and Wales, "to reflect local differences in the requirement for information". However, the data collected still allow for comparison across the UK. Different classifications were used in the 1991 Census, which was the first to include a question on ethnicity.

=== Ethnicity categories ===
The following are the options the ONS currently recommends for ethnicity surveys:

England and Wales	Northern Ireland	Scotland
White
English/Welsh/Scottish/Northern Irish/British		Scottish
		Other British
Irish
Gypsy or Irish traveller	Irish Traveller	Gypsy or Irish Traveller
		Polish
Any other White background, please describe		Any other White ethnic group, please describe
Mixed / multiple ethnic groups		Mixed or Multiple ethnic groups
White and Black Caribbean		
White and Black African		
Any other Mixed / Multiple ethnic background, please describe		Any Mixed or Multiple ethnic groups, please describe
Asian / Asian British		Asian, Asian Scottish or Asian British
Indian		Indian, Indian Scottish or Indian British
Pakistani		Pakistani, Pakistani Scottish or Pakistani British
Bangladeshi		Bangladeshi, Bangladeshi Scottish or Bangladeshi British
Chinese		Chinese, Chinese Scottish or Chinese British
Any other Asian, please describe
Black / African / Caribbean / Black British		
African		African
		African, African Scottish or African British
		Any other African, please describe
Caribbean		Caribbean or Black
		Caribbean, Caribbean Scottish or Caribbean British
		Black, Black Scottish or Black British
Any other Black / African / Caribbean background, please describe		Any other Caribbean or Black, please describe
Other ethnic group
Arab		Arab, Arab Scottish or Arab British
Any other ethnic group, please describe

In addition to the above "tick-box" options, respondents can also make use of the "please describe" options, also known as "write-in" answers. To do this, they would have to select one of the "any other" tick-boxes on the census form and write in their answer in the box provided.

== Police ==
Code	Ethnicity
IC1	White - North European
IC2	White - South European
IC3	Black
IC4	Asian - Indian subcontinent
IC5	Chinese, Japanese, Korean or other Southeast Asian
IC6	Arab or North African
IC9	Unknown

The police services of the UK began to classify arrests in racial groups in 1975, but later replaced the race code with an Identity Code (IC) system.

One of the recommendations of the Stephen Lawrence Inquiry was that people stopped and searched by the police should have their self-defined ethnic identity recorded. In March 2002, the Association of Chief Police Officers proposed a new system for self-definition, based on the 2001 census. From April 2003, police forces were required to use this new system. Police forces and civil and emergency services, the NHS and local authorities in England and Wales may refer to this as the "6+1" system, named after the 6 classifications of ethnicity plus one category for "not stated".

The IC classification is still used for descriptions of suspects by police officers amongst themselves, but does risk incorrectly identifying a victim, a witness or a suspect compared to that person's own description of their ethnicity. When a person is stopped by a police officer exercising statutory powers and asked to provide information under the Police and Criminal Evidence Act, they are asked to select one of the five main categories representing broad ethnic groups and then a more specific cultural background from within this group. Officers must record the respondent's answer, not their own opinion. The "6+1" IC code system remains widely used, when the police are unable to stop a suspect and ask them to give their self-defined ethnicity.

Code	Ethnicity
	Asian or Asian British
A1	Indian
A2	Pakistani
A3	Bangladeshi
A9	Any other Asian background
	Black or Black British
B1	Caribbean
B2	African
B9	Any other Black background
	Mixed
M1	White and Black Caribbean
M2	White and Black African
M3	White and Asian
M9	Any other mixed background
	Chinese or any other ethnic group
O1	Chinese
O9	Any other ethnic group
	White
W1	British
W2	Irish
W9	Any other White background
	+1 codes
N1	The officer's presence is urgently required elsewhere
N2	The situation involves public disorder
N3	The person did not understand what is required
N4	The person declined to define their ethnicity

== Schools ==
The Department for Education's annual school census collects data on pupils in nurseries, primary, middle, secondary and special schools. This includes ethnicity data for pupils who are aged 5 or over at the beginning of the school year in August. The guidance notes on data collection note that ethnicity is a personal, subjective awareness, and that pupils and their parents can refuse to answer the ethnicity question.

The codes used are based on the categories used in the 2001 UK census, with added "Travellers of Irish heritage", "Gypsy/Roma heritage" and "Sri Lankan Other" categories. If these codes are judged to not meet local needs, local authorities may use a Department for Education approved list of extended categories. The National Pupil Database attempts to match pupils' educational attainment to their characteristics gathered in the school census, including ethnicity. However, according to HM Inspectorate for Education and Training in Wales, the database contains data inaccuracies.

A few of the local authorities and schools had also never accessed the repository, and some of these institutions were unaware of its existence. The NPD was also used least by the majority of local authorities and schools, with 65 per cent deeming this method of educational data analysis to be of limited use, about 23 per cent considering it to be fairly useful, and only around 11 per cent regarding it as being very useful. Most schools and local authorities instead used the Welsh Assembly Government's national free school meal (FSM) benchmark data, which ranks a school's performance relative to other groups of schools with comparable free school meal levels. Around 55 per cent of schools and local authorities deemed the benchmark data very useful, 35 per cent considered it fairly useful, and only about 10 per cent regarded it as being of limited use.

Researchers conducting analysis for the London Borough of Lambeth have argued that broad ethnic groupings such as "black African" or "white other" can hide significant variation in educational performance, so they instead recommend the use of language categories.

== Healthcare ==
The ethnic group categories used in the National Health Service in England are based on the 2001 census. It has been argued that this causes problems, as other agencies such as social services use the newer 2011 census categories. In Scotland, the 2011 Scottish census categories are now used. In 2011, Scotland started to record ethnicity on death certificates, becoming the first country in the world to do so. Ethnicity data is not routinely recorded on birth certificates in any part of the UK.

Whether the official UK ethnic group classifications are useful for research on health is the subject of debate. Peter Aspinall argues that the 2001 census categories fail to adequately break down the "white" group and ignore ethno-religious differences between South Asian groups, amongst other issues.

In 2005, writing in the Journal of Epidemiology and Community Health, Charles Agyemang, Raj Bhopal and Marc Bruijnzeels argue that: "The current groupings of African descent populations in the USA and the UK such as Black, Black African, and African American hide the huge heterogeneity within these groups, which weakens the value of ethnic categorisation as a means of providing culturally appropriate health care, and in understanding the causes of ethnic differences in disease. Such broad terms may not fit with self definition of ethnicity".

== Collective terms for minority ethnic groups ==
Since the Second World War, many minority groups in the UK were collectively referred to as "coloured", a term deprecated and perceived as offensive in modern-day usage. From the 1970s until the early 1990s, those who subscribed to the notion of political blackness used the term "black" to refer to all ethnic minorities in the UK; however, this also came under scrutiny in the 1990s, especially from British Asians, who did not feel "black".

A number of terms have been used, by government and more generally, to refer to the collective ethnic-minority population. These include "black and minority ethnic" (BME), "black, Asian and minority ethnic" (BAME) and "black and ethnic minority" (BEM). These terms have been criticised on a number of grounds, including for excluding national minorities such as the Cornish, Welsh, Scottish and Northern Irish from the definition of ethnic minorities, for suggesting that black people (and Asian people — specifically the South Asians in the case of "BAME") are racially separate from the ethnic minority population, and for including under a single label heterogenous groups with little in common with each other.

A November 2020 survey found that the term "BAME" offended those whom it attempts to describe, with the phrase "ethnically diverse communities" preferred when speaking broadly, and with relevant specific terms favored when referring to a specific community or person. In December 2021, the BBC, ITV, Channel 4 and Channel 5 committed not to use the term "BAME", in order to provide better representation of specific ethnic groups.

In November 2022, the Labour-run Westminster City Council committed to replace "BAME" with "global majority". However, Conservative MP John Hayes remarked that the change was "deeply sinister and must be resisted at every turn."

== See also ==
- Demographics of the United Kingdom
- Working class
