= Capture (TV series) =

American reality competition television series

- Also known as: The Hunt
- Genre: Reality competition
- Presented by: Luke Tipple
- Country of origin: United States
- Original language: English
- No. of seasons: 1
- No. of episodes: 10

Production
- Executive producers: Brady Connell; David Garfinkle; Jay Renfroe; Sean Foley; Shye Sutherland
- Running time: 42 minutes
- Production companies: CBS Television Studios; Warner Horizon Television; Renegade 83 Entertainment

Original release
- Network: The CW
- Release: July 30 – September 25, 2013

Capture is an American reality competition television series on The CW that is hosted by Luke Tipple and premiered on July 30, 2013.

== Format ==
Capture, brings twelve teams of two to a 4,000-acre wilderness area called the Arena to participate in hunts to eliminate other teams as the $250,000 grand prize. The competition lasts for a month, and the teams, while still in the game, reside in a small camp named the Village and given meager food and rations, and otherwise forced to rely on survival skills for other resources. Teams are identified by matching color jackets they wear, and must stay together throughout the game. During hunts, each player wears a special vest mounted with an over-the-shoulder camera, as well as an armband mounted with a screen that can be used to display a map of the area, the team's current location, and other information during the hunt.

== Gameplay ==
The competition is divided into two-day cycles, each day featuring one four-hour hunt. At the start of each cycle, one team is randomly selected as the Hunt team, and the remaining teams are Prey. Over the course of these two days, the Hunt team stays at the Lodge, a special part of the camp with better shelter and improved provisions. They are also allowed to invite one other team to join them for the night between hunts. The Hunt team is challenged to capture two teams during the two hunts. They are given the opportunity to capture one team during the first hunt, and if they fail to do so, they can attempt to make two captures during the second hunt. The Prey teams are given a few minutes head start at the beginning of each hunt before the Hunt team follows them. A team is captured by the Hunt team by attaching their activated Talons (small metal, magnetic disks) onto the vest of either member of a Prey team. The Talon is only active for a few minutes after which the Hunt team must wait for some time before they can attempt capture again. The Hunt team is given no special information about the locations of the other teams, however if a Prey team remains still for more than three minutes, the Hunt team is shown the location of this team on their armband display. The hunt is concluded once a team is captured or time runs out. Teams that are captured are kept in a cage-like area of camp and are given limited provisions and minimal shelter compared to the other teams.

=== Advantages ===
During a hunt, an Advantage may be placed on the field. The first team to reach the Advantage gains an ability, which may vary from hunt to hunt. Each team is shown the location of the Advantage; teams may either pursue the Advantage in an effort to reach it first, or avoid the Advantage in order to minimize the probability of an encounter with the Hunt team. In certain cases, all Prey team alarms may be active during a hunt until the Advantage has been claimed. Advantages featured in Season 1 include:

- Sabotage of a specific competitor, which may include:
  - Activating alarms on a competitor teams' vests
  - Forcing a competitor team to be joined by a cable for the remainder of the hunt
  - Forcing a member of a competitor team to wear an elevation mask, which restricts breathing and vision
  - Containment of a prey team to a small area within the playing field during the hunt
- Hunt team overthrow, in which case the successful Prey team receives the privileges of the current Hunt team and selects a new Hunt team for the subsequent day
- Looking glasses, which allow teams to see a map, which includes the position of all other teams (including the Hunt team), on their armband for several minutes.
- Digital land mines, which the awarded Prey team may place at locations of their choosing. Digital land mines are triggered when another Prey team approaches within 100 feet of the mine's location; when activated, they notify the Hunt team of their location and warn the nearby Prey team accordingly.

=== Supply stations ===
Supply points may be available for all Prey teams, though they are only available for one hour. A supply point is a safety zone which the Hunt team may not enter, and contains one or more advantageous items that Prey teams may claim in order of arrival. Items located at supply stations have included:

- Rations for subsequent meals
- Supplementary rations consumed at the supply station
- Alcoholic beverages
- Additional camping gear
- Phone-calls to loved ones

=== Elimination ===
On the night of the second day, between one and two teams are eligible for elimination, depending on the Hunt team's success in capturing Prey.

- If no teams have been captured, the Hunt team is the only team eligible for elimination and is automatically eliminated
- If one team has been captured, the Hunt team and the captured team are both eligible for elimination
- If two teams have been captured, both captured Prey teams are eligible for elimination

In the latter two cases, the eliminated team is determined by vote of non-eligible teams; in the case of a tie, the Hunt team casts the tie-breaking vote.

=== Environment ===
Capture was filmed in an area of wilderness just northeast of Shaver Lake in eastern California (37°08′26″N 119°15′47″W). The terrain is mostly dry, wooded, and hilly and located around 6,000 ft above sea level, making breathing difficult. Environmental conditions play a factor in gameplay, as players must tolerate near-freezing temperatures at night while sleeping in basic bunks, blankets, and tarps; the occasional rain or hailstorm; and other elements of wilderness survival. Movement injuries (such as sprained joints) are common as a result of fast movement over the varied (and occasionally rugged) terrain.

=== Final hunt ===
Once only two teams remain, the final hunt starts with both teams as Prey, and are given separate locations where they can find their Talons. The first team to acquire their Talons becomes the Hunt team, but the roles then switch every fifteen minutes afterwards. The first team to capture the other while they are the Hunt team wins the game.

== Production ==
=== Technology ===
Capture uses the NinjaTel Van to provide wireless network connectivity to the remote wilderness area.

=== TV elements ===
Capture uses reconstructions of the hunt to facilitate the production of each episode. While some scenes are from player mounted cameras and from what appear to be fixed camera positions throughout the hunt area, a substantial portion of the footage of a hunt comes from players reenactment. A disclaimer following each episode states that the reenactments have no bearing on the outcomes of the game.

== Teams ==
Contestant	Age	Hometown	Finish
Antoine Burton	21	Pittsburgh, Pennsylvania	Winners
Kareem Dawson	21	Philadelphia, Pennsylvania	Winners
Jade Ramsey	25	Bournemouth, England	Episode 10
Nikita Ramsey	25	Bournemouth, England	Episode 10
Rob Anderson	25	Chicago, Illinois	Episode 10
Jacob Kosior	26	Chicago, Illinois	Episode 10
Matt Rosado	23	Riverside, California	Episode 9
Kaliesha West	25	Moreno Valley, California	Episode 9
Arlynn Ilgenfritz	29	Boulder, Colorado	Episode 8
Kirsten Rechnitz	29	Boulder, Utah	Episode 8
Sabrina Pomilio	24	Brooklyn, New York	Episode 7
Noelle Prideaux	25	Brooklyn, New York	Episode 7
Chris Wallace	25	Cornelius, Oregon	Episode 6
Nick Wallace	23	Cornelius, Oregon	Episode 6
James Wallington	23	Grand Rapids, Michigan	Episode 5
Rebecca Wallington	21	Grand Rapids, Michigan	Episode 5
Eric Praxedes	27	Seabeck, Washington	Episode 4
Shane Steinman	27	West Palm Beach, Florida	Episode 4
Erica Madrid	21	Boulder, Colorado	Episode 3
Ryan Ford	25	Boulder, Colorado	Episode 3
Tremana White	23	Boston, Massachusetts	Episode 2
Jarick Walker	24	Boston, Massachusetts	Episode 2
Kellee Edwards	26	San Bernardino, California	Episode 1
Marlina Moreno	30	San Diego, California	Episode 1

== Summary ==
Place	Team	Episodes											Total Votes
Place	Team	1	2	3	4	5	6	7	8	9	10		Total Votes
1	Antoine & Kareem	Yellow	Pink	Red	Blue	Black	Red	-	Pink	White	Red	Winners^{3}	0
2	Jade & Nikita	-	Grey	Purple	-	Lime	Gold	-	CAUGHT	CAUGHT	CAUGHT	CAUGHT^{3}	1
3	Rob & Jacob	Yellow	Grey	CAUGHT	-	Lime	CAUGHT^{1}	-	Pink	White	OUT		5
4	Matt & Kaliesha	-	Pink	Red	Blue	Black	Red	-	Teal	OUT			2
5	Arlynn & Kirsten	Yellow	CAUGHT	Red	-	Lime	Gold	-	OUT				5
6	Sabrina & Noelle	Yellow	-	Purple	CAUGHT	CAUGHT	Gold	OUT					3
7	Chris & Nick	Yellow	Pink	Purple	Blue	Black	OUT^{1}						3
8	James & Rebecca	CAUGHT	Grey	Purple	Blue	OUT							4
9	Eric & Shane	Yellow	Grey	Purple	OUT								4
10	Ryan & Erica	-	Grey	OUT									5
11	Jarick & Tremana	Lime	OUT										5
12	Kellee & Marlina	OUT											6
Looking Glass		None	N/A	Lime	Teal	N/A	N/A	N/A	Green	N/A	N/A	N/A	
Advantage		None	Purple	White	Lime	Lime	None	Black	Teal	Green	None	None	
Sabotaged		None	Blue	Black	Blue	Red	All^{2}	White	Green^{2}	White	None	None	

This Team was the Hunt Team
This Team was the Hunt Team, but only caught 1 other team and was put up for Elimination
This Team was the Hunt Team, but could not catch any other team and was Eliminated
This Team was caught by the Hunt Team
This Team was caught by the Hunt Team, and voted out
This Team found the Mystery Box

^1During the sixth hunt, Teal won the power to overthrow the current hunt team (Gold). They chose to replace them with the Red team who had been caught by Gold the previous day. The Red team then caught Gold during the second day. Meaning that Red and Gold would be up for elimination after catching each other.

^2Alarms were set on the teams at the start of the sixth and eighth hunts

^3During the final hunt, the two teams alternated being the hunt and prey teams every 15 minutes. Green team caught the teal team while they were the hunters, making them the winners of the game.

== Ratings ==
No.	Title	Original air date	Rating/Share (18–49)	U.S. viewers (millions)
1	"The Hunt Begins"	July 30, 2013	0.4/1	0.93
2	"Hunger Strikes"	August 6, 2013	0.3/1	0.81
3	"The Blue Devils"	August 13, 2013	0.3/1	0.75
4	"Angel With a Broken Wing"	August 20, 2013	0.4/1	0.90
5	"Double Jeopardy"	August 27, 2013	0.4/1	1.00
6	"Reversal of Fortune"	September 3, 2013	0.3/1	0.84
7	"Call of the Wild"	September 10, 2013	0.4/1	0.93
8	"The Peanut Butter Pact"	September 17, 2013	0.4/1	0.95
9	"Sabotage!"	September 24, 2013	0.2/1	0.69
10	"The Final Countdown"	September 25, 2013	0.2/1	0.58
