= Mobile Allocation Index Offset =

For mobile phone technology, a mobile allocation index offset (MAIO) refers a time delay separating traffic channels. When a GSM (Global System for Mobile Communications) mobile phone is served by a cell that is hopping over a set of frequencies, the separate traffic channels hop over the allocated frequencies according to a hopping sequence number (HSN). The traffic channels with the same HSN hop over the same frequencies in the same order but are separated in time by a mobile allocation index offset (MAIO).

The smallest amount of interference on a site is achieved if it is possible to synchronize all channels on the site and separate the channels using the MAIO.

Every cell is assigned a Cell Allocation (CA) Table. This is the set of ARFCNs that are used within the Cell. The Mobile Allocation (MA) Table is a subset of this CA Table. This table contains a list of ARFCNs that the traffic channels of that cell will hop through. The MAIO gives the index into this list from which the first ARFCN will be picked by the cell to start the hopping sequence. Every mobile station will be supplied with the MA Table and MAIO for a given dedicated connection. Using the MA table and the MAIO, the mobile station will hop in the exact sequence as the cell in dedicated mode to achieve frequency diversity. Thus, the MA Table, MAIO and the Hopping Sequence Number (HSN) completely configure a hopping sequence procedure which the mobile station and the cell will follow.
