= IC code =

Police codes for ethnicity used in the UK

IC codes (identity code) or 6+1 codes are police codes used in the United Kingdom to visually describe the apparent ethnicity of a person. They originated in the late 1970s.

IC codes refer to a police officer's visual assessment of the ethnicity of a person, and are used in the quick transmission of basic visual information, such as over radio. They differ from self-defined ethnicity (SDE, or "18+1") codes, which refer to how a person describes their own ethnicity. When recording a person's details (such as in the case of a stop and search or arrest), police are required to ask for and use SDE categories where possible, even if the category chosen does not match the officer's own assessment.

IC codes have been used to record individuals' ethnicities in the Police National Computer. They have also been used in the reports on ethnicity in the criminal justice system published annually as required by the Criminal Justice Act 1991, and in some scientific research.

| Code | Ethnicity |
|---|---|
| IC1 | White – North European |
| IC2 | White – South European |
| IC3 | Black |
| IC4 | Asian – Indian subcontinent |
| IC5 | Chinese, Japanese, Korean, or other Southeast Asian |
| IC6 | Arab or North African |
| IC9 | Unknown |

== See also ==
- Classification of ethnicity in the United Kingdom
