= Absolute radio-frequency channel number =

Code used in global cellular networks

In GSM cellular networks, an absolute radio-frequency channel number (ARFCN) is a code that specifies a pair of physical radio carriers used for transmission and reception in a land mobile radio system, one for the uplink signal and one for the downlink signal. ARFCNs for GSM are defined in Specification 45.005 Section 2. There are also other variants of the ARFCN numbering scheme that are in use for other systems that are not GSM. One such example is the TETRA system that has 25 kHz channel spacing and uses different base frequencies for numbering.

Different frequencies (ARFCNs) are used for the frequency-based component of GSMs multiple access scheme (FDMA — frequency-division multiple access). Uplink/downlink channel pairs in GSM are identified by ARFCN. Together with the time-based component (TDMA — time-division multiple access) the physical channel is defined by selecting a certain ARFCN and a certain time slot. Note not to confuse this physical channel with the logical channels (e.g. BCCH — Broadcast Control Channel) that are time-multiplexed onto it under the rules of GSM Specification 05.03.

== ARFCN table for common GSM systems ==
This table shows the common channel numbers and corresponding uplink and downlink frequencies associated with a particular ARFCN, as well as the way to calculate the frequency from the ARFCN number and vice versa.

Observe this table only deals with GSM systems. There are other mobile telecommunications systems that do use ARFCN to number their channels, but they may use different offsets, channel spacing and so on.

Band	Designation	ARFCN	f_{UL} [MHz]	f_{DL} [MHz]
GSM 500	GSM 450	259−293	450.6 + 0.2·(n−259)	f_{UL}(n) + 10
GSM 500	GSM 480	306−340	479.0 + 0.2·(n−306)	f_{UL}(n) + 10
GSM 700	GSM 750	438−511	747.2 + 0.2·(n−438)	f_{UL}(n) + 30
GSM 850	GSM 850	128−251	824.2 + 0.2·(n−128)	f_{UL}(n) + 45
GSM 900	P-GSM	1−124	890.0 + 0.2·n	f_{UL}(n) + 45
GSM 900	E-GSM	0−124; 975−1023	890.0 + 0.2·n 890.0 + 0.2·(n−1024)	f_{UL}(n) + 45
GSM 900	GSM-R	0−124; 955−1023	890.0 + 0.2·n 890.0 + 0.2·(n−1024)	f_{UL}(n) + 45
GSM 1800	DCS 1800	512−885	1710.2 + 0.2·(n−512)	f_{UL}(n) + 95
GSM 1900	PCS 1900	512−810	1850.2 + 0.2·(n−512)	f_{UL}(n) + 80

== Other versions of ARFCN ==
TETRA uses different channel spacing compared to GSM systems. The standard is 25 kHz spacing and the center frequency of each channel may be offset in a number of fashions such as ±12.5 kHz or even ±6.25 kHz. This makes it more tricky to correlate the ARFCN strictly to a pair of frequencies, you need to know the specifics of the system. Also the duplex spacing is generally 10 MHz in TETRA although other versions are available for certain applications.

In TETRA the ARFCN is always given for the downlink frequency, the uplink is by standard 10 MHz lower in frequency than the downlink frequency.

In UMTS for 3G and 4G mobile telephone systems, ARFCN is replaced with UARFCN and EARFCN which are simpler and always has a direct relation between the frequency and the channel number.

=== Example ARFCN for TETRA ===
In many countries in Europe there is a standardised set of frequencies used for blue light services i.e. the police, firebrigade, rescue and so on. This set of frequencies correspond to ARFCN with a base of 300 MHz and an offset of 12.5 kHz.

To calculate the ARFCN from frequency the following method is used:

$\mathrm{ARFCN} = \frac{f - f_b - f_o}{f_c}$

Where:

f is the actual frequency [MHz]
f_{b} is the base frequency [MHz]
f_{o} is the offset frequency [MHz]
f_{c} is the channel spacing frequency [MHz]

The range of frequencies used in these tetra systems are defined by 380-385 MHz for the uplink (mobile to radio base station) paired with 390-395 MHz for the downlink (radio base station to mobile). Therefore, the base frequency f_{b} is 300 MHz (the baseband frequency to relate from) and the offset is 0.0125 MHz (12.5 kHz) and thus we get the relation:

$\mathrm{ARFCN}=\frac{f - 300 - 0.0125}{0.025}$

Inseting the frequency for the first channel 390.0125 MHz gives us an ARFCN of 3600.

Calculating the frequency from ARFCN is just the reverse of this:

$f = f_c \cdot \mathrm{ARFCN} + f_b + f_o$

== See also ==
- Mobile Allocation Index Offset
