= Base transceiver station =

Communication equipment

A base transceiver station (BTS) or a baseband unit (BBU) is a piece of equipment that facilitates wireless communication between user equipment (UE) and a network. UEs are devices like mobile phones (handsets), WLL phones, computers with wireless Internet connectivity, or antennas mounted on buildings or telecommunication towers. The network can be that of any of the wireless communication technologies like GSM, CDMA, wireless local loop, Wi-Fi, WiMAX or other wide area network (WAN) technology.

BTS is a part of a base station (BS).

Though the term BTS can be applicable to any of the wireless communication standards, it is generally associated with mobile communication technologies like GSM and CDMA. In this regard, a BTS forms part of the base station subsystem (BSS) developments for system management. It may also have equipment for encrypting and decrypting communications, spectrum filtering tools (band pass filters) and so on. Antennas may also be considered as components of BTS in general sense as they facilitate the functioning of BTS. Typically a BTS will have several transceivers (TRXs) which allow it to serve several different frequencies and different sectors of the cell (in the case of sectorised base stations). A BTS is controlled by a parent base station controller via the base station control function (BCF). The BCF is implemented as a discrete unit or even incorporated in a TRX in compact base stations. The BCF provides an operations and maintenance (O&M) connection to the network management system (NMS), and manages operational states of each TRX, as well as software handling and alarm collection. The basic structure and functions of the BTS remains the same regardless of the wireless technologies.

== General architecture ==
A BTS is usually composed of:

Transceiver (TRX)
Provides transmission and reception of signals. It also does sending and reception of signals to and from higher network entities (like the base station controller in mobile telephony). This can be separated into a dedicated device known as a Remote radio head (RRH).
Power amplifier (PA)
Amplifies the signal from TRX for transmission through antenna; may be integrated with TRX.
Combiner
Combines feeds from several TRXs so that they could be sent out through a single antenna. Allows for a reduction in the number of antenna used.
Multiplexer
For separating sending and receiving signals to/from antenna. Does sending and receiving signals through the same antenna ports (cables to antenna).
Antenna
This is the structure that the BTS lies underneath; it can be installed as it is or disguised in some way (concealed cellular sites).
Alarm extension system
Collects working status alarms of various units in the BTS and extends them to operations and maintenance (O&M) monitoring stations.
Control function
Controls and manages the various units of BTS, including any software. On-the-spot configurations, status changes, software upgrades, etc. are done through the control function.
Baseband receiver unit (BBxx)
Frequency hopping, signal DSP.

== Terms regarding a mobile BTS ==
Diversity techniques
To improve the quality of the received signal, often two receiving antennas are used, placed at a distance equal to an odd multiple of a quarter of the corresponding wavelength. For 900 MHz, this wavelength is 33 cm. This technique, known as antenna diversity or space diversity, avoids interruption caused by path fading. The antennas can be spaced horizontally or vertically. Horizontal spacing requires more complex installation, but brings better performance.

Other than antenna or space diversity, there are other diversity techniques such as frequency/time diversity, antenna pattern diversity, and polarization diversity.

Splitting refers to the flow of power within a particular area of the cell, known as a sector. Every field can therefore be considered like one new cell.

Directional antennas reduce LoRa (long-range) interference. If not sectorised, the cell will be served by an omnidirectional antenna, which radiates in all directions. A typical structure is the trisector, also known as clover, in which there are three sectors served by separate antennas. Each sector has a separate direction of tracking, typically of 120° with respect to the adjacent ones. Other orientations may be used to suit the local conditions. Bisectored cells are also implemented. These are most often oriented with the antennas serving sectors of 180° separation to one another, but again, local variations do exist.

== Gallery ==
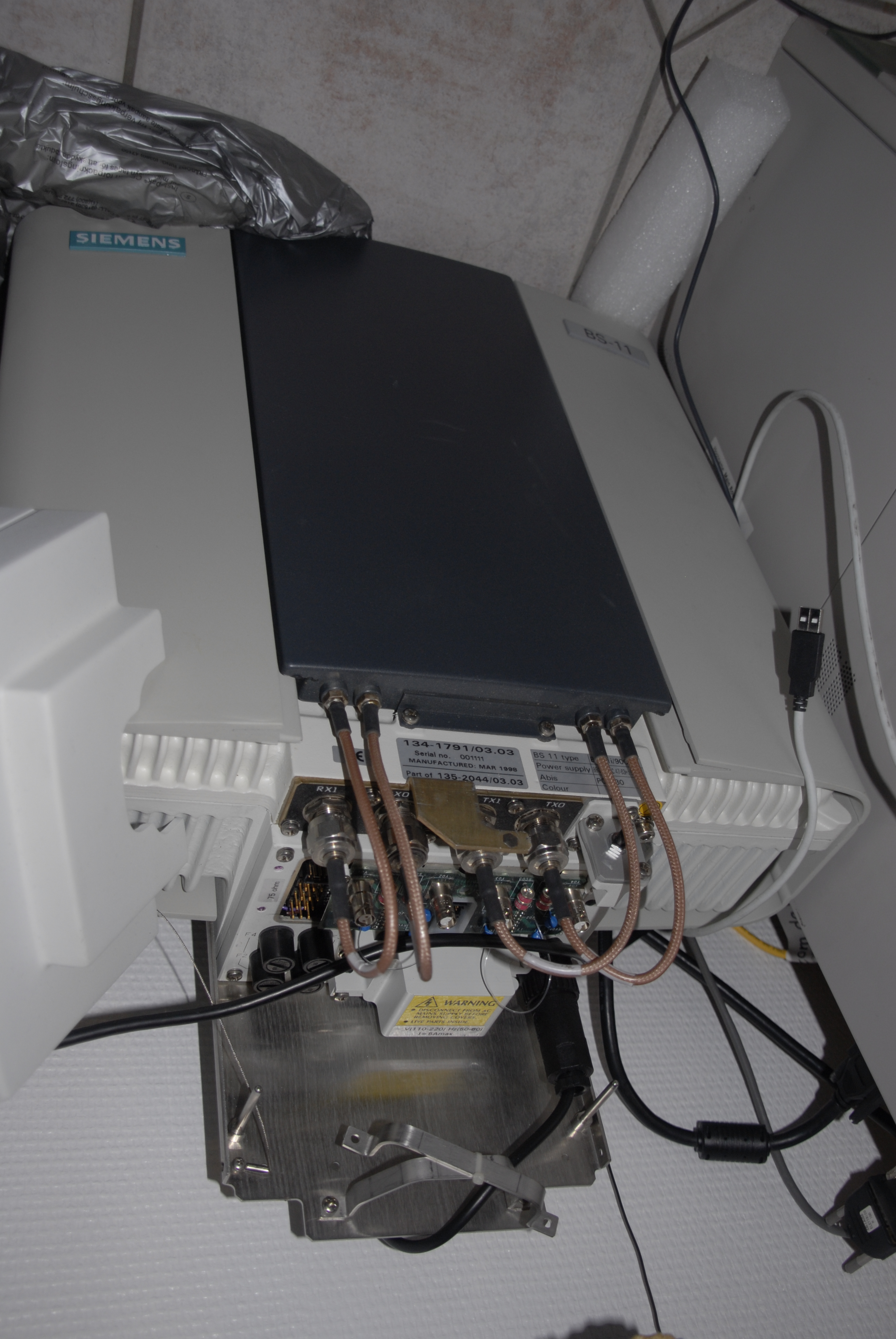
A BTS device

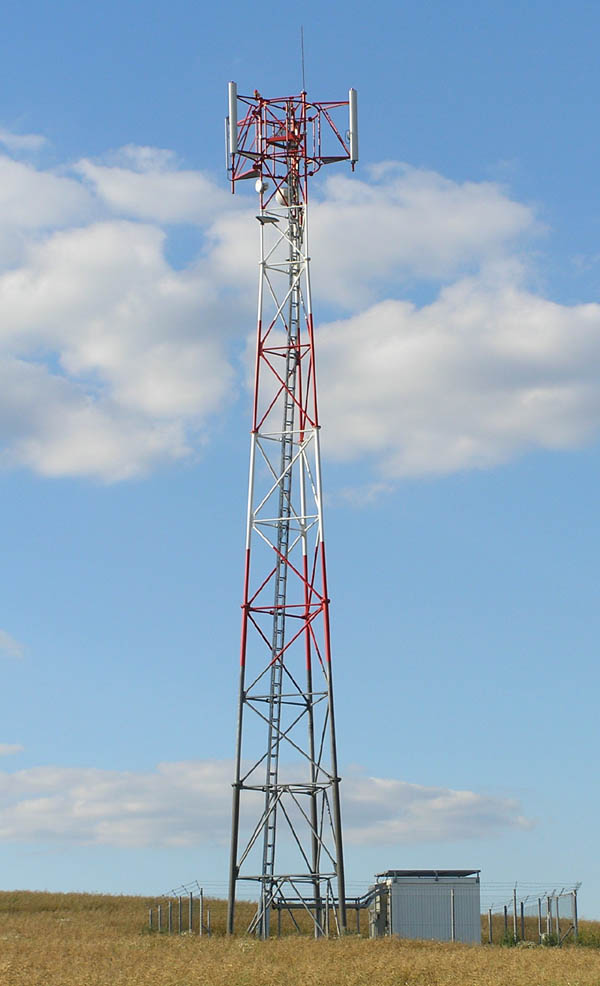
A BTS tower. The antenna is on top and the shelter housing the BTS on the right

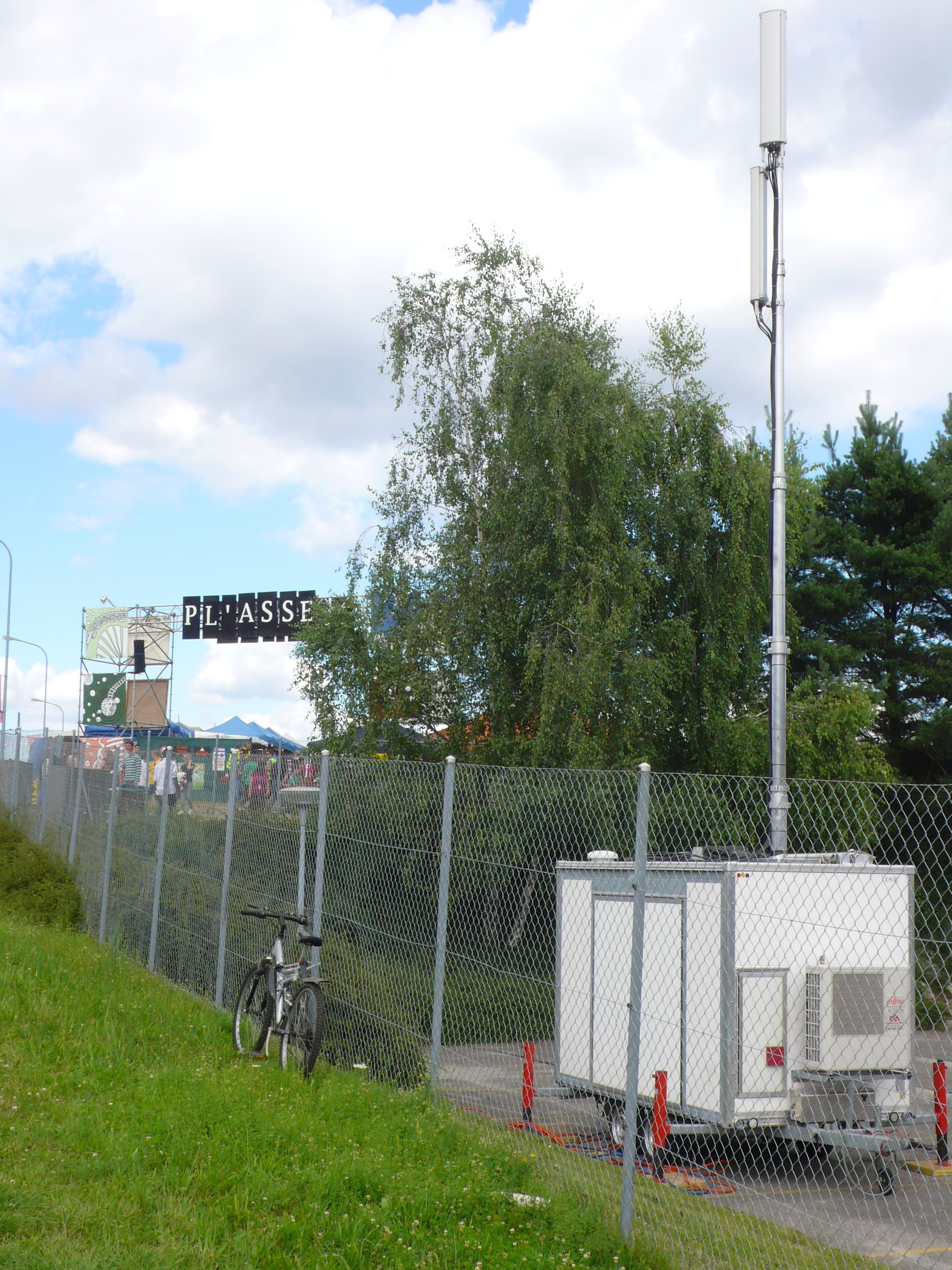
A mobile BTS

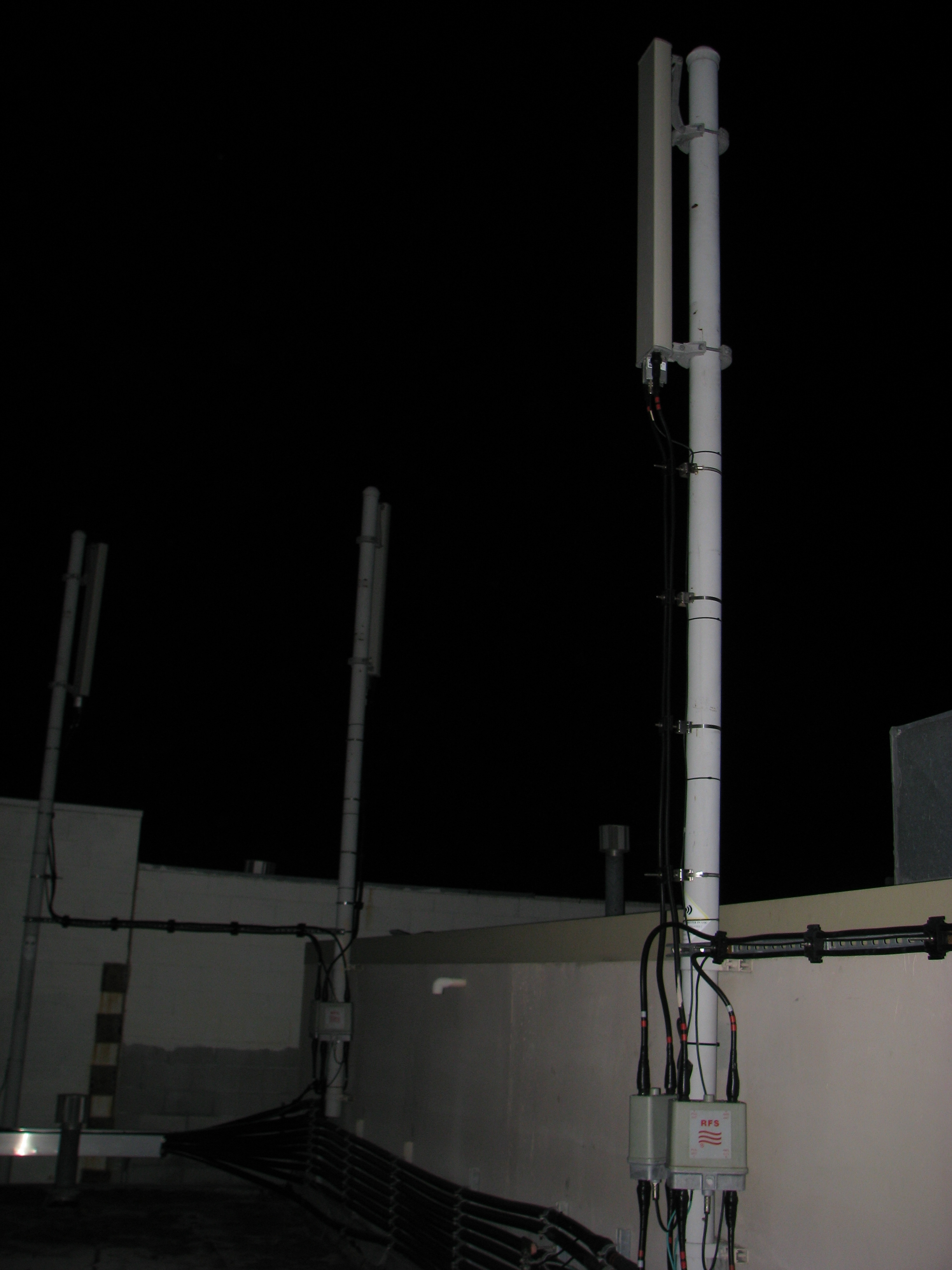
A BTS mounted on a building

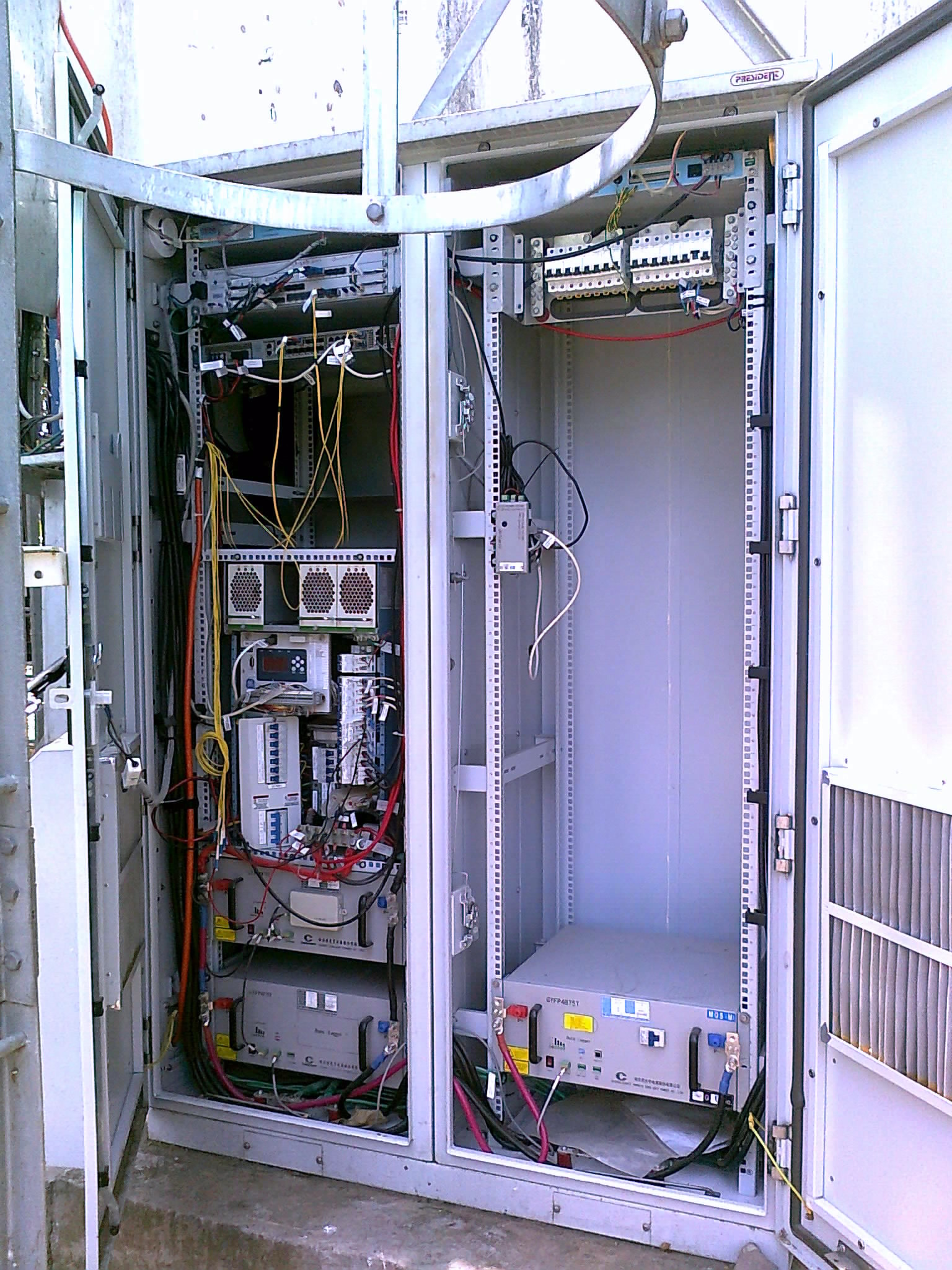
Electronic equipment box at the base of a BTS

== See also ==
- Radio access network
- Mobile cell sites
- OpenBTS
- GSM Cell ID
