= Base station identity code =

The base station identity code (BSIC) is a code used in GSM to uniquely identify a base station. The code is needed because it is possible that mobile stations receive the broadcast channel of more than one base station on the same frequency. This is due to frequency re-use in a cellular network. The BSIC is defined in GSM specification 03.03 section 4.3.2.

Each base station has its own BSIC. This code is at all times transmitted on the broadcast channel, so the mobile stations can distinguish between base stations. The BSIC is composed of a 3-bit network color code (NCC) and a 3-bit base station color code (BCC). The NCC is assigned to each network provider so the mobile station can sort out which base stations it is allowed to camp on. The NCC of different providers must be different; they must also be different in national border areas. The broadcast control channel (BCCH) of each base station is assigned a frequency by the network operator, and they must be assigned such that no neighbor stations have equal BCCH and thus equal BSIC.

As long as base stations use different frequencies for their broadcasting channel, there is no problem in using the same base station identity code. Unique identification of a base station is especially important in border areas, where at both sides of the border there is a different operator who might use the same broadcasting channel on the same frequency.
