= Media-independent handover =

Media-independent handover (MIH) is a standard being developed by IEEE 802.21 to enable the handover of IP sessions from one layer-2 access technology to another, to achieve mobility of end user devices.

== Importance ==
The importance of MIH derives from the fact that a diverse range of broadband wireless-access technologies is available and in course of development, including GSM, UMTS, CDMA2000, WiMAX, Mobile-Fi, and WPAN. Multimode wireless devices that incorporate more than one of these wireless interfaces require the ability to switch among them during the course of an IP session, and devices such as laptops with Ethernet and wireless interfaces need to switch similarly between wired and wireless access.

Handover may be required because (for example) a mobile device experiences a degradation in the radio signal, or because an access point experiences a heavy traffic load.

== Functionality ==
The key functionality provided by MIH is communication among the various wireless layers and between them and the IP layer. The required messages are relayed by the Media Independent Handover Function, MIHF, that is located in the protocol stack between the layer-2 wireless technologies and IP at layer 3. MIH may communicate with various IP protocols including Session Initiation Protocol (SIP) for signaling, Mobile IP for mobility management, and DiffServ and IntServ for quality of service (QoS).

When a session is handed off from one access point to another access point using the same technology, the handover can usually be performed within that wireless technology itself without involving MIHF or IP. For instance, a VoIP call from a Wi-Fi handset to a Wi-Fi access point can be handed over to another Wi-Fi access point within the same network, such as a corporate network, using Wi-Fi standards such as 802.11f and 802.11r. However, if the handover is from a Wi-Fi access point in a corporate network to a public Wi-Fi hotspot, then MIH is required, since the two access points cannot communicate with each other at the link layer, and are, in general, on different IP subnets.

When a session is handed off from one wireless technology to another, MIH may assist the handover process by exchanging messages among the Internet access technologies and IP. Message are of three types:

- Event notifications are passed from a lower layer in the protocol stack to a higher layer or between the MIHF of one device to the MIHF of another device. For instance “wireless link quality is degrading” is an event notification that is passed from the wireless layer to the MIHF layer.
- Commands are passed down the protocol stack or between the MIHF of one device to the MIHF of another device. For instance, “Initiate Handover” is a command in which the access point MIHF provides the mobile device MIHF with a list of alternative access points that it could use.
- Information Service is of three types. A higher layer may request information from a lower layer; for example, the MIHF may request performance information, such as delay from the wireless layer. A lower layer may request information from a higher layer; for example, the MIHF may request to know the ISP Name from the IP layer. One MIHF may request information from another MIHF, such as the availability of location-based services.

== Implementation ==
The MIH function, MIHF, is implemented:

- in mobile devices that have more than one wireless/wired interface;
- in access points that have at least one wireless interface;
- in core network equipment that may have no wireless interface.

Mobile devices and access points clearly need to implement MIHF in order to communicate in a standard way between each other and between the wireless and IP layers. This allows them to make their own local decisions as to whether and how to hand over a session. The reason for MIHF in core network equipment with no wireless interface is to enable the design of “handover servers” which can make centralized decisions about the handover of sessions among multiple access points and multiple access technologies. Such servers allow a wireless network operator to balance the traffic load so as to alleviate congestion on specific access points, and deliver sufficient quality of service to all users.

== Quality of service ==
Short-lived sessions such as accessing a single web page typically do not require handover or QoS. Longer duration sessions, which may well require handover, such as VoIP, audio/video streaming (including live TV and VoD), and VPNs, typically have QoS requirements including delay, delay variation, and packet loss.

It is important that QoS is maintained, not just before and after a handover, but also during the handover, and this can be achieved by using MIH to plan ahead. Before a handover is required, the MIHFs communicate to identify which access points using which wireless technologies are within range and what QoS is available from them. MIH can also be used to pre-authenticate the mobile device with alternative potential access points and to reserve capacity prior to handover. For instance, WiMAX allows resources to be reserved for a session before they are actually allocated to that session. When a handover becomes necessary, much of the ground-work is therefore already in place, and the session can be handed over with minimal delay and packet loss. Incoming packets to the mobile device that are delivered to the old access point after the handover can be forwarded via the new access point, thus further reducing packet loss.

QoS is handled differently by each technology, including both the wireless access technologies and also IP, which has two QoS approaches, DiffServ and IntServ. Some technologies divide traffic into “Service Classes”, such as streaming, while others allow users to specify quantitative “QoS Parameters”, such as transfer delay. WiFi, Mobile-Fi, and DiffServ use the service-class approach and although they do not have exactly the same service classes, it is possible to make a correspondence among them. WiMAX and IntServ use the QoS parameter approach, and UMTS uses both approaches. Again, correspondences among parameters can be made.

MIH can be used to exchange information about service class and QoS parameter availability from one wireless technology to another and to the IP layer. One source of such information is performance measurements made by the wireless layer, such as 802.11k for WiFi and 802.16f for WiMAX.

== Example MIH Scenario ==
To illustrate the operation of MIH, take an example of a real-time gaming application, using DiffServ at the IP layer, being handed over from Mobile-Fi to WiMAX. The application is currently using the Assured Forwarding Class 1, AF1, DiffServ service, and the Class 2 Real-Time Interactive Mobile-Fi service.

Since the MIH standard is not yet finalized, this example is illustrative of the type of functionality that may be provided, as opposed to a guarantee of what will become available. Also, the standard specifies the MIH messages. The use of those messages in any particular application is implementation-dependent. The example below is for illustrative purposes only.

1. The mobile device notices a degradation in the Mobile-Fi wireless signal strength and uses the MIH Event Notification Service to inform the MIHF layer in the mobile device. This information is passed to the MIHF in the access point.
2. The access point uses the MIH Command Service to tell the mobile device to initiate handover and includes a list of potential access points.
3. The mobile device MIHF passes this list to its various wireless layers and, using the MIH Information Service, requests them to determine the signal strength of each access point and report back to the MIHF.
4. The MIHF in the mobile device determines that the best signal strength comes from a WiMAX access point, and passes that information to its IP layer, using the Event Notification Service.
5. DiffServ at the IP layer in the mobile device uses the Information Service to request performance information from the WiMAX access point. This request is passed through the mobile device MIHF, via the WiMAX access point MIHF, to the WiMAX access point wireless layer.
6. The WiMAX layer in the access point uses IEEE 802.16f to obtain the performance information and reports back that it can schedule the session using its Unsolicited Grant Service, UGS, with a link delay of 5 ms, or on its Real-Time Polling Service with a link delay of 18 ms.
7. DiffServ selects the WiMAX UGS, and uses the MIH Command Service to tell the mobile device to commit to handover. It may also use Mobile IP if a change in the mobile device IP address is required.

== Related Standards ==
Another standard that can be used for handover from one wireless technology to another is UMA, Unlicensed Mobile Access, which provides handover between WiFi and GSM/GPRS/UMTS. It was originally developed by an independent industry consortium and was incorporated into the 3GPP standards in 2005 under the name GAN (Generic Access Network).

Another standard of interest is 802.11u, which provides roaming between 802.11 networks and other networks, so that services from one network can be accessed when the user is subscribed to services from another network. However, it does not provide handover of IP sessions in progress.

== See also ==
- Load balancing (computing)
- Multihoming
- Vertical handover
- Access Network Discovery and Selection Function
