= Vertical handover =

Vertical handover or vertical handoff refers to a network node changing the type of connectivity it uses to access a supporting infrastructure, usually to support node mobility. For example, a suitably equipped laptop might be able to use both high-speed wireless LAN and cellular technology for Internet access. Wireless LAN connections generally provide higher speeds, while cellular technologies generally provide more ubiquitous coverage. Thus the laptop user might want to use a wireless LAN connection whenever one is available and to revert to a cellular connection when the wireless LAN is unavailable. Vertical handovers refer to the automatic transition from one technology to another in order to maintain communication. This is different from a horizontal handover between different wireless access points that use the same technology.

Vertical handoffs between WLAN and UMTS (WCDMA) have attracted a great deal of attention in all the research areas of the 4G wireless network, due to the benefit of utilizing the higher bandwidth and lower cost of WLAN as well as better mobility support and larger coverage of UMTS. Vertical handovers among a range of wired and wireless access technologies including WiMAX can be achieved using Media independent handover which is standardized as IEEE 802.21.

== Related issues ==
=== Dual mode card ===
To support vertical handover, a mobile terminal needs to have a dual mode card, for example one that can work under both WLAN and UMTS frequency bands and modulation schemes.

=== Interworking architecture ===
For the vertical handover between UMTS and WLAN, there are two main interworking architecture: tight coupling and loose coupling. The tight coupling scheme, which 3GPP adopted, introduces two more elements: WAG (Wireless Access Gateway) and PDG (Packet Data Gateway). So the data transfers from WLAN AP to a Corresponding Node on the internet must go through the Core Network of UMTS.

Loose coupling is more used when the WLAN is not operated by cellular operator but any private user. So the data transmitted through WLAN will not go through Cellular Networks.

=== Handover metrics ===
In traditional handovers, such as a handover between cellular networks, the handover decision is based mainly on RSS (Received Signal Strength) in the border region of two cells, and may also be based on call drop rate, etc. for resource management reasons. In vertical handover, the situation is more complex. Two different kinds of wireless networks normally have incomparable signal strength metrics, for example, WLAN compared to UMTS. In, WLAN and UMTS networks both cover an area at the same time. The handover metrics in this situation should include RSS, user preference, network conditions, application types, cost etc.

=== Handover decision algorithm ===
Based on the handover metrics mentioned above, the decision about how and when to switch the interface to which network will be made. Many papers have given reasonable flow charts based on the better service and lower cost, etc. while some others, using fuzzy logic, neuron network or MADM methods to solve the problem.

=== Mobility management ===
When a mobile station transfers a user's session from one network to another, the IP address will change. In order to allow the Corresponding Node that the MS is communicating with to find it correctly and allow the session to continue, Mobility Management is used. The Mobility Management problem can be solved in different layers, such as the Application Layer, Transport Layer, IP Layer, etc. The most common method is to use SIP (Session Initiation Protocol) and Mobile IP.

=== Handoff procedure ===
The handover procedure specifies the control signalling used to perform the handover and is invoked by the handover decision algorithm.

== See also ==
- Load balancing (computing)
- Media-independent handover
- Multihoming
- Access network discovery and selection function

== Related standards ==
- 3GPP TS 23.234 “3GPP system to WLAN interworking; System description
- 3GPP TS 23.228 IP Multimedia Subsystem
- 3GPP TS 23.237 IP Multimedia Subsystem (IMS) Service Continuity; Stage 2
- 802.21 Media independent handover
- IEEE 802.21
- Mobile IP
