= Generic Advertisement Service =

IEEE network service

Generic Advertisement Service (GAS) is an IEEE 802.11u service that provides over-the-air transportation for frames of higher-layer advertisements between Wi-Fi stations (802.11 Stations) or between a server in an external network and a station. GAS may be used by stations prior to authentication, or association to a wireless access point (AP) in a basic service set (BSS). GAS supports higher-layer protocols that employ a query/response mechanism.

In a BSS infrastructure, the purpose of Generic Advertisement Service (GAS) is to enable a station to identify the availability of information related to network services.

While the specification of network services information is out of scope of IEEE 802.11, there is a need for stations to query for information on network services provided by SSPNs or other external networks beyond an AP (Access Point) before they associate to the wireless LAN. GAS defines a generic container to advertise network services information over an IEEE 802.11 network. Public Action frames are used to transport this information.

There are a number of reasons why providing information pre-association is beneficial.

- It supports more informed decision making about an IEEE 802.11 infrastructure with which to associate. This is generally more efficient than requiring a non-AP STA to associate with an AP before discovering the information and then deciding whether or not to stay associated.
- It is possible to query multiple networks in parallel.
- The station can discover information about APs that are not part of the same administrative group as the AP with which it is associated, supporting the selection of an AP belonging to a different IEEE 802.11 infrastructure that has an appropriate SSP roaming agreement in place.

== See also ==
- Generic Access Network
- GSM
- GPRS
- UMTS
- CDMA
- EV-DO
- IEEE 802.21 Media Independent Handover
