= MIH =

MIH or Mih may refer to:

- Matilda International Hospital, a hospital in The Peak, Hong Kong
- Media independent handover, in wireless networking
- Mills Hill railway station, England, National Rail station code
- Mobility in Harmony Consortium, an open electric vehicle development platform
- Molar incisor hypomineralisation, in dentistry
- Müllerian inhibiting hormone
- Musee International d'Horlogerie, a horology museum in La Chaux-de-Fonds, Switzerland
- Istarski mih, a Croatian bagpipe
- Miles per hour, a less common abbreviation of the unit of speed
