= ANDSF =

ANDSF may refer to:

- Access network discovery and selection function, part of the architecture in 3GPP compliant mobile networks
- Afghan National Security Forces, or Afghan National Defense and Security Forces
