= IEEE 802.21 =

IEEE standard

The IEEE 802.21 standard for Media Independent Handoff (MIH) is an IEEE standard published in 2008. The standard supports algorithms enabling seamless handover between wired and wireless networks of the same type as well as handover between different wired and wireless network types also called media independent handover (MIH) or vertical handover. The vertical handover was first introduced by Mark Stemn and Randy Katz at U C Berkeley. The standard provides information to allow handing over to and from wired 802.3 networks to wireless 802.11, 802.15, 802.16, 3GPP and 3GPP2 networks through different handover mechanisms.

The IEEE 802.21 working group started work in March 2004. More than 30 companies have joined the working group. The group produced a first draft of the standard including the protocol definition in May 2005. The standard was published in January 2009.

== Reasons for 802.21 ==
Cellular networks and 802.11 networks employ handover mechanisms for handover within the same network type (aka horizontal handover). Mobile IP provides handover mechanisms for handover across subnets of different types of networks, but can be slow in the process. Current 802 standards do not support handover between different types of networks. They also do not provide triggers or other services to accelerate mobile IP-based handovers. Moreover, existing 802 standards provide mechanisms for detecting and selecting network access points, but do not allow for detection and selection of network access points in a way that is independent of the network type.

== Some of the expectations ==
- Allow roaming between 802.11 networks and 3G cellular networks.
- Allow users to engage in ad hoc teleconferencing.
- Apply to both wired and wireless networks, likely the same list as IEEE P1905 specifies to cooperate in software-defined networking (see also OpenFlow)
- Allow for use by multiple vendors and users.
  - Compatibility and conformance with other IEEE 802 standards especially 802.11u unknown user authentication and 802.11s ad hoc wireless mesh networking.
- Include definitions for managed objects that are compatible with management standards like SNMP.
- Although security algorithms and security protocols will not be defined in the standard, authentication, authorization, and network detection and selection will be supported by the protocol.

== Implementation and Issues ==
Implementation is still in progress. Current technologies such as 802.11 that accomplish handover use software to accomplish handovers and suggest that software will also be the way that handover will be implemented by 802.21. The use of software as a means to implement 802.21 should not cause large increases in the cost of networking devices. An open-source software implementation is provided by ODTONE.

Crossing different administrative connectivity domains will require agreements among different network operators. Currently, such agreements are still not in place. In smartphones today, a user can manually select to use WiFi or cellular LTE, but the connections are not automatically maintained should a disconnection of one network occurs.

Hence, seamless handovers across different wire/wireless networks are still not available today.

=== Examples ===
- A user should be able to unplug from an 802.3 network and get handed off to an 802.11 network.
- A cellular phone user during a call should be able to enter an 802.11 network hotspot and be seamlessly handed off from a GSM network to the 802.11 networks and back again when leaving the hotspot.

== Other similar technologies ==
Unlicensed Mobile Access (UMA) technology is a mobile-centric version of 802.21. UMA is said to provide roaming and handover between GSM, UMTS, Bluetooth and 802.11 networks. Since June 19, 2005, UMA is a part of the ETSI 3GPP standardization process under the GAN (Generic Access Network) Group.

The Evolved Packet Core (EPC) architecture for Next Generation Mobile Networks (3GPP Rel.8 and newer) provides the Access Network Discovery and Selection Function element (ANDSF) (see 3GPP TS 23.402 and 3GPP TS 24.312). Its S14 interface provides the communication path between the Core Network and the User Endpoint device on which to exchange discovery information and inter-system mobility policies, enabling as such a network-suggested reselection of access networks.

== See also ==
- Mobility management
- Mobile IP
- Handover
- Radio resource management
- Roaming
- Vertical handoff
- Handoffs in Wireless ATM / Mobile ATM Asynchronous Transfer Mode#Wireless ATM or mobile ATM
