= John Day (computer scientist) =

American computer scientist

John D. Day (from Kinmundy, Illinois, born 1947) is an electrical engineer, an Internet pioneer, and a historian. He has been involved in the development of the communication protocols of Internet and its predecessor ARPANET since the 1970s, and he was also active in the design of the OSI reference model. He has contributed in the research and development of network management systems, distributed databases, supercomputing, and operating systems.

Day received his BSc degree in electrical engineering in 1970 and MSc degree in 1976 from the University of Illinois. From 1969 through 1978 he worked on the Illiac IV supercomputer project.

Day was adjunct professor at Worcester Polytechnic Institute in 2006 and is currently a lecturer in Computer Science at Boston University Metropolitan College.

Day is the author of the 2008 book Patterns in Network Architecture: A Return to Fundamentals, which gave rise to Network IPC, later referred to as the Recursive InterNetwork Architecture (RINA), and the RFC documents RFC 520, RFC 728, RFC 731, and RFC 732. He has also published articles on the history of cartography, on topics such as Matteo Ricci's 16th–17th century maps.
