= Proxy Mobile IPv6 =

Mobility management protocol

Proxy Mobile IPv6 (or PMIPv6, or PMIP) is a network-based mobility management protocol standardized by IETF and is specified in RFC 5213. It is a protocol for building a common and access technology independent of mobile core networks, accommodating various access technologies such as WiMAX, 3GPP, 3GPP2 and WLAN based access architectures. Proxy Mobile IPv6 is the only network-based mobility management protocol standardized by IETF.

== See also ==
- Mobile IP
- Host Identity Protocol (HIP)
- Identifier-Locator Network Protocol (ILNP)
