= Site Multihoming by IPv6 Intermediation =

The Site Multihoming by IPv6 Intermediation (SHIM6) protocol is an Internet Layer defined in RFC 5533.

== Architecture ==
The SHIM6 architecture defines failure detection and locator pair exploration functions. The first is used to detect outages through the path defined by the current locator pair for a communication. To achieve this, hints provided by upper protocols such as Transmission Control Protocol (TCP) are used, or specific SHIM6 packet probes. The second function is used to determine valid locator pairs that could be used when an outage is detected.

The ability to change locators while a communication is being held introduces security problems, so mechanisms based on applying cryptography to the address generation process (Cryptographically Generated Addresses, CGA), or on bounding the addresses to the prefixes assigned to a host through hash-based addresses were defined. These approaches are not needed for IPv4 because of the short address length (32 bits).

An implementation of shim6 in the Linux kernel is available under the name LinShim6.

== See also ==
- Locator/Identifier Separation Protocol
