= Identifier-Locator Network Protocol =

The Identifier-Locator Network Protocol (ILNP) is a network protocol that divides the two functions of network addresses, namely the identification of network endpoints, and assisting routing, by separating topological information from node identity. ILNP is backwards-compatible with existing Internet Protocol functions, and is incrementally deployable.

ILNP has an architecture with two different instantiations. ILNPv4 is ILNP engineered to work as a set of IPv4 extensions, while ILNPv6 has a set of IPv6 extensions.

At least three independent open-source implementations of ILNPv6 exist. University of St Andrews (Scotland) has a prototype in Linux/x86 and FreeBSD/x86, while Tsinghua U. (China) has a prototype in Linux/x86. The University of St Andrews ILNP group is led by Prof. Saleem Bhatti. Other academics involved in continuing research include Ryo Yanagida, Samuel J. Ivey and Gregor Haywood.

In February 2011, the IRTF Routing Research Group (RRG) Chairs recommended that the IETF standardise ILNP (RFC 6115) as the preferred evolutionary direction for IPv6.

== RFC specifications ==
- RFC 6740 – ILNP Architectural Description
- RFC 6741 – ILNP Engineering Considerations
- RFC 6742 – DNS Resource Records for ILNP
- RFC 6743 – ICMPv6 Locator Update Message for ILNPv6
- RFC 6744 – IPv6 Nonce Destination Option for ILNPv6
- RFC 6745 – ICMP Locator Update for IPv4
- RFC 6746 – IPv4 Options for ILNPv4
- RFC 6747 – Address Resolution Protocol (ARP) for ILNPv4
- RFC 6748 – Optional Advanced Deployment Scenarios for ILNP

== See also ==
- Host Identity Protocol
- Locator/Identifier Separation Protocol
- Mobile IP
- Proxy Mobile IPv6
