= Care-of address =

Temporary IP address for mobile device

A care-of address (usually referred to as CoA) is a temporary IP address for a mobile device used in Internet routing. This allows a home agent to forward messages to the mobile device. A separate address is required because the IP address of the device that is used as host identification is topologically incorrect—it does not match the network of attachment. The care-of address splits the dual nature of an IP address, that is, its use is to identify the host and the location within the global IP network.

== Address assignment ==
The care-of address can be acquired by the mobile node in two different ways:

- Foreign agent care-of address (FACoA): The mobile node receives the same CoA as the foreign agent. All mobile nodes in the foreign network are given the same CoA.
- Co-located care-of address: Each mobile node in the foreign network is assigned its own CoA, usually by a DHCP server. This might happen in a network where the foreign agent has not been deployed yet.

Given the imminent IPv4 address exhaustion, the first solution is more frequently chosen, because it does not waste a public IP address for every mobile node when changing network location, as the collocated CoA does.

The care-of address has to be a valid IP address within the foreign network, so that it allows the mobile node to receive and make connections with any host in the outside. To send outgoing packets, the mobile node may as well use its home address but, since it is not a connected IP address for the current network attachment, some routers in the way might prevent the packets from reaching the destination.

That is why, in IPv4, the outgoing information is transported to the home agent (which is in the home network) by means of an IP tunnel. From the Home Network, the packets of the Mobile Node can be sent using its original Home Address, without any routing problem. The Correspondent Node will send its information again to the Home Network. Thus, it has to be sent on through the tunnel to the foreign agent and then to the Mobile Node.

When all mobile nodes share the same IP address with the foreign agent, this is implemented by the foreign agent acting as a proxy ARP.

== See also ==
- Mobile IP
