= Access network discovery and selection function =

Mobile network discovery and selection function

Access network discovery and selection function (ANDSF) is an entity within an evolved packet core (EPC) of the system architecture evolution (SAE) for 3GPP compliant mobile networks. The purpose of the ANDSF is to assist user equipment (UE) to discover non-3GPP access networks – such as Wi-Fi or WIMAX – that can be used for data communications in addition to 3GPP access networks (such as HSPA or LTE) and to provide the UE with rules policing the connection to these networks.

== Information provided ==
An ANDSF can provide the following information to a UE, based on operator configuration:

- Inter-system mobility policy (ISMP)– network selections rules for a UE with no more than one active access network connection (e.g., either LTE or Wi-Fi)
- Inter-system routing policy (ISRP) – network selection rules for a UE with potentially more than one active access network connection (e.g., both LTE and Wi-Fi). Such UE may employ IP flow mobility (IFOM), multiple-access PDN connectivity (MAPCON) or non-seamless Wi-Fi offload according to operator policy and user preferences.
- Discovery information – a list of networks that may be available in the vicinity of the UE and information assisting the UE to expedite the connection to these networks

The ANDSF communicates with the UE over the S14 reference point, which is essentially a synchronization of an OMA-DM management object (MO) specific to ANDSF.

== History ==
The term ANDSF was first conceived by the 3GPP in Release 8 as part of the effort to standardise the behavior of the ever-growing abundance of 3GPP-compliant UEs (e.g. smartphones) that can also access non-3GPP data networks.

== Known implementations ==
- Smart Access Manager (SAM) by InterDigital is an Intelligent network connectivity and data traffic management application for Android and iOS devices ensuring improved end-user experience with seamless connection and authentication, while creating new revenue generating opportunities for network operators. Compliant to 3GPP ANDSF Release 8 to Release 11, also supports connectivity to legacy and Hotspot 2.0 networks, and has been successfully completed interoperability with multiple Tier 1 infrastructure vendors ensuring economies of scale and a future proof solution.
- Carnegie SmartSwitch is an ANDSF compliant application for Android and iOS. Using policy on the device concepts, SmartSwitch provides operators with a solution for Wi-Fi offload management, contextual marketing, network protection and contextual analytics. It is integrated with network policy equipment supporting the ANDSF functionality.
- Nextwave Simplify implements ANDSF features on Android and iOS platforms. The software comes available in application and a SDK for Android device OEMs to integrate ANDSF features. Simplify is extending its commercial support for 3GPP Rel. 10 specifically on Inter System Routing Policy (ISRP) in later 2013.
- Smith Micro’s NetWise I/O toolkit for ANDSF uses a service agent on an Android device to test the S14 interface specified in the ANDSF standard, and includes documentation and test scripts to validate execution of commands against ANDSF management objects.
- Openet and Smith Micro completed interoperability tests leveraging standards-based methods to deliver intelligent Wi-Fi offload and traffic optimization for heterogeneous networks in September 2013. This implementation used Smith Micro’s NetWise I/O Toolkit and centered on Openet’s Access Network Discovery and Selection Function (ANDSF) server.
- Birdstep SmartANDSF is an enhancement of the standard 3GPP ANDSF and Hotspot 2.0 and proprietary smart WiFi-triggers.
- WeANDSF – a commercial system developed by WeFi inc., employing data intelligence to discover and select the access network that is predicted to perform best for the specific UE time and location, without interaction with an ANDSF.
- OpenEPC - a test-bed prototype implementation of all 3GPP Rel. 11/12 functional elements. The ANDSF supports the full Rel.12 Management Object with ISMP, ISRP, IARP, WLANSP (HotSpot 2.0), etc. Client platform options are offered for Linux and Android.
- Multiple UE vendors are currently engaged in implementing the ANDSF MO as part of their Mobile Device Management frameworks, with releases expected during 2012 and onwards.
- ANDSF plugin for Notava uAxes Managed WiFi Offloading system enables ANDSF MO based policy enforcement for non-ANDSF capable devices including iOS devices, Android devices without EAP-SIM and PCs with 3G dongles.
- 5780_DSC is commercial Policy Control module which offers the network based ANDSF function, as part of the Payment Policy and Charging solution by Alcatel-Lucent
