= Shirley Boys' High School =

- Māori: Ngā Tama o Ōruapaeroa

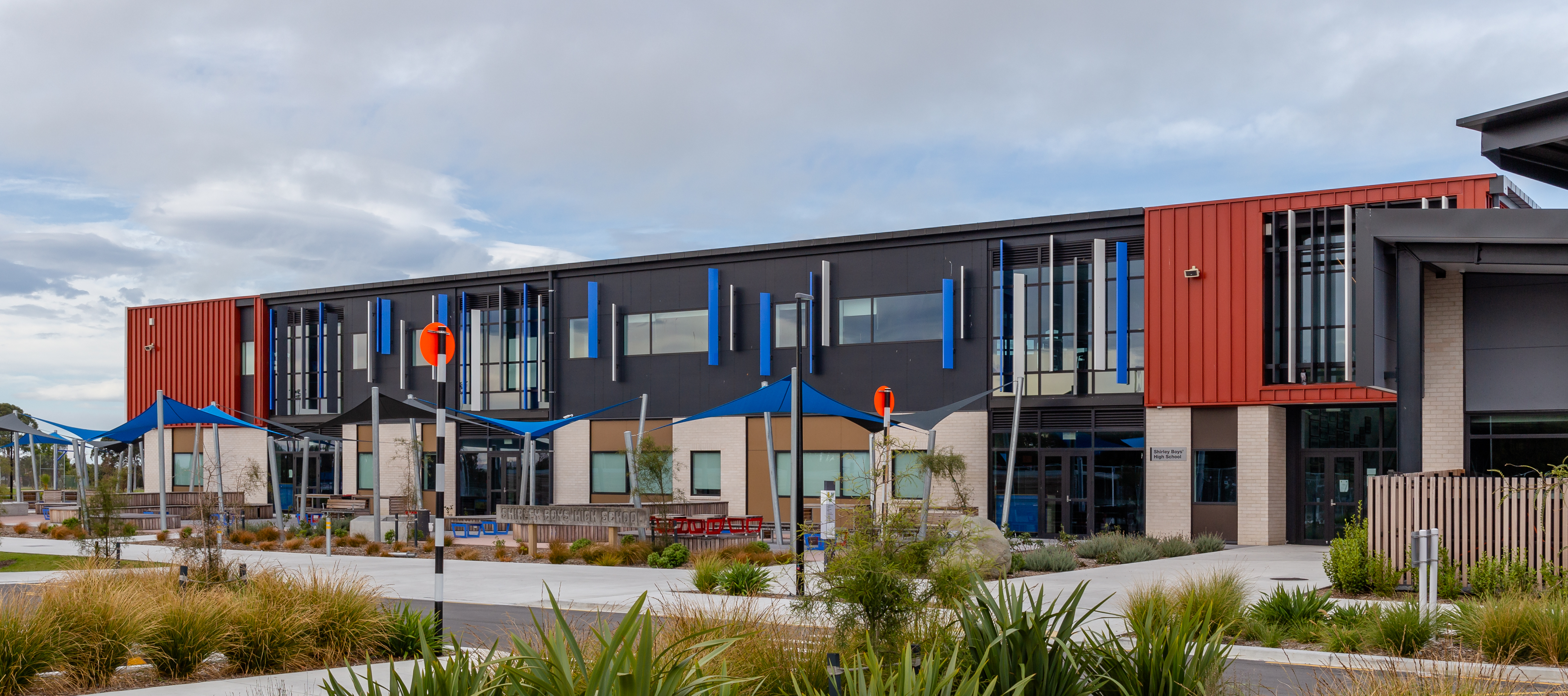

Location
- 209 Travis Road; Christchurch; New Zealand

Information
- Type: State single sex boys secondary
- Motto: Latin: Interest Omnium Recte Facere (In everyone’s interests to act rightly)
- Established: 1957
- Ministry of Education Institution no.: 321
- Chairman: Iaean Cranwell
- Headmaster: Tim Grocott
- Grades: 9–13
- Enrolment: 1,315 (July 2026)
- Colors: Blue and Gold
- Socio-economic decile: 6N
- Website: shirley.school.nz

Shirley Boys' High School (Māori: Ngā Tama o Ōruapaeroa), also known as SBHS, is a single-sex state (public) secondary school in Christchurch, New Zealand. It was originally situated on a six-hectare (15-acre) site in the suburb of Shirley, but in April 2019 moved, along with Avonside Girls' High School, further east to the former QEII Park, 8.6 kilometres (5.3 mi) from the city centre.

== Brief history ==
Parents in the eastern and northern suburbs of Christchurch had wanted single-sex education for their sons. In 1957, this finally became available when the school opened under its first Headmaster, Charles Gallagher.

Established on a swampy paddock formerly used for grazing horses to the west of North Parade, the School grew. Within a few years it became a rival to Christchurch Boys' High School as well as to St. Andrew's and St Bede's College.

A detailed satirical portrait of the school as it was in the late 1960s can be found in The Shining City, a novel by former student Stevan Eldred-Grigg.

On the Easter weekend (April) of 2007, Shirley Boys' High School celebrated its 50th Jubilee. Commemorative events included an Old Boys' XV playing the current 2nd XV and the 1st XV playing in historic uniform against St. Andrew's College; as well as a golf tournament, formal black-tie dinner, staff luncheon and 'meet-and-greet evening'.

=== 2011 earthquake ===
During the magnitude 6.3 quake on 22 February the school suffered extensive damage and had to close. At least two classroom blocks were expected to be demolished, and all of the concrete areas of the school, including the new tennis courts, were badly damaged.

The students did not attend school for almost a month afterwards, before the decision was made to shift its pupils to Papanui High School – with Papanui High School's students changing to attend classes from 8 am until 1 pm, while the Shirley Boys' High School students entered the school at 1.15 pm and finished at 5.45 pm. After about 6 months of this arrangement pupils were able to return to the re-opened school in early September 2011.

=== Move to new site ===
Education Minister Hekia Parata announced on 16 October 2013 that the school would move, and be co-located with Avonside Girls' High School at a site in east Christchurch. On 12 February 2015 the site was announced to be the former QEII Park site.

The move to the new site was completed in April 2019.

== Enrolment ==
As of July 2026, Shirley Boys' High School has roll of 1,315 students, of which 315 (24.0%) identify as Māori.

As of 2026, the school has an Equity Index of 464, placing it amongst schools whose students have average socioeconomic barriers to achievement (roughly equivalent to deciles 5 and 6 under the former socio-economic decile system).

== Houses ==
Shirley Boys' High School Houses
Aoraki	Named after Aoraki / Mount Cook, the largest peak in New Zealand.
Mullins	Named after Mr. Mullins, Former Deputy Headmaster.
Snell	Named after Peter Snell, New Zealand athlete.
Blake	Named after Peter Blake, New Zealand sailor and conservationist.

== Headmasters ==
Since its foundation in 1957, Shirley Boys' High School has had five headmasters. The following is a complete list:

	Name	Term
1	Charles Gallagher	1957–1969
2	Murray Denholm	1970–1986
3	Denis Cocks	1987–1996
4	John Laurenson	1996–2019
5	Tim Grocott	2020–present

== Sport ==
=== Cricket ===
In February 2025, during the Christchurch qualifying tournament for the NZC 1st XI Cup (formerly the Gillette Cup), the school's 1st XI scored 321 without loss in a Twenty20 match against Hillmorton High School at Hagley Park, Christchurch. Openers Douglas Bongartz (189 not out from 58 balls, including 17 sixes) and Josh McIlraith (105 not out from 60 balls, with no sixes) shared an unbroken opening partnership of 321. Hillmorton made 109 in reply.

== Notable alumni ==
- Nathan Astle, former New Zealand cricketer
- Tahlor Cahill, current Canterbury, Crusaders and Maori All Blacks rugby player
- Tom Christie, former Crusader and current Newcastle Red Bulls rugby player
- Ryan Crotty, former Crusaders and All Blacks rugby player
- Stevan Eldred-Grigg, New Zealand novelist and historian
- Aaron Gilmore, former Member of Parliament
- Craig Green, former All Blacks rugby Player
- Jamayne Isaako, current Dolphins rugby league player
- Chris Jack, former All Blacks rugby player
- Dave Jaggar, computer scientist and James Clerk Maxwell Medal winner
- Brodie McAlister, current Chiefs and All Blacks XV rugby player
- Hugh McCutcheon, former assistant athletic director/sport development coach for the University of Minnesota
- Craig McMillan, former New Zealand cricketer
- Eden Mulholland, composer and dancer
- Richard Petrie, former New Zealand cricketer
- Setaimata Sa, former rugby league player
- Steve Scott, former Canterbury and All Blacks rugby player
- Bradley Shaw, former Black Sticks hockey player
- Hayden Shaw, former Black Sticks hockey player
- Makaia Tafua, current New Zealand Warriors rugby league player
- Duncan Webb, lawyer and politician
