= GSM =

Cellular telephone network standard since 1991

The GSM logo is used to identify compatible devices and equipment. The dots symbolize three clients in the home network and one roaming client.

The Global System for Mobile Communications (GSM) is a family of standards to describe the protocols for second-generation (2G) digital cellular networks, as used by mobile devices such as mobile phones and mobile broadband modems. GSM is also a trademark owned by the GSM Association. "GSM" may also refer to the voice codec initially used in GSM.

2G networks were developed as a replacement for first generation (1G) analog cellular networks. The original GSM standard, which was developed by the European Telecommunications Standards Institute (ETSI), originally described a digital, circuit-switched network optimized for full duplex voice telephony, employing time division multiple access (TDMA) between stations. This expanded over time to include data communications, first by circuit-switched transport, then by packet data transport via its upgraded standards, GPRS and then EDGE. GSM exists in various versions based on the frequency bands used.

GSM was first implemented in Finland in December 1991. It became the global standard for mobile cellular communications, with over 2 billion GSM subscribers globally in 2006, far above its competing standard, CDMA. Its share reached over 90% market share by the mid-2010s, and operating in over 219 countries and territories. The specifications and maintenance of GSM passed over to the 3GPP body in 2000, which at the time developed third-generation (3G) UMTS standards, followed by the fourth-generation (4G) LTE Advanced and the fifth-generation 5G standards, which do not form part of the GSM standard. Beginning in the late 2010s, various carriers worldwide started to shut down their GSM networks; nevertheless, as a result of the network's widespread use, the acronym "GSM" is still used as a generic term for the plethora of G mobile phone technologies evolved from it or mobile phones itself.

== History ==
=== Initial European development ===
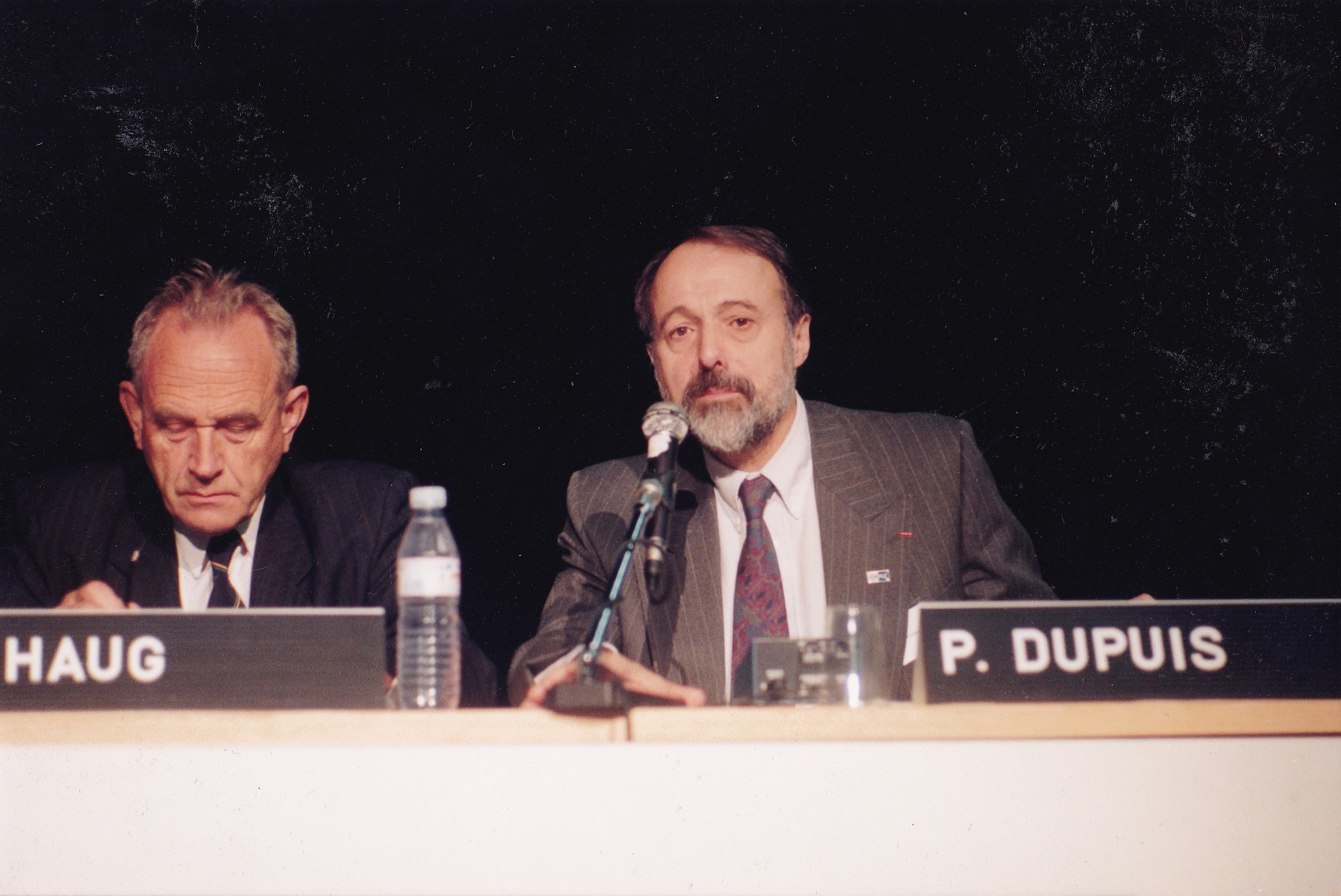
Thomas Haug (first GSM president) and Philippe Dupuis (second GSM president) during a GSM meeting in Belgium, April 1992

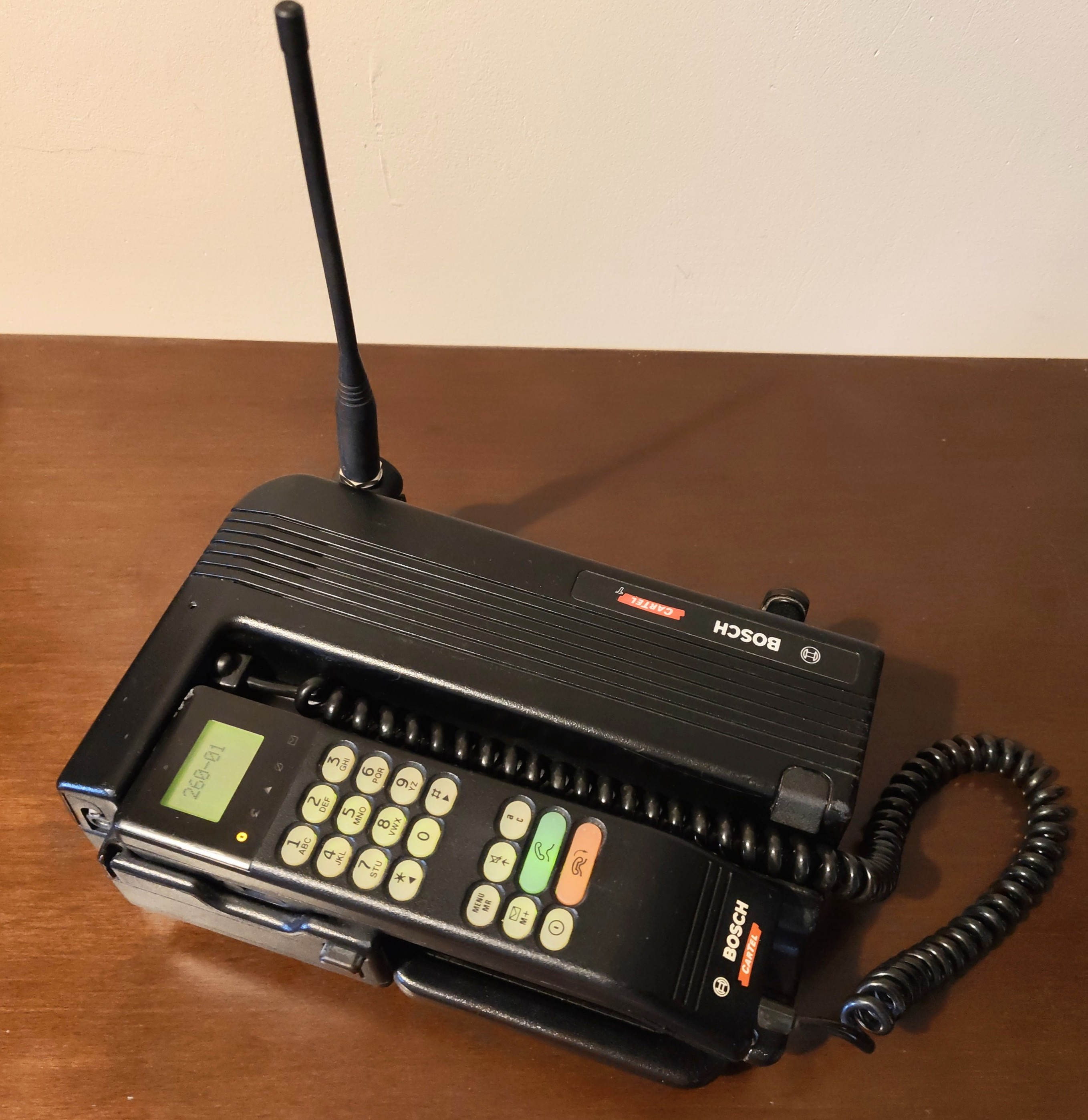
Bosch CarTel T, an early GSM 900 cellular telephone. It is a rebranded variant of the Motorola International 1000.

In 1983, work began to develop a European standard for digital cellular voice telecommunications when the European Conference of Postal and Telecommunications Administrations (CEPT) set up the Groupe Spécial Mobile (GSM) committee and later provided a permanent technical-support group based in Paris. Five years later, in 1987, 15 representatives from 13 European countries signed a memorandum of understanding in Copenhagen to develop and deploy a common cellular telephone system across Europe, and EU rules were passed to make GSM a mandatory standard. The decision to develop a continental standard eventually resulted in a unified, open, standard-based network which was larger than that in the United States.

In February 1987 Europe produced the first agreed GSM Technical Specification. Ministers from the EU Big Four (France, West Germany, United Kingdom and Italy) cemented their political support for GSM with the Bonn Declaration on Global Information Networks in May and the GSM MoU was tabled for signature in September. The MoU drew in mobile operators from across Europe to pledge to invest in new GSM networks to an ambitious common date.

In this short 38-week period the whole of Europe (countries and industries) had been brought behind GSM, as guided by four public officials: Armin Silberhorn (Germany), Stephen Temple (UK), Philippe Dupuis (France), and Renzo Failli (Italy). In 1989 the Groupe Spécial Mobile committee was transferred from CEPT to the European Telecommunications Standards Institute (ETSI). The IEEE/RSE awarded to Thomas Haug and Philippe Dupuis the 2018 James Clerk Maxwell medal for their "leadership in the development of the first international mobile communications standard with subsequent evolution into worldwide smartphone data communication". The GSM (2G) has evolved into 3G, 4G and 5G.

=== First networks ===
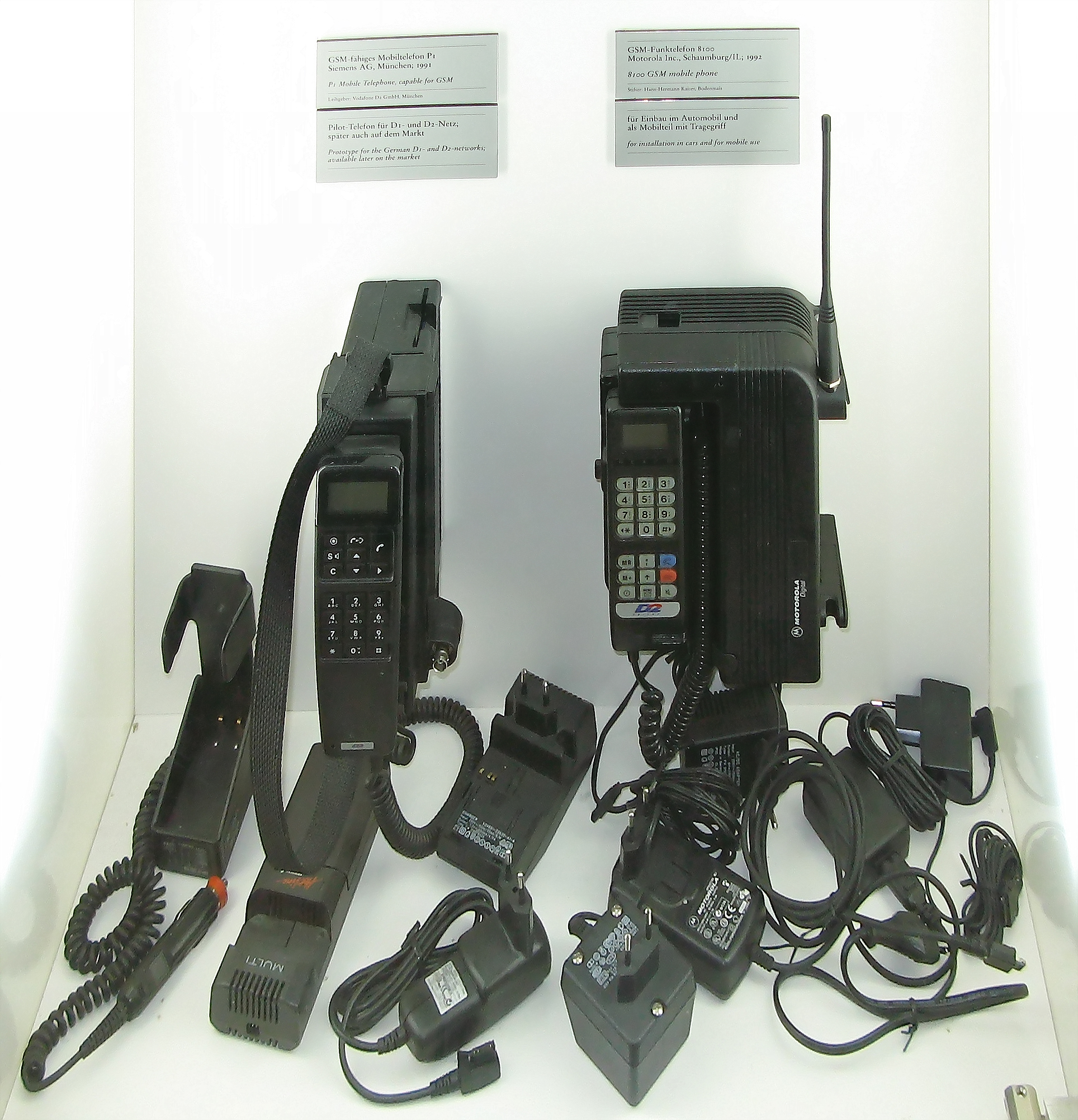
Prototype GSM phones

In parallel France and Germany signed a joint development agreement in 1984 and were joined by Italy and the UK in 1986. In 1986, the European Commission proposed reserving the 900 MHz spectrum band for GSM. It was long believed that the former Finnish prime minister Harri Holkeri made the world's first GSM call on 1 July 1991, calling Kaarina Suonio (deputy mayor of the city of Tampere) using a network built by Nokia and Siemens and operated by Radiolinja. In 2021 a former Nokia engineer Pekka Lonka revealed to Helsingin Sanomat making a test call just a couple of hours earlier. "World's first GSM call was actually made by me. I called Marjo Jousinen, in Salo.", Lonka informed. The following year saw the sending of the first short messaging service (SMS or "text message") message, and Vodafone UK and Telecom Finland signed the first international roaming agreement.

=== Enhancements ===
Work began in 1991 to expand the GSM standard to the 1800 MHz frequency band and the first 1800 MHz network (Mercury One2One) became operational in the UK by 1993, called the DCS 1800. Also that year, Telstra became the first network operator to deploy a GSM network outside Europe and the first practical hand-held GSM mobile phone became available.

In 1995 fax, data and SMS messaging services were launched commercially, the first 1900 MHz GSM network became operational in the United States and GSM subscribers worldwide exceeded 10 million. In the same year, the GSM Association formed. Pre-paid GSM SIM cards were launched in 1996 and worldwide GSM subscribers passed 100 million in 1998.

In 2000 the first commercial General Packet Radio Service (GPRS) services were launched and the first GPRS-compatible handsets became available for sale. In 2001, the first UMTS (W-CDMA) network was launched, a 3G technology that is not part of GSM. Worldwide GSM subscribers exceeded 500 million. In 2002, the first Multimedia Messaging Service (MMS) was introduced and the first GSM network in the 800 MHz frequency band became operational. Enhanced Data rates for GSM Evolution (EDGE) services first became operational in a network in 2003, and the number of worldwide GSM subscribers exceeded 1 billion in 2004.

By 2005 GSM networks accounted for more than 75% of the worldwide cellular network market, serving 1.5 billion subscribers. In 2005, the first network capable to utilize High Speed Downlink Packet Access (HSDPA) also became operational. The complementary High Speed Uplink Packet Access (HSUPA) technology's first network was launched in 2007. The amalgamation of HSDPA and HSUPA is known as High Speed Packet Access (HSPA). Even though HSPA, with its uplink and downlink versions, is 3G technology and not GSM, in 2008, worldwide GSM subscribers exceeded three billion.

=== Adoption ===
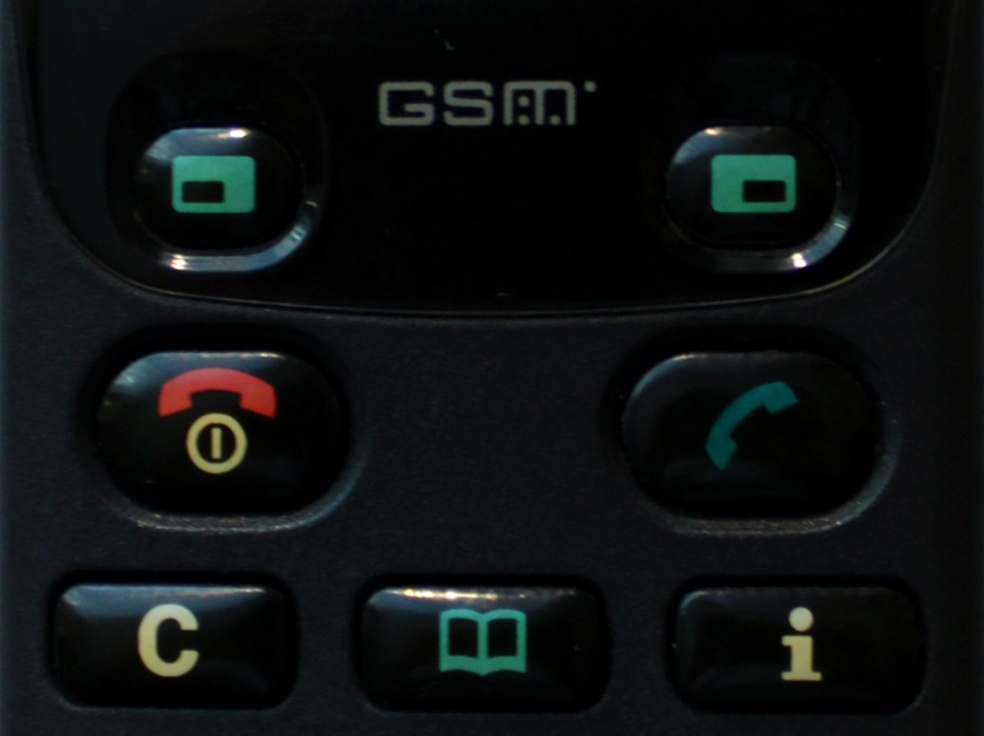
GSM logo icon shown on the face of a Siemens GSM mobile phone from 1996

The GSM Association estimated in 2011 that technologies defined in the GSM standard served 80% of the mobile market, encompassing more than 5 billion people across more than 212 countries and territories, making GSM the most ubiquitous of the many standards for cellular networks.

GSM is a second-generation (2G) standard employing time-division multiple-access (TDMA) spectrum-sharing, issued by the European Telecommunications Standards Institute (ETSI). The GSM standard does not include the 3G Universal Mobile Telecommunications System (UMTS), code-division multiple access (CDMA) technology, nor the 4G LTE orthogonal frequency-division multiple access (OFDMA) technology standards issued by the 3GPP.

GSM, for the first time, set a common standard for Europe for wireless networks. It was also adopted by many countries outside Europe. This allowed subscribers to use other GSM networks that have roaming agreements with each other. The common standard reduced research and development costs, since hardware and software could be sold with only minor adaptations for the local market.

=== Discontinuation ===
Telstra in Australia shut down its 2G GSM network on 1 December 2016, the first mobile network operator to decommission a GSM network. The second mobile provider to shut down its GSM network (on 1 January 2017) was AT&T Mobility from the United States. Optus in Australia completed the shut down of its 2G GSM network on 1 August 2017, part of the Optus GSM network covering Western Australia and the Northern Territory had earlier in the year been shut down in April 2017. Singapore shut down 2G services entirely in April 2017.

== Technical details ==
The structure of a GSM network

=== Network structure ===
The network is structured into several discrete sections:

- Base station subsystem – the base stations and their controllers
- Network and Switching Subsystem – the part of the network most similar to a fixed network, sometimes just called the "core network"
- GPRS Core Network – the optional part which allows packet-based Internet connections
- Operations support system (OSS) – network maintenance

=== Base-station subsystem ===
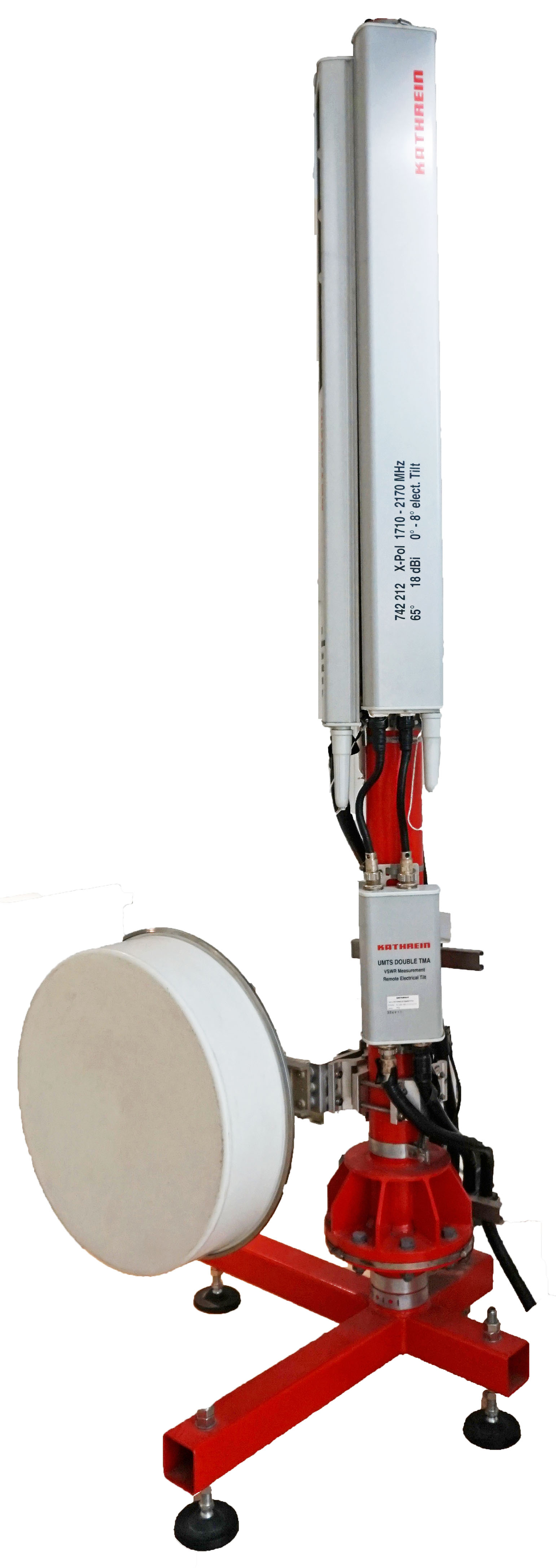
GSM cell site antennas in the Deutsches Museum, Munich, Germany

GSM utilizes a cellular network, meaning that cell phones connect to it by searching for cells in the immediate vicinity. There are five different cell sizes in a GSM network:

- Macrocell
- Microcell
- Picocell
- Femtocell
- Umbrella cell

The coverage area of each cell varies according to the implementation environment. Macro cells can be regarded as cells where the base-station antenna is installed on a mast or a building above average rooftop level. Micro cells are cells whose antenna height is under average rooftop level; they are typically deployed in urban areas. Picocells are small cells whose coverage diameter is a few dozen meters; they are mainly used indoors. Femtocells are cells designed for use in residential or small-business environments and connect to a telecommunications service provider's network via a broadband-internet connection. Umbrella cells are used to cover shadowed regions of smaller cells and to fill in gaps in coverage between those cells.

Cell horizontal radius varies – depending on antenna height, antenna gain, and propagation conditions – from a couple of hundred meters to several tens of kilometers. The longest distance the GSM specification supports in practical use is 35 kilometres (22 mi). There are also several implementations of the concept of an extended cell, where the cell radius could be double or even more, depending on the antenna system, the type of terrain, and the timing advance.

GSM supports indoor coverage – achievable by using an indoor picocell base station, or an indoor repeater with distributed indoor antennas fed through power splitters – to deliver the radio signals from an antenna outdoors to the separate indoor distributed antenna system. Picocells are typically deployed when significant call capacity is needed indoors, as in shopping centers or airports. However, this is not a prerequisite, since indoor coverage is also provided by in-building penetration of radio signals from any nearby cell.

==== GSM carrier frequencies ====
GSM networks operate in a number of different carrier frequency ranges (separated into GSM frequency ranges for 2G and UMTS frequency bands for 3G), with most 2G GSM networks operating in the 900 MHz or 1800 MHz bands. Where these bands were already allocated, the 850 MHz and 1900 MHz bands were used instead (for example in Canada and the United States). In rare cases the 400 and 450 MHz frequency bands are assigned in some countries because they were previously used for first-generation systems.

For comparison, most 3G networks in Europe operate in the 2100 MHz frequency band. For more information on worldwide GSM frequency usage, see GSM frequency bands.

Regardless of the frequency selected by an operator, it is divided into timeslots for individual phones. This allows eight full-rate or sixteen half-rate speech channels per radio frequency. These eight radio timeslots (or burst periods) are grouped into a TDMA frame. Half-rate channels use alternate frames in the same timeslot. The channel data rate for all 8 channels is 270.833 kbit/s, and the frame duration is 4.615 ms. TDMA noise is interference that can be heard on speakers near a GSM phone using TDMA, audible as a buzzing sound.

The transmission power in the handset is limited to a maximum of 2 watts in GSM 850/900 and 1 watt in GSM 1800/1900.

==== Voice codecs ====
GSM has used a variety of voice codecs to squeeze 3.1 kHz audio into between 7 and 13 kbit/s. Originally, two codecs, named after the types of data channel they were allocated, were used, called Half Rate (6.5 kbit/s) and Full Rate (13 kbit/s). These used a system based on linear predictive coding (LPC). In addition to being efficient with bitrates, these codecs also made it easier to identify more important parts of the audio, allowing the air interface layer to prioritize and better protect these parts of the signal. GSM was further enhanced in 1997 with the enhanced full rate (EFR) codec, a 12.2 kbit/s codec that uses a full-rate channel. Finally, with the development of UMTS, EFR was refactored into a variable-rate codec called AMR-Narrowband, which is high quality and robust against interference when used on full-rate channels, or less robust but still relatively high quality when used in good radio conditions on half-rate channel.

=== Subscriber Identity Module (SIM) ===
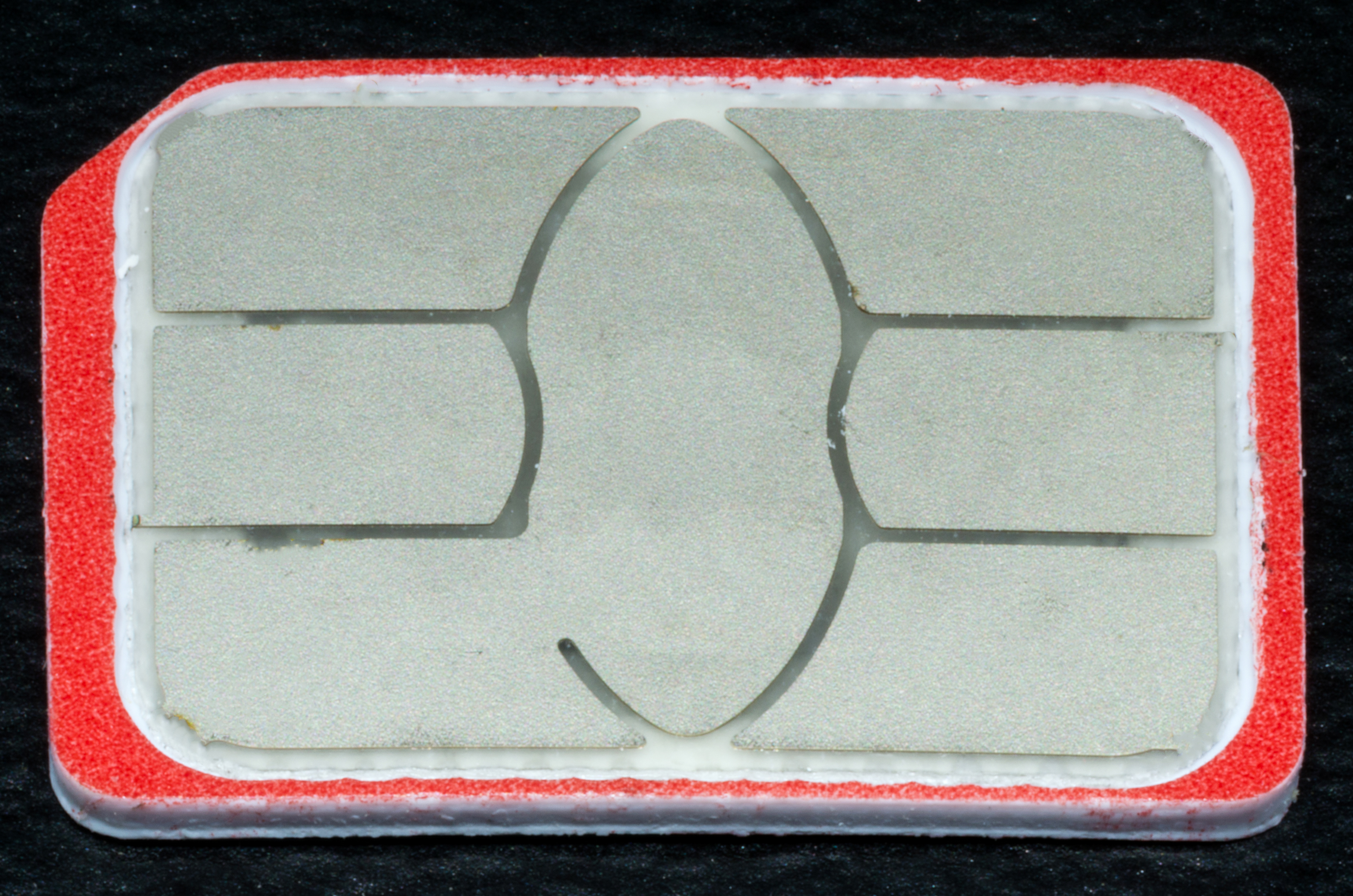
A nano sim used in mobile phones

One of the key features of GSM is the Subscriber Identity Module, commonly known as a SIM card. The SIM is a detachable smart card containing a user's subscription information and phone book. This allows users to retain their information after switching handsets. Alternatively, users can change networks or network identities without switching handsets - simply by changing the SIM.

=== Phone locking ===
Sometimes mobile network operators restrict handsets that they sell for exclusive use in their own network. This is called SIM locking and is implemented by a software feature of the phone. A subscriber may usually contact the provider to remove the lock for a fee, utilize private services to remove the lock, or use software and websites to unlock the handset themselves. It is possible to hack past a phone locked by a network operator.

In some countries and regions (e.g. Brazil and Germany) all phones are sold unlocked due to the abundance of dual-SIM handsets and operators.

== GSM security ==
GSM was intended to be a secure wireless system. It has considered the user authentication using a pre-shared key and challenge–response, and over-the-air encryption. However, GSM is vulnerable to different types of attack, each of them aimed at a different part of the network.

Research findings indicate that GSM faces susceptibility to hacking by script kiddies, a term referring to inexperienced individuals utilizing readily available hardware and software. The vulnerability arises from the accessibility of tools such as a DVB-T TV tuner, posing a threat to both mobile and network users. Despite the term "script kiddies" implying a lack of sophisticated skills, the consequences of their attacks on GSM can be severe, impacting the functionality of cellular networks. Given that GSM continues to be the main source of cellular technology in numerous countries, its susceptibility to potential threats from malicious attacks is one that needs to be addressed.

The development of UMTS introduced an optional Universal Subscriber Identity Module (USIM) that uses a longer authentication key to give greater security, as well as mutually authenticating the network and the user, whereas GSM only authenticates the user to the network (and not vice versa). The security model therefore offers confidentiality and authentication, but limited authorization capabilities, and no non-repudiation.

GSM uses several cryptographic algorithms for security. The A5/1, A5/2, and A5/3 stream ciphers are used for ensuring over-the-air voice privacy. A5/1 was developed first and is a stronger algorithm used within Europe and the United States; A5/2 is weaker and used in other countries. Serious weaknesses have been found in both algorithms: it is possible to break A5/2 in real-time with a ciphertext-only attack, and in January 2007, The Hacker's Choice started the A5/1 cracking project with plans to use FPGAs that allow A5/1 to be broken with a rainbow table attack. The system supports multiple algorithms so operators may replace that cipher with a stronger one.

Since 2000, different efforts have been made in order to crack the A5 encryption algorithms. Both A5/1 and A5/2 algorithms have been broken, and their cryptanalysis has been revealed in the literature. As an example, Karsten Nohl developed a number of rainbow tables (static values which reduce the time needed to carry out an attack) and have found new sources for known plaintext attacks. He said that it is possible to build "a full GSM interceptor ... from open-source components" but that they had not done so because of legal concerns. Nohl claimed that he was able to intercept voice and text conversations by impersonating another user to listen to voicemail, make calls, or send text messages using a seven-year-old Motorola cellphone and decryption software available for free online.

GSM uses General Packet Radio Service (GPRS) for data transmissions like browsing the web. The most commonly deployed GPRS ciphers were publicly broken in 2011.

The researchers revealed flaws in the commonly used GEA/1 and GEA/2 (standing for GPRS Encryption Algorithms 1 and 2) ciphers and published the open-source "gprsdecode" software for sniffing GPRS networks. They also noted that some carriers do not encrypt the data (i.e., using GEA/0) in order to detect the use of traffic or protocols they do not like (e.g., Skype), leaving customers unprotected. GEA/3 seems to remain relatively hard to break and is said to be in use on some more modern networks. If used with USIM to prevent connections to fake base stations and downgrade attacks, users will be protected in the medium term, though migration to 128-bit GEA/4 is still recommended.

The first public cryptanalysis of GEA/1 and GEA/2 (also written GEA-1 and GEA-2) was done in 2021. It concluded that although using a 64-bit key, the GEA-1 algorithm actually provides only 40 bits of security, due to a relationship between two parts of the algorithm. The researchers found that this relationship was very unlikely to have happened if it was not intentional. This may have been done in order to satisfy European controls on export of cryptographic programs.

== Standards information ==
The GSM systems and services are described in a set of standards governed by ETSI, where a full list is maintained.

== Patents and open source implementations ==
Several open-source software projects exist that provide certain GSM features, such as a base transceiver station by OpenBTS and the Osmocom stack providing various parts.

Patents remain a problem for any open-source GSM implementation, because it is not possible for GNU or any other free software distributor to guarantee immunity from all lawsuits by the patent holders against the users. Furthermore, new features are being added to the standard all the time which means they have patent protection for a number of years.

The original GSM implementations from 1991 may now be entirely free of patent encumbrances, however patent freedom is not certain due to the United States' "first to invent" system that was in place until 2012. The "first to invent" system, coupled with "patent term adjustment" can extend the life of a U.S. patent far beyond 20 years from its priority date. It is unclear at this time whether OpenBTS will be able to implement features of that initial specification without limit. As patents subsequently expire, however, those features can be added into the open-source version. As of 2011, there have been no lawsuits against users of OpenBTS over GSM use.

== See also ==
- Cellular network
- Enhanced Data Rates for GSM Evolution (EDGE)
- GSM forwarding standard features codes – list of call forward codes working with all operators and phones
- GSM frequency bands
- GSM modem
- GSM services
  - Cell Broadcast
  - GSM localization
  - Multimedia Messaging Service (MMS)
  - NITZ Network Identity and Time Zone
  - Wireless Application Protocol (WAP)
- GSM-R (GSM-Railway)
- GSM USSD codes – Unstructured Supplementary Service Data: list of all standard GSM codes for network and SIM related functions
- Handoff
- High-Speed Downlink Packet Access (HSDPA)
- International Mobile Equipment Identity (IMEI)
- International Mobile Subscriber Identity (IMSI)
- Long Term Evolution (LTE)
- MSISDN Mobile Subscriber ISDN Number
- Nordic Mobile Telephone (NMT)
- ORFS
- Personal communications network (PCN)
- RTP audio video profile
- Simulation of GSM networks
- Standards
  - Comparison of mobile phone standards
  - GEO-Mobile Radio Interface
  - GSM 02.07 – Cellphone features
  - GSM 03.48 – Security mechanisms for the SIM application toolkit
  - Intelligent Network
  - Parlay X
  - RRLP – Radio Resource Location Protocol
- Um interface
- Visitors Location Register (VLR)
