= Output Radio Frequency Spectrum =

ORFS stands for Output RF Spectrum, where 'RF' stands for Radio Frequency.

The acronym ORFS is used in the context of mobile communication systems, e.g., GSM. It stands for the relationship between (a) the frequency offset from the carrier and (b) the power, measured in a specific bandwidth and time, produced by the mobile station due to effects in modulation and power ramping and switching. ORFS measurements are defined and required in order to prove conformance by various institutions, e.g., the U.S. Federal Communications Commission (FCC) or ETSI.
