= Evelyn Hu =

American physicist

Evelyn L. Hu
- Born: 1947 (age 78–79); New York City, New York, USA
- Education: Barnard College; Columbia University
- Known for: Fabrication of nanoscale devices
- Awards: NAE (2002); NAS (2008); IEEE Andrew Grove Award; IEEE Maxwell Medal
- Scientific career
- Fields: Applied Physics
- Workplaces: Harvard University; U C Santa Barbara
- Doctoral advisor: Chien-Shiung Wu

Evelyn L. Hu (Chinese: 胡玲) is the Tarr-Coyne Professor of Applied Physics and of Electrical Engineering at Harvard University. Hu has made major contributions to nanotechnology by designing and creating complex nanostructures. Her work has focused on nanoscale devices made from compound semiconductors and on novel devices made by integrating various materials, both organic and inorganic. She has also created nanophotonic structures that might someday facilitate quantum computing.

== Early life and education ==
Hu's parents emigrated to the United States from China in 1944–1945. She was born in New York City. An alumna of Hunter College High School, she received her B.A. from Barnard College in 1969, and her M.A. and Ph.D. from Columbia University, all in physics, in 1971 and 1975, respectively. Hu's PhD advisor was nuclear physicist Chien-Shiung Wu.

== Career and research ==
Hu was employed at AT&T's Bell Laboratories from 1975 to 1984, when she joined University of California, Santa Barbara (UCSB) as a full professor, a position she has held since 1984. She served UCSB's Department of Electrical and Computer Engineering as vice chair from 1989 to 1992 and as chair from 1992 to 1994. In 2008, Hu was elected to the United States National Academy of Sciences. She has been a pioneer in the fabrication of nanoscale electronic and photonic devices, and was named Gordon McKay Professor of Applied Physics and Electrical Engineering in Harvard University's School of Engineering and Applied Sciences (SEAS), effective January 1, 2009. She has also served since 2000 as scientific co-director of the California NanoSystems Institute, a joint initiative at UCSB and the University of California, Los Angeles.

Hu's influential work in nanofabrication has included high-resolution patterning and high-resolution etching of circuits onto nanoscale materials. She has also developed biological approaches to nanotechnology, using biological assembly pathways to control the composition and structure of novel devices. Some of her research ideas led to her co-founding of Cambridge, Massachusetts-based Cambrios Technology, a start-up that is developing new, cost-effective materials of importance for electronic device applications. At UCSB, she has led the Institute for Quantum Engineering, Science and Technology, the National Science Foundation-funded Center for Quantized Electronic Structures and Center for Robotic Systems in Microelectronics, and the UCSB component of the National Science Foundation's National Nanofabrication Users Network.

According to a winter (November) 2012 online news story article released by the Harvard School of Engineering and Applied Sciences (featured on the Harvard University web site's home page), Hu is exploring the use of gallium nitride wafers at the nano-scale level in the formation and use of quantum dots in nanophotonics (the study of and manipulation of light via materials- photonics- at the nano-scale level), which could eventually find use in smartphone screens and the (less-risky, non-invasive) fluorescent tagging of biological cells for their study in health and disease. Hu is a reviewing editor at the journal Science.

== Awards ==
- 1994, Fellow, Institute of Electrical and Electronics Engineers (IEEE)
- 1995, Fellow, American Physical Society
- 1998, Fellow, American Association for the Advancement of Science
- 2002, elected to the National Academy of Engineering
- 2008, elected to the National Academy of Sciences
- 2013, Honorary Doctorate from Heriot-Watt University
- 2019, IEEE Andrew Grove Technical Field Award.
- ETH Day 2019, Hu was awarded the only honorary doctorate degree of the year from the ETH in Zurich.
- 2021, IEEE/RSE James Clerk Maxwell Medal
