= Diggers, Hatters & Whores =

2008 book by Stevan Eldred-Grigg

- Author: Stevan Eldred-Grigg
- Publication date: 2008

Diggers, Hatters & Whores is a 2008 history book about gold rushes in New Zealand, written by Stevan Eldred-Grigg.

The book's thesis is that the rushes presented a challenge to the economic status quo in New Zealand, which was at the time politically and economically controlled by farmer politicians. The book details the social and economic factors that drove people, both New Zealanders and foreigners, to dig for gold, and examines the degree to which they were able to fulfil their goals of social and economic independence.

The book was used by Booker Prize winning author Eleanor Catton as research material for her novel, The Luminaries.
