= Stevan Eldred-Grigg =

New Zealand writer

Stevan Treleaven Eldred-Grigg is a New Zealand author of thirteen novels, eleven history books and various essays and short stories. His works of fiction and non-fiction explore the West Coast, Canterbury, the wider South Island and the whole of New Zealand. He also writes about Samoa, Shanghai, Germany, and Australia.

== Writings ==
In 1978 Eldred-Grigg completed a history PhD thesis at Australian National University called 'The pastoral families of the Hunter Valley, 1880–1914'

In 1987 he published his first novel, Oracles and Miracles, the story of two sisters growing up in Christchurch before and during World War II. It won second place in the 1988 Goodman Fielder Wattie Book Awards and subsequently was adapted for stage and radio. In 2020 Helen Mae Innes added zombies to the book creating Oracles & Miracles & Zombies published by Piwaiwaka Press.

Eldred-Grigg was the first living New Zealand writer of literary fiction to have had a novel translated into Chinese when Oracles and Miracles was published in Shanghai in 2002 under the title ‘剩’贤奇迹.

Stevan's writing shows he is passionate about freedom and democracy. Freedom and democracy, equality and inequality, justice and injustice, are questions at the heart of all his written works. He writes about class, ethnicity, gender, and many other topics in his numerous non-fiction works.

He was winner of the Blackball Writer's Residency in 2020, and winner of the Janet Frame Literary Trust Award in 2019.

== Bibliography ==
Memoirs:

- My History, I Think (Penguin, 1994)
- Green Grey Rain (Piwaiwaka Press, 2021)
- Not Swinging, Swooning (Piwaiwaka Press, 2024)

Novels:

- Oracles and Miracles (Penguin, 1987)
- The Siren Celia (Penguin, 1989)
- The Shining City (Penguin, 1991)
- Gardens of Fire (Penguin, 1993)
- Mum (Penguin, 1995)
- Blue Blood (Penguin, 1997)
- Sheng Xian Qu Ji (Yi-wen Shanghai, 2002)
- Shanghai Boy (Random House, 2006)
- Bangs (Penguin, 2013)
- Pru Goes Troppo (Piwaiwaka Press, 2020)
- Oracles & Miracles & Zombies (Piwaiwaka Press, 2022)

History:

- A Southern Gentry (AH & AW Reed, 1980, 1986)
- A New History of Canterbury (John McIindoe, 1982)
- Pleasures of the Flesh, (Reed Methuen, 1984)
- New Zealand Working People (Dunmore Press, 1990)
- The Rich (Penguin, 1996)
- Niu Xilan de Wenxue Lucheng (Unitas Taipei, 2004)
- Diggers, Hatters & Whores (Random House, 2008)
- The Great Wrong War: New Zealand Society in the First World War (Random House, 2010)
- People, People, People (David Bateman, 2011)
- White Ghosts, Yellow Peril: China and New Zealand 1790–1950 (Otago University Press, 2014)
- Phoney Wars: New Zealand Society in the Second World War (Otago University Press, 2017)
