= GSM 02.07 =

Technical specification pertaining to mobile stations

The SMG GSM 02.07 Technical Specification (Version 7.1.0 Release 1998) called Digital cellular telecommunications system (Phase 2+); Mobile Stations (MS) features defines Mobile Station (MS) features and to classifies them according to their type and whether they are mandatory or optional. The MS features detailed in this specification do not represent an exhaustive list.
