= Philippe Dupuis (engineer) =

Frencd telecommunication engineer (1931-2019)

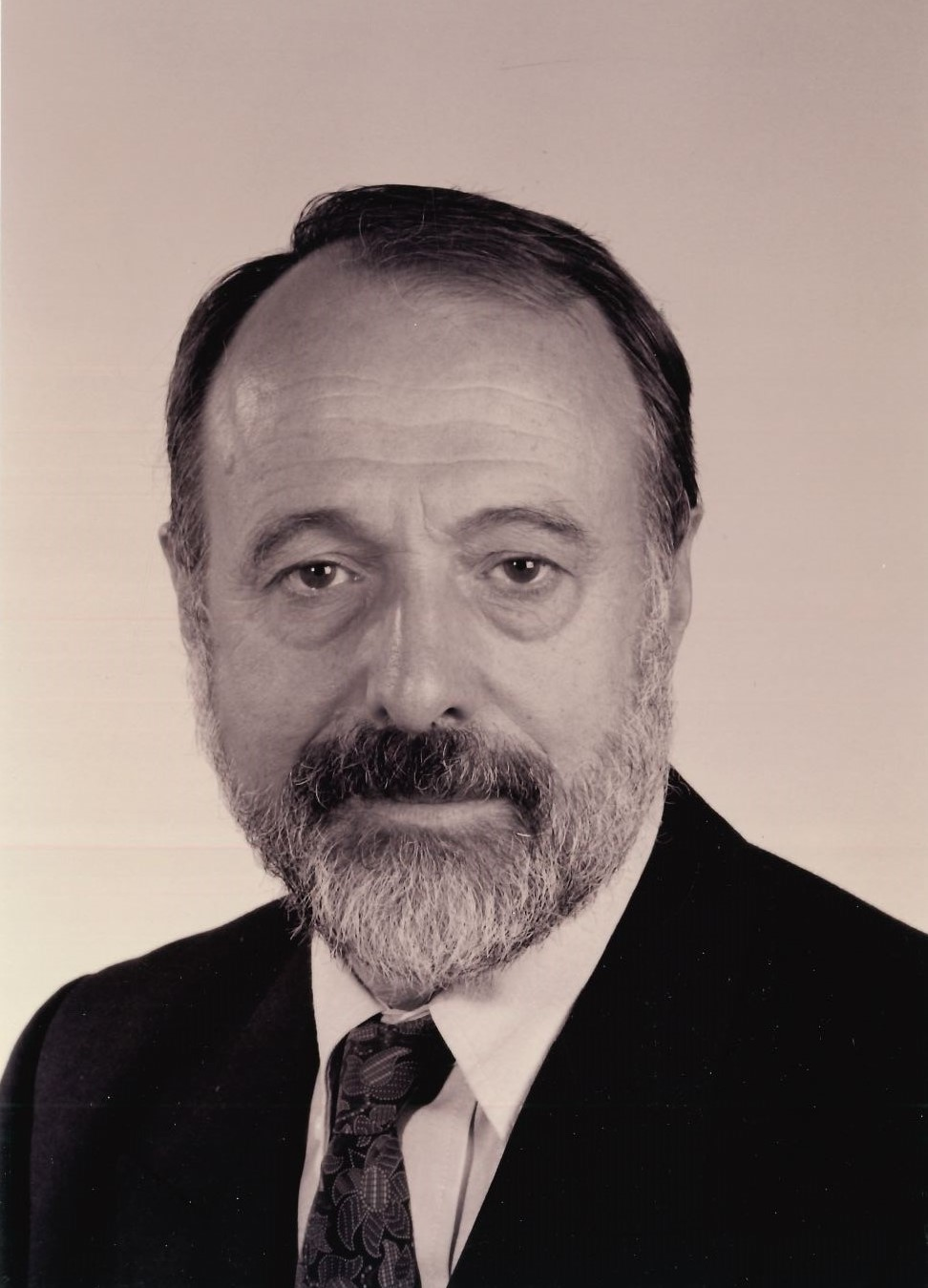
- Philippe Dupuis in 1999 in Paris
- Born: 1931; French
- Died: February 7, 2019 (aged 87–88)
- Occupation: Telecommunications engineer
- Known for: Co-founding GSM Technology

Philippe Dupuis (French pronunciation: [filip dypɥi]; 1931-2019) was a French post-war telecommunications engineer, polytechnician, and a radiocommunications expert born in Saint Romain de Colbosc, Normandy, France. He co-invented Global System for Mobile Communications (GSM). He was on the ETSI Technical Committee and also served as the president of the GSM group.

== Early life and education ==
Dupuis received a laureate in mathematics in the general competition of high schools and colleges in 1949. He graduated from Polytechnique in 1956.

== Career ==
Dupuis started his career at PTT or "Postes, Télégraphes et Téléphones de France," in 1956. He supervised the launch of the first French mobile VHF telephony network covering Paris. Dupuis joined France Câbles & Radio, a state-owned company in 1962. The company sent him to Senegal for three years to oversee the activities in West Africa. In 1973, Dupuis led the creation of the Telecommunications Department for external networks. He re-joined PTT as the head of the international services division. He became the managing director of SOFRECOM, a French telecommunication service company, in 1978. Three years after that, he became an advisor to the director-general of telecommunications for mobile services.

He contributed to the establishment of Franco-German R & D cooperation for the successful development of the GSM standard. Dupuis served as the lead of the French delegation for GSM at CEPT Groupe Special Mobile, chaired by Thomas Haug, and European Telecommunication Standard Institute, ETSI.

He became an independent consultant after the adoption of GSM in 1992. He was then appointed as the president of the GSM group in April 1992 to succeed Thomas Haug. As the president, he contributed to the developments in 2G and laid the groundwork for 3G. He retired from the business in 1996.

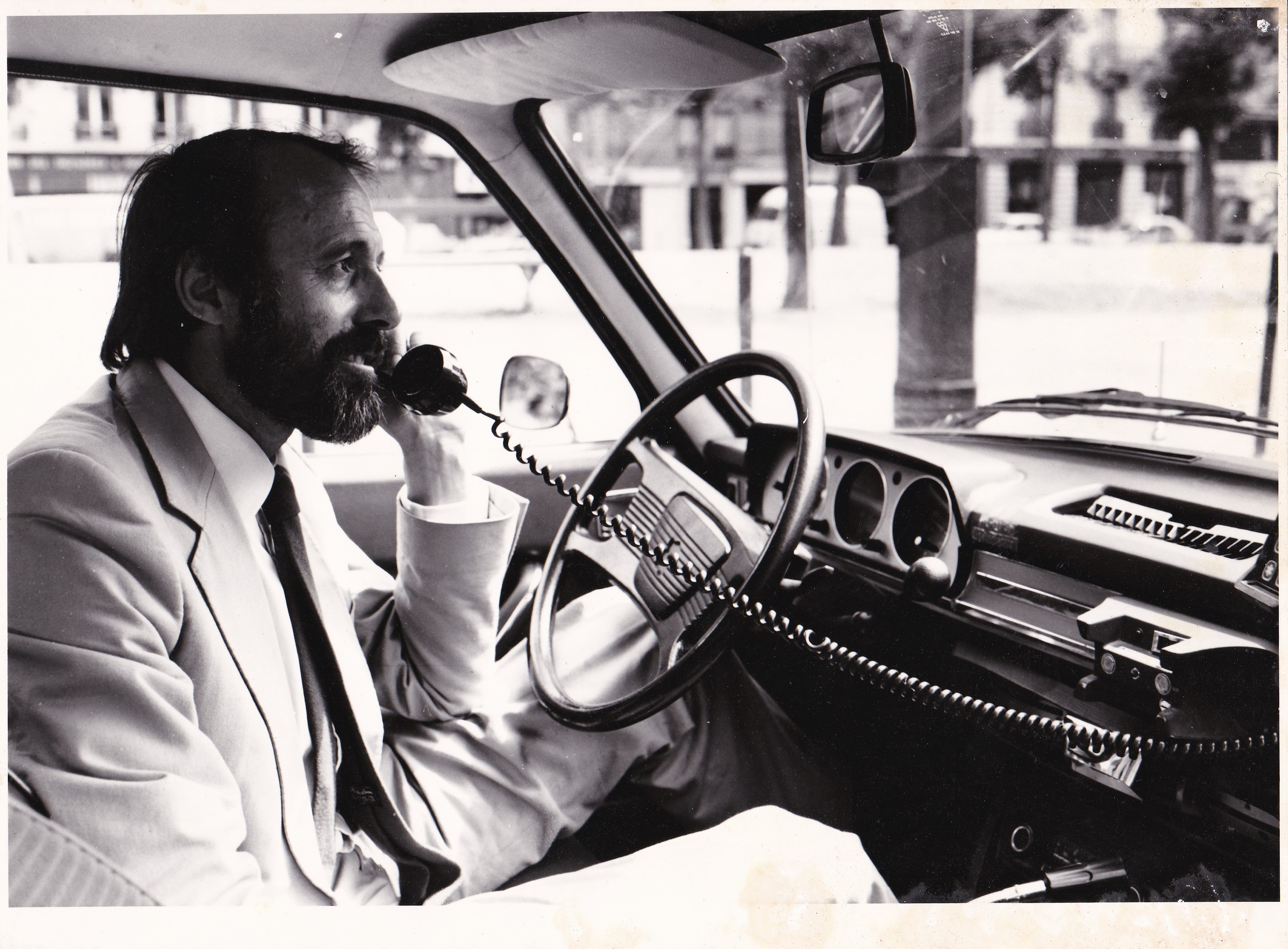
Philippe Dupuis carphone

== Honors and awards ==
In 1996, he received knighthood as he became Knight of the Legion of Honour and National Officer of Merit. He, along with Thomas Haug, received the James Clerk Maxwell Medal in 2018. Prince William presented the award to them in Edinburg for their contributions to the first digital mobile telephone standard.

== Personal life ==
Dupuis married three times. He had two sons, a daughter, and 6 grandchildren.

== Death ==
Dupuis died on February 7, 2019, at the age of 87, in Paris, France, due to acute leukemia.
