= IEEE/RSE James Clerk Maxwell Medal =

- Awarded for: Groundbreaking contributions that have had an exceptional impact on the development of electronics and electrical engineering, or related fields
- Country: United States, United Kingdom
- Presented by: Institute of Electrical and Electronics Engineers and Royal Society of Edinburgh
- First award: 2007
- Website: www.ieee.org/about/awards/medals/maxwell.html

The IEEE/RSE James Clerk Maxwell Medal is an award given by the IEEE and Royal Society of Edinburgh, UK. It is named after James Clerk Maxwell (1831–1879), who made fundamental contributions to the classical theory of electromagnetic radiation. The award is presented annually, and was established in 2006.

The award is given annually to outstanding individuals in recognition of: "groundbreaking contributions that have had an exceptional impact on the development of electronics and electrical engineering, or related fields".

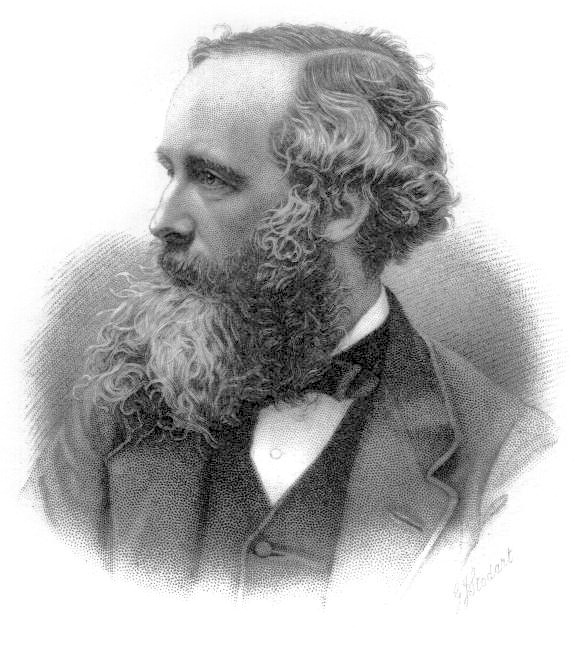
James Clerk Maxwell (1831–1879)

== Background ==
The medal was jointly established in 2006 by the IEEE and Royal Society of Edinburgh UK, with initial funding by Wolfson Microelectronics Ltd. Following the acquisition of Wolfson Electronics by Cirrus Logic Inc., in 2014, the medal is now supported by Cirrus Logic. Recipients receive an honorarium, a gold medal, a bronze replica and a certificate. The award is given to one or two individuals. Award recommendations are established by a committee for the award, and typically are approved by the IEEE Board of Directors in November of each year.

== Recipients ==
The following people have received the IEEE/RSE James Clerk Maxwell Medal:

- 2007: Irwin M. Jacobs and Andrew J. Viterbi
- 2008: Tim Berners-Lee
- 2009: Alberto Sangiovanni-Vincentelli
- 2010: Amar G. Bose
- 2011: Marcian Edward Hoff
- 2012: Gerhard M. Sessler
- 2013: Richard M. White and Richard S. Muller
- 2014: David Neil Payne
- 2015: Lynn Conway
- 2016: Geoffrey Hinton
- 2017: No award
- 2018: Thomas Bryn Haug and Philippe Dupuis
- 2019: David Flynn and Dave Jaggar
- 2020: No award
- 2021: Evelyn Lynn Hu
- 2022: Ingo Wolff
- 2023: M. C. Frank Chang
- 2024: Kam Yin Lau
- 2025: Robert W. Heath Jr.
- 2026: Paul B. Corkum
