= Mobile broadband modem =

Modem providing Internet access via a wireless connection

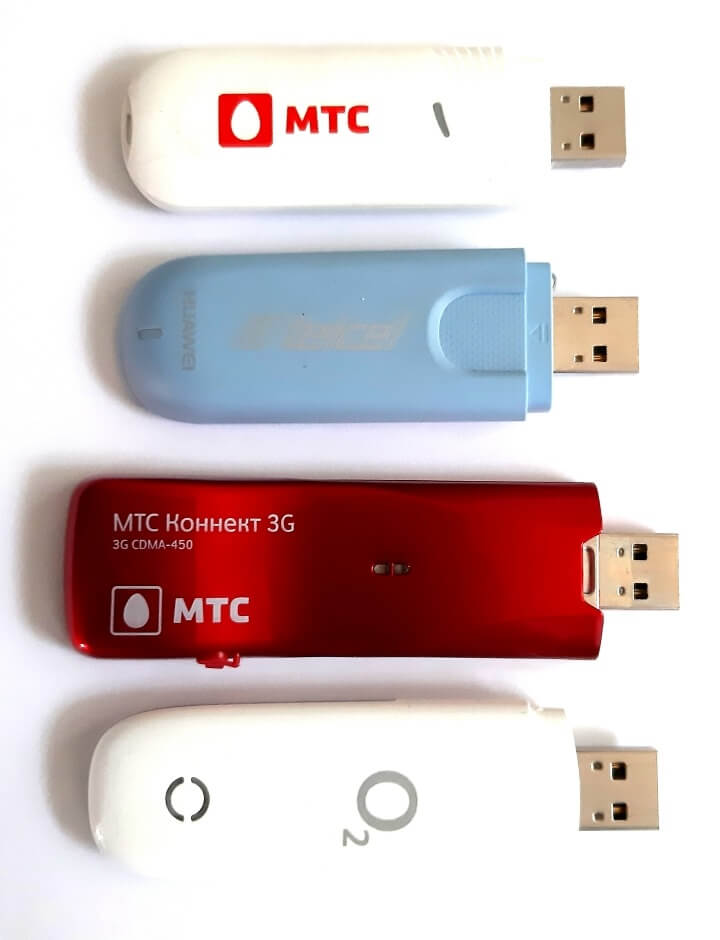
USB broadband modems

A mobile broadband modem, also known as wireless modem or cellular modem, is a type of modem that allows a personal computer or a router to receive wireless Internet access via a mobile broadband connection instead of using telephone or cable television lines. A mobile Internet user can connect using a wireless modem to a wireless Internet service provider (ISP) to get Internet access.

== History ==
=== 1G and 2G ===
While some analogue mobile phones provided a standard RJ11 telephone socket into which a normal landline modem could be plugged, this only provided slow dial-up connections, usually 2.4 kilobits per second (kbit/s) or less. In 1984, Spectrum Information Technologies released the first mobile broadband modem, the Bridge, which connected to the analogue Advanced Mobile Phone System (AMPS) of the United States. It connected in between the telephone socket and a computer's serial port, providing its own proprietary error correction routines in order to reduce the incidence of dropped connections during handover, a major problem when plugging into cellular transceivers directly. Because of its proprietary protocols, it necessitated a corresponding device at the site of the called party or central office, which was branded the Span.

The first personal computer with a built-in mobile broadband modem was the ITC 286 CAT, a laptop by Intelligence Technology Corporation. Released in 1988, it featured a Hayes-compatible AMPS modem capable of transmitting data at 1.2 kbit/s.

The next generation of phones, known as 2G (for 'second generation'), were digital, and offered faster dial-up speeds of 9.6 kbit/s or 14.4 kbit/s without the need for a separate modem. A further evolution called HSCSD used multiple GSM channels (two or three in each direction) to support up to 43.2 kbit/s. All of these technologies still required their users to have a dial-up ISP to connect to and provide the Internet access - it was not provided by the mobile phone network itself.

The release of 2.5G phones with support for packet data changed this. The 2.5G networks break both digital voice and data into small chunks, and mix both onto the network simultaneously in a process called packet switching. This allows the phone to have a voice connection and a data connection at the same time, rather than a single channel that has to be used for one or the other. The network can link the data connection into a company network, but for most users the connection is to the Internet. This allows web browsing on the phone, but a PC can also tap into this service if it connects to the phone. The PC needs to send a special telephone number to the phone to get access to the packet data connection. From the PC's viewpoint, the connection still looks like a normal PPP dial-up link, but it is all terminating on the phone, which then handles the exchange of data with the network. Speeds on 2.5G networks are usually in the 30–50 kbit/s range.

=== 3G ===
3G networks have taken this approach to a higher level, using different underlying technology but the same principles. They routinely provide speeds over 300 kbit/s. Due to the now-increased internet speed, internet connection sharing via WLAN has become a workable reality. Devices which allow internet connection sharing or other types of routing on cellular networks are also called cellular routers.

A further evolution is the 3.5G technology HSDPA, which provides speeds of multiple megabits per second. Several of the mobile network operators that provide 3G or faster wireless internet access offer plans and wireless modems that enable computers to connect to and access the internet. These wireless modems are typically in the form of a small USB based device or a small, portable mobile hotspot that acts as a WiFi access point (hotspot) to enable multiple devices to connect to the internet. WiMAX based services that provide high speed wireless internet access are available in some countries and also rely on wireless modems that connect to the provider's wireless network. Wireless USB modems are nicknamed "dongles".

Early 3G mobile broadband modems used the PCMCIA or ExpressCard ports, commonly found on legacy laptops. The expression "connect card" (instead of connection card) had been registered and used the first time by Vodafone as brand for its products but now it is a generic trademark used in colloquial or commercial speech for similar products too, made by different manufacturers. Major producers are Huawei, Option N.V. and Novatel Wireless. More recently, the expression "connect card" is also used to identify internet USB keys. Vodafone brands this type of device as a Vodem.

Often a mobile network operator will supply a 'locked' modem or other wireless device that can only be used on their network. It is possible to use online unlocking services that will remove the 'lock' so the device accepts SIM cards from any network.

== Variants ==
=== Standalone ===
Standalone mobile broadband modems are designed to be connected directly to one computer. In the past the PCMCIA and ExpressCard standards were used to connect to the computer. As USB connectivity became almost universal, these various standards were largely superseded by USB modems in the early 21st century. Some models have GPS support, providing geographical location information.

=== Integrated router ===
Many mobile broadband modems sold nowadays also have built-in routing capabilities. They provide traditional networking interfaces such as Ethernet, USB and Wi-Fi.

=== Smartphones and tethering ===
Numerous smartphones support the Hayes command set and therefore can be used as a mobile broadband modem. Some mobile network operators charge a fee for this facility, if able to detect the tethering. Other networks have an allowance for full speed mobile broadband access, which—if exceeded—can result in overage charges or slower speeds.

An Internet-accessing smartphone may have the same capabilities as a standalone modem, and, when connected via a USB cable to a computer, can serve as a modem for the computer. Smartphones with built-in Wi-Fi also typically provide routing and wireless access point facilities. This method of connecting is commonly referred to as "tethering."

== Service providers ==
There are competing common carriers broadcasting signal in most countries.

== Technologies ==
- CDMA2000 (3G)
- CDPD
- EDGE
- EVDO (3G, although could be considered to be 3.5G due to its peak bandwidth)
- DC-HSPA+
- GPRS Core Network
- GPRS (2.5G)
- HiperMAN (pre-4G)
- HSDPA (3.5G)
- HSPA+ 3.75G
- iBurst (pre-4G)
- IP Multimedia Subsystem
- LTE (4G)
- LTE Advanced (4G)
- NR (5G)
- UMTS (3G)
- WiBro (pre-4G)
- WiMAX (pre-4G)

== See also ==
- Access Point Name
- Dongle
- EVDO
- GSM modem
- Laptop
- MiFi
- Mobile broadband
- Netbook
- Smartphones
- Terminal node controller
- Tethering
