= Spectrum Information Technologies =

Defunct mobile broadband modem manufacturer

Spectrum Information Technologies, Inc.
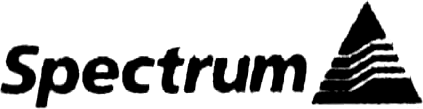
- Trade name: Spectrum Cellular Corporation (1983–1989)
- Formerly: Spectrum Cellular Communications Corporation (1983–1989)
- Type: Public
- Industry: Telecommunications; Computer networking
- Founded: 1983; 43 years ago
- Founders: Dana C. Verrill; Robert C. Adair; Patrick A. Mayben
- Defunct: 1999; 27 years ago
- Fate: Pivoted to e-commerce in 1999 and renamed itself to SITI-Sites.com, Inc.; ceased trading on November 14, 2006
- Number of employees: 170 (1993, peak)
- Website: spectruminfo.com at the Wayback Machine (archived 1998-12-12)

Spectrum Information Technologies, Inc. (SITI), formerly Spectrum Cellular Communications Corporation (SPCL; doing business as Spectrum Cellular Corporation), was an American telecommunications and networking hardware company active from 1983 to 2006. It was a pioneer in mobile broadband technology, being the first company to harness the cellular telephone network for computer networking purposes. The company's Bridge, released in 1984, was the first cellular modem ever released. Despite its innovative prowess, the company never had a profitable year. Originally based in Dallas, Texas, Spectrum moved its headquarters to Long Island, New York, in 1992.

Throughout the mid-1990s, the company was embroiled in a number of high-profile controversies regarding securities fraud. Spectrum made headlines following the hiring of John Sculley, formerly the CEO of Apple Computer, in October 1993 and his acrimonious exit only four months later. In 1999, they changed their name to SITI-Sites.com, Inc., and pivoted to e-commerce. In November 2006, the company's shareholders agreed to liquidate its assets in full.

== History ==
=== Foundation (1983–1985) ===
Spectrum Information Technologies, Inc., was founded in late 1983 as Spectrum Cellular Communications Corporation. The company's three founders were Dana C. Verrill, Robert C. Adair, and Patrick A. Mayben. Verrill, Spectrum's principal founder, was named its president and chief executive officer (CEO). Verrill, Adair, and Mayben raised US$50,000 in capital to incorporate Spectrum in Dallas, Texas. Spectrum became a publicly traded company less than a year after its inception, filing its IPO on the Nasdaq in September 1984.

Spectrum was founded shortly after the activation of the Advanced Mobile Phone System (AMPS) in the United States, in October 1983. AMPS was the first cellular telephone network widely deployed in the United States, providing analog mobile phone service to those who could afford the first cellular phones. Around the same time, Tandy Corporation of Fort Worth, Texas, introduced the TRS-80 Model 100, the first commercially successful notebook computer. Early adopters of both the Model 100 and AMPS realized that it was possible to use the nascent cellular network as a medium for the TRS-80's optional modem; by connecting the modem to their mobile phone's transceiver, they were able transmit data to a remote location wirelessly. The use of these early mobile phones as cellular modems was highly precarious, however, and coverage at this point was spotty. Data loss and connections being dropped completely were frequent occurrences, largely due to the handover from one cell to another cell on the core network briefly breaking the connection. While these handovers usually only resulted in barely audible dropouts in verbal conversations, such dropouts are catastrophic for serial data communication, especially at higher baud rates. Spectrum was founded to market dedicated cellular modems that could allow computer systems to receive and transmit cellular data reliably on the go.

Spectrum's prototypes came to fruition as the Bridge and the Span, which were unveiled in June 1984 and August 1985 respectively. The Bridge was the first cellular modem ever released to the public. Spectrum subcontracted the manufacturing of both the Bridge and the Span at Electronic Assembly Corporation in Neenah, Wisconsin.

The Bridge was a small, videocassette-shaped device that connected in between the computer's RS-232 serial port and the transceiver of a mobile phone. It provided enhanced error detection and correction routines to keep received signals as consistent as possible, in order to reduce the incidence of data loss and dropped connections at handovers. During transmission at handovers, the Bridge buffers the data sent to the mobile phone's transceiver and resumes transmission after the end of signal loss. The ability for standard modems to pause the transmission in this manner for even a split second was not universal, necessitating the development of a corresponding device for the called party. Spectrum therefore developed the Span, essentially the same device as the Bridge but for fixed stations, such as residential or commercial modems for peer-to-peer connections or for online service providers. The speed of the original Bridge and Span was fixed to the Bell 103 standard of 300 baud. Spectrum released new models capable of 1,200 baud in April 1986; the company released another successor capable of 2,400 baud in 1989.

=== Growth (1985–1988) ===
Spectrum posted losses in both fiscal years 1984 and 1985. In August 1985, Spectrum made their first major business transaction when they signed an agreement with Ameritech Cellular, allowing Ameritech to resell the Bridge and the Span to their subscribers. In late 1985, Spectrum negotiated with CompuServe, the largest online service provider at the time, to install Span units at CompuServe's data centers across the United States. By February 1986, five of CompuServe's data centers had the Span installed. By April 1986, when the number of mobile phones in use reached 250,000, Spectrum had an installed base of 1,200 cellular modems among the public, most being used on a trial basis. Their Dallas headquarters meanwhile employed 21 people.

After 1986, interest in Spectrum's cellular modems grew rapidly, and the company began talks with multiple cellular providers to provide Spectrum's equipment at MSTOs as a value-add for their customers. By 1989, a total of 54 cellular providers and 43 online service providers had offices equipped with Spectrum's technologies. In addition to the cash flow from these deals, Spectrum's business with these cellular providers helped them to refine their error detection and correction protocols. In 1987, Spectrum secured the first patent on their protocols. Collectively these protocols were eventually codified in 1988 as SPCL and licensed to other cellular modem manufacturers. It saw use in the ITC 286 CAT, the first ever laptop with a built-in cellular modem, released in late 1988 by Intelligence Technology Corporation, who were also based in Dallas.

While Spectrum had little difficulty convincing telecommunications companies about the relevance of their products, the company were met with reluctance by computer hardware resellers, who associated cellular technology exclusively with voice calls and not data communication. In a bid to get closer to these resellers, in July 1987 the company conducted its first acquisition with USSI, a Dallas-based computer hardware and software reseller. They followed suit in March 1989 when they acquired Dealer Service Business Systems, a system integrator of laptops for salespeople and other field workers, based in Moline, Illinois.

=== Near-bankruptcy and outside investment (1988–1993) ===
In March 1988, a group of California investors acquired a 50.01-percent stake in Spectrum Cellular. In September 1989, Spectrum Cellular changed its name to Spectrum Information Technologies, making Spectrum Cellular a wholly owned subsidiary in the process. By 1990, over 12,000 of Spectrum's modems were in active use in North America.

While Spectrum by the turn of the decade had experienced much growth, the company had yet to return a profitable year. On the brink of bankruptcy, in 1991 the company filed a second IPO and brought in Peter Caserta of the Caserta Group, an investment firm based in Manhasset, New York, to the company's board. Despite in-fighting among the board of investors over the concerns that Caserta was trying to orchestrate a complete takeover of the company, they promptly made Caserta the CEO of Spectrum and demoted Verrill to its chairman. In 1992, he spearheaded the move of Spectrum Information's headquarters from Dallas to Manhasset in order to be closer to his namesake investment firm. Caserta then proceeded to make several extravagant demands and expenditures, including $500,000 for office renovations, $50,000 for a speedboat, a company Mercedes-Benz, a doubled annual salary of $250,000, and an option to buy two million shares of stock. By mid-1992, Verrill was demoted as chairman but remained on the board of directors. He was later named head of Spectrum International, the company's newly formed international unit, which planned to market the company's hardware in Europe.

Throughout the mid-1990s, the company was embroiled in a number of high-profile controversies regarding potential securities fraud. In a December 1992 press release, Spectrum falsely asserted ownership of over 200 patents, when in reality they possessed only three, with the remainder being pending applications. Months later, Spectrum's stock tripled to $11.75 on the Nasdaq over the course of six days after signing a patent licensing agreement with AT&T on May 19, 1993, with Caserta boasting that the deal would generate "hundreds of millions of dollars" for Spectrum. A lawyer from AT&T refuted this claim, stating the contract was only worth a few million. After the CNBC commentator Dan Dorfman's skeptical commentary on Spectrum led to a mass sell-off of the company's stock, its ticker price fell to $6 by May 21. Meanwhile, the discrepancy in Caserta's reporting prompted the Securities Exchange Commission (SEC) and the U.S. Attorney for the Eastern District of New York to launch an investigation into Spectrum for stock manipulation that same month. Spectrum withheld information about this investigation from its shareholders until January 1994.

=== Sculley's four-month tenure, collapse, and pivot (1993–2006) ===
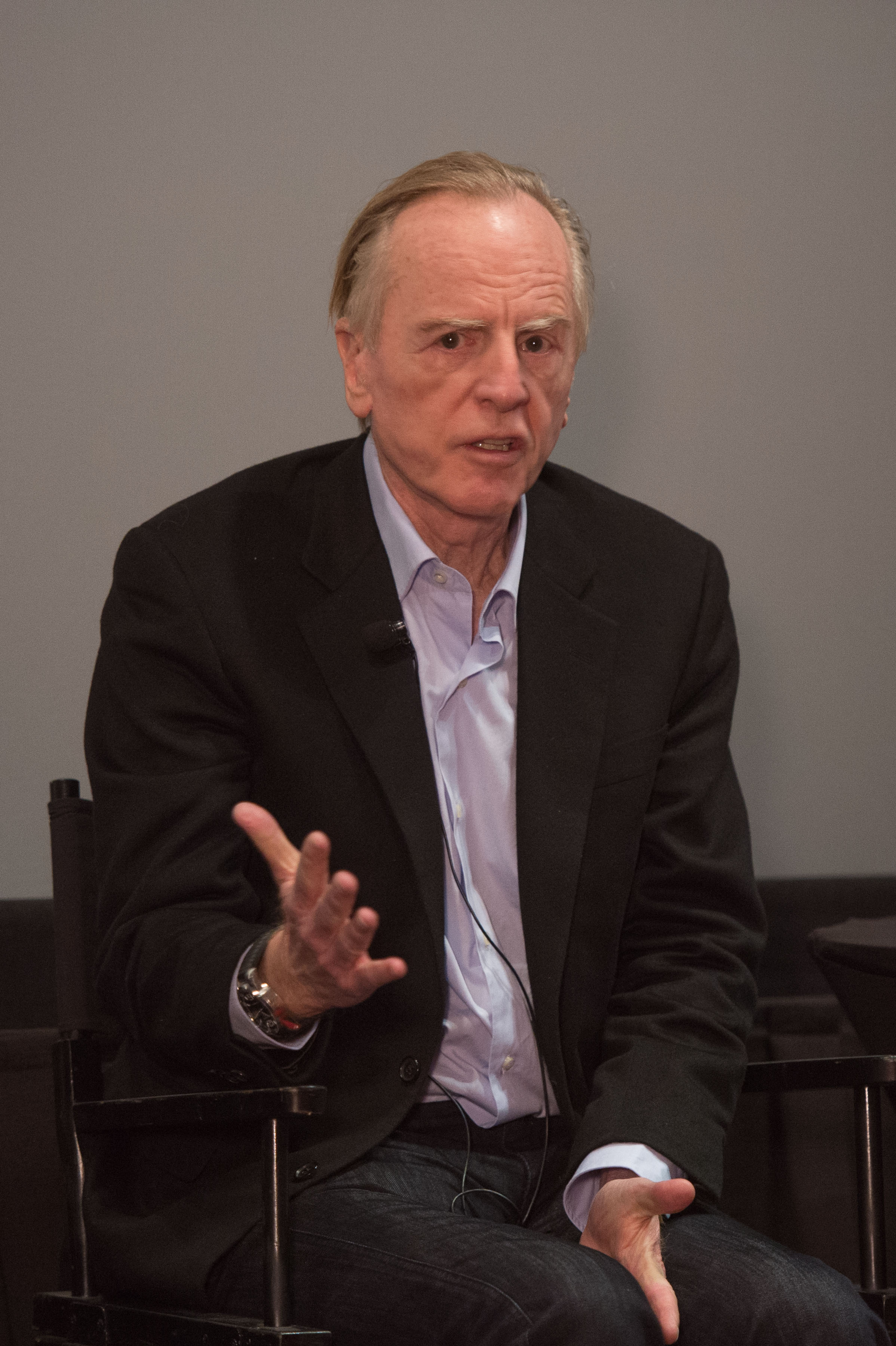
John Sculley (pictured in 2014) was named CEO of Spectrum Information five days after quitting Apple Computer from the same post.

Spectrum made major headlines on October 18, 1993, when they announced that they had secured John Sculley, the CEO of Apple Computer from 1983 to 1993, as Spectrum's new CEO. Sculley had resigned as CEO of Apple only five days prior. Scully was initially optimistic about Spectrum, calling the company "a little gem that fell in my lap" and predicting that wireless communications would overtake personal computers as the primary force of innovation in technology in the 2000s. Although Sculley assured naysayers that he had a team of lawyers and technical experts examine Spectrum's patent applications and its legal issues, when asked by an interviewer the day before officially taking the CEO position about Spectrum's 1990 delisting from the Nasdaq due to failing to meet capital requirement and an investigation by the SEC against its underwriter, Scully admitted: "It sounds like you know more about it than I do at this point". Scully's hiring led to Caserta's demotion to vice chairman and Verrill's resignation from the company.

Sculley's tenure at Spectrum ended in acrimony only four months later, on February 7, 1994, when he both resigned and filed a $10-million lawsuit against Caserta, accusing him of withholding knowledge of its financial problems, including net losses, shareholder suits, and SEC investigations. Spectrum counter-sued Sculley for breaching his employment contract. Sculley's conflict with Caserta escalated into exchanges of insults and lawsuits that continued for months, eventually settling out of court. In October 1996, Caserta was sentenced to 27 months in prison on federal charges of conspiring to defraud numerous small start-ups through the Caserta Group. The spectacle demoralized Sculley, who reflected later in 1998: "It was a terribly embarrassing situation. I was so burned out and so hurt by how I'd been treated by the board at Apple that I just didn't use good judgment. I ended up with a bunch of bad characters". Despite the bitter feelings toward Spectrum and the blow to his professional reputation at the time, Sculley went on to invest successfully in a number of other high-tech start-ups over the followings years.

Following the Sculley debacle, Spectrum consistently failed to achieve profitability and ultimately filed for Chapter 11 bankruptcy reorganization in January 1995. They emerged from bankruptcy in August 1996 but continued to operate at a loss. In 1999, the company exited the field of networking hardware entirely and pivoted to e-commerce, changing its name to SITI-Sites.com, Inc., in the process. In November 2006, the company's shareholders agreed to liquidate its assets in full and cease trading, although the company remained operational on paper as a non-practicing entity, collecting patent fees and filing lawsuits against entities they accused of infringing their patents.

== See also ==
- History of mobile phones
- Tethering
