= Godspeed =

Godspeed is a parting statement, wishing someone a prosperous journey or success.

Godspeed may also refer to:

== Literature ==
- Godspeed (Sheffield novel), a 1993 science fiction novel by Charles Sheffield
- Godspeed, an unpublished novel by Will Christopher Baer
- Godspeed, a 2002 novel and 2007 short film by Lynn Breedlove

== Music ==
=== Bands ===
- Godspeed, an American heavy metal band participated in the Black Sabbath tribute album Nativity in Black
- Godspeed, a 1999 band featuring Leif Garrett
- Godspeed You! Black Emperor, a Canadian band often abbreviated to Godspeed

=== Albums ===
- Godspeed (The Blessed Madonna album) or the title song, 2024
- Godspeed (Glasvegas album) or the title song, 2021
- Godspeed (Symphorce album), 2005
- Godspeed (Vincent album), 2011
- God Speed (album), by Masami Okui, or the title song, 2006
- Godspeed (EP), by Anberlin, or the title song, 2006
- Godspeed, by Don Trip, 2015
- Godspeed, by Mortal, 1998
- Godspeed, by Morten Schantz, 2017

=== Songs ===
- "Godspeed", by Alter Bridge from Walk the Sky, 2019
- "Godspeed", by BT from Movement in Still Life, 1999
- "Godspeed" (Camila Cabello song), 2024
- "Godspeed", by Frank Ocean from Blonde, 2016
- "Godspeed", by Jenny Lewis from Acid Tongue, 2008
- "Godspeed", by Patti Smith from Easter, 1996 reissue
- "Godspeed", by The Contortionist from Clairvoyant, 2017
- "Godspeed", by The Red Jumpsuit Apparatus from Lonely Road, 2009
- "Godspeed", by The Reklaws from Sophomore Slump, 2020
- "Godspeed", by Wage War from Manic, 2021
- "Godspeed (Sweet Dreams)", by Radney Foster from See What You Want to See, 1999
- "God Speed", by Amberlin from Cities, 2007
- "God Speed", by Crossfaith from Ark, 2024
- "God Speed", by Zach Bryan from DeAnn, 2019
- "Perfect Circle / God Speed", by Mac Miller from GO:OD AM, 2015

== Other uses ==
- Godspeed (character), featured in DC Comics
- Godspeed (film), a 2016 Taiwanese black comedy road caper film
- "Godspeed" (The Flash episode), an episode of The Flash
- God Speed (painting), 1900, by Edmund Blair Leighton
- Godspeed (ship), on the 1606–1607 voyage that resulted in the founding of Jamestown, Virginia

== See also ==
- "God Spede the Plough", an early sixteenth-century manuscript poem
- Goodspeed (surname), as an alternative or older version of the surname
