= Goodspeed =

Goodspeed may refer to:

- Goodspeed (surname), including a list of people with the name
- Goodspeed Airport, in East Haddam, Connecticut, US
- Goodspeed Glacier, a small hanging glacier in Antarctica
- Goodspeed Hall, a dormitory of the University of Chicago (Illinois, US)
- Goodspeed House, a historic structure in Barnstable, Massachusetts, US
- Goodspeed Memorial Library, in Wilton, Maine, US
- Goodspeed Musicals, a non-profit organization dedicated to preserving and encouraging music
- Goodspeed Nunataks, a group of nunataks at the Fisher Glacier in Antarctica
- Goodspeed Opera House Tony-award-winning musical theater
- Goodspeed Publishing, a company in Chicago, Illinois, US, that specialized in publishing works of local history and biography
- Goodspeed (internet provider), a roaming free mobile internet provider
- Godspeed (ship), one of the ships sent to found Jamestown, Virginia
