= Intelligence Technology Corporation =

American computer company

- Company type: Private
- Industry: Computer
- Founded: 1986; 40 years ago in Dallas, Texas, United States
- Founders: Walker Morris; Charles Oliver Ekwurzel
- Defunct: 2000; 26 years ago
- Products: Laptops

Intelligence Technology Corporation (ITC) was an American computer company that was a pioneer in mobile broadband technology. Based in Dallas, Texas, and active from 1986 to 2000, ITC was the first company to release a laptop with a built-in cellular modem, the ITC 286 CAT, in late 1988. The company developed several other laptops with built-in cellular modems until the early 1990s.

== History ==
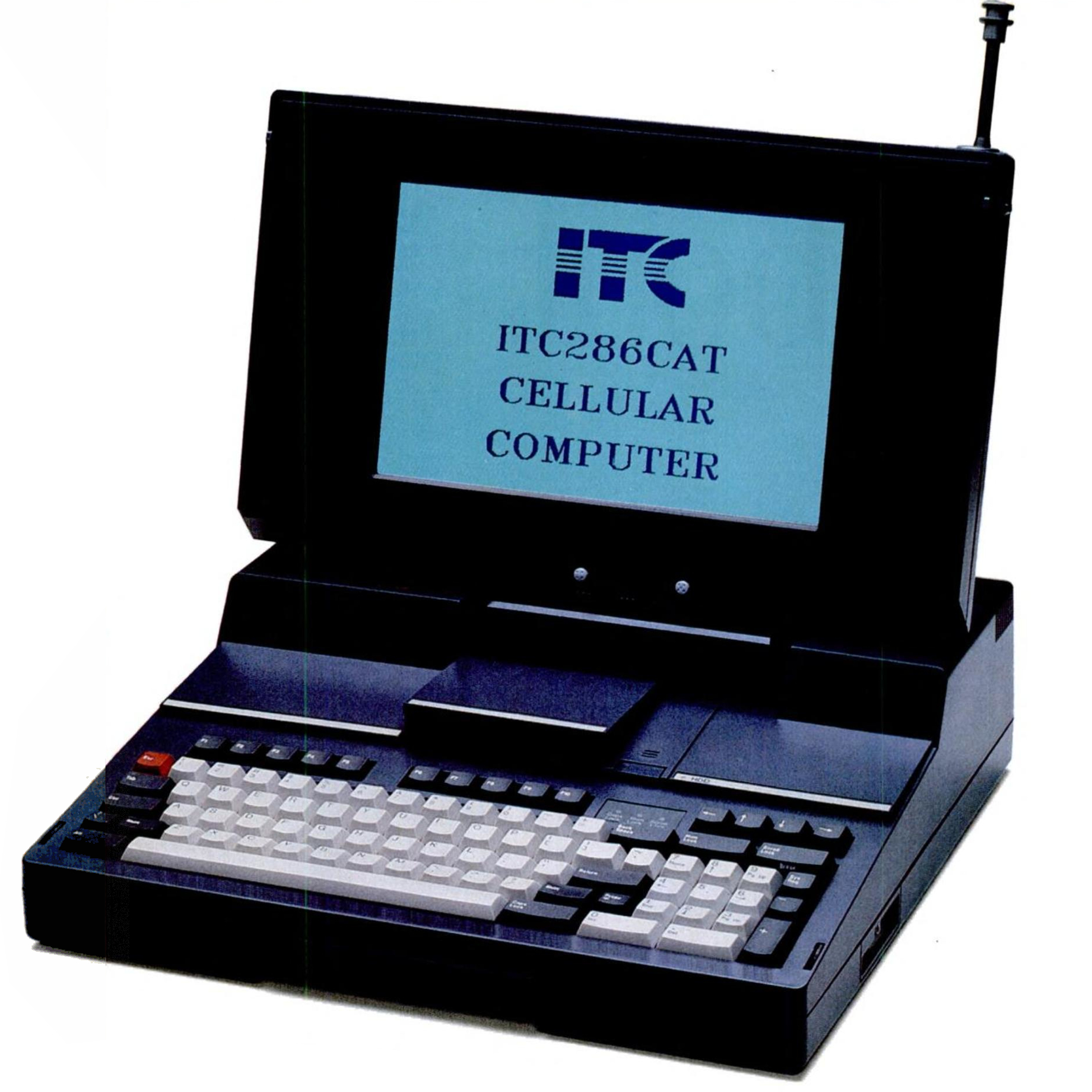
The ITC 286 CAT was the first laptop with a built-in cellular modem when it was released in 1988.

Intelligence Technology Corporation was founded in 1986 by Walker Carroll Morris (1931–2006) and Charles Oliver Ekwurzel (1941–2019) in Dallas, Texas. Morris was a five-year veteran of the IBM PC clone industry before founding ITC; Ekwurzel was Morris's brother-in-law. ITC was originally a supplier for original equipment manufacturers of laptops before developing their own computer products. Development of the company's first product began in October 1987 when Morris, president of ITC, talked to Fred Neal Jr., an owner of a cellular phone license on the East Coast. Neal was hired as ITC's director, and together they developed three patents for the company's first product, the ITC 286 CAT, a laptop with a built-in cellular modem.

By April 1988, ITC had raised $750,000 in development funds, acquired through friends and investors in Marshall, Texas. In raising money the company, Morris intentionally eschewed venture capital, stating in May 1989: "We won't even talk to them. We're not about to give this company away to venture capitalists". Development of the 286 CAT took roughly eight months, with Morris hiring two engineers who developed the plans and schematics for what would become the laptop. By the middle of 1988, Morris contracted a Hong Kong manufacturer to produce the ITC 286 CAT (CAT short for Cellular AT), and by June 1988 the first four prototypes were shipped to various Fortune 500 companies for evaluation. The 286 CAT was originally slated to be marketed as the Form-Jet by Electronic Form Systems, a Carrollton-based systems integrator that was a subsidiary of Computer Language Research (a mainframe software vendor), but ITC ultimately decided to market the computer by themselves.

External image
- ITC 286 CAT exhibited at the 2022 Indianapolis Vintage Computer Club (by Christopher Petzel)

The ITC 286 CAT was first unveiled to the public at the Las Vegas Convention Center during the 1988 COMDEX/Fall. A month later, the laptop was released to third-party American dealers. (Note: In Canada, the ITC 286 CAT was introduced over a year later, in January 1990.) The ITC 286 CAT was the first laptop ever released with a built-in cellular modem. Based on an AMPS cellular modem designed by Spectrum Cellular, it was capable of both data and voice transmissions and sold with an Oki-manufactured mobile handset; alternatively, users could have purchased an optional handset or use the laptop's built-in microphone to use the laptop as a speakerphone. By May 1989, ITC had sold nearly 700 units of the ITC 286 CAT, with $15 million in commitments for further sales of the computer at that point in time; Morris projected 6,000 total unit sales by the end of 1989. ITC aimed the 286 CAT at field workers, such as drilling crew and construction workers, needing to connect to their headquarters remotely, as well as traveling salesmen and insurers.

In November 1989 at the Las Vegas Convention Center, ITC unveiled five new cellular-capable laptops. The flagship among them were the 386 CEL AND 386 XCEL. The CEL family featured a redesigned chassis, with a slimmer profile as well as the addition of a slot on the lid of the laptop, acting as a cradle for the included Motorola-manufacturer handset. For the CELs, ITC upgraded the original Hayes-compatible cellular modem of the 286 CAT to one compatible with Microcom's MNP 5 (Microcom Networking Protocol Level 5) protocol, based on technology from Motorola. This allowed the laptops to connect to any such compatible modem, eliminating the need for special base stations at the receiving end of cellular calls. By switching to this new cellular modem, the 386 CEL and 386 XCEL could also operate abroad on TACS and NMT networks in the United Kingdom and Nordic countries; by contrast, the 286 CAT was limited to use in the United States and Canada. The processors of the 386 CEL and 386 XCEL was also upgraded from Intel's 16-bit 80286 of the 286 CAT to Intel's 32-bit 80386.

As well as the CEL family, ITC also introduced the 386 PEP, featuring an i386SX processor and a modem featuring the company's proprietary ITC-RM (Reliable Mode) error-correcting protocol that was a modification of Microcom's MNP Level 4 protocol making it function similar to (but not identically to) MNP Level 10. ITC decided to develop their own protocol to save on development costs. The 386 PEP was available with or without a cellular modem. On the low-end, ITC announced the 286 PAL, a non-cellular version of the 286 CAT. At the lowest-end, ITC announced the V20 PUP, featuring the same ITC-RM cellular modem of the ITC 386 PEP but with an 8-bit, 8088-compatible NEC V20 processor instead of an i386. This was the company's lowest cost offering, at US$1,200 (equivalent to $2,837 in 2025), several thousand dollars less than the ITC 386 PEP.

The CEL family was released in the United States in March 1990. ITC released the V20 PUP in 1991, which also served as their final laptop. The company continued selling laptops into at least November 1992. Their final products were a pair of external ARDIS cellular modems—one for personal computers, the Cinque Modem/Radio, and the other for laptops, the Pocket Modem/Radio. They were released in 1993. In 2000, ITC formally dissolved in the state of Texas.
