= GSM modem =

Remote access device based on GSM technology

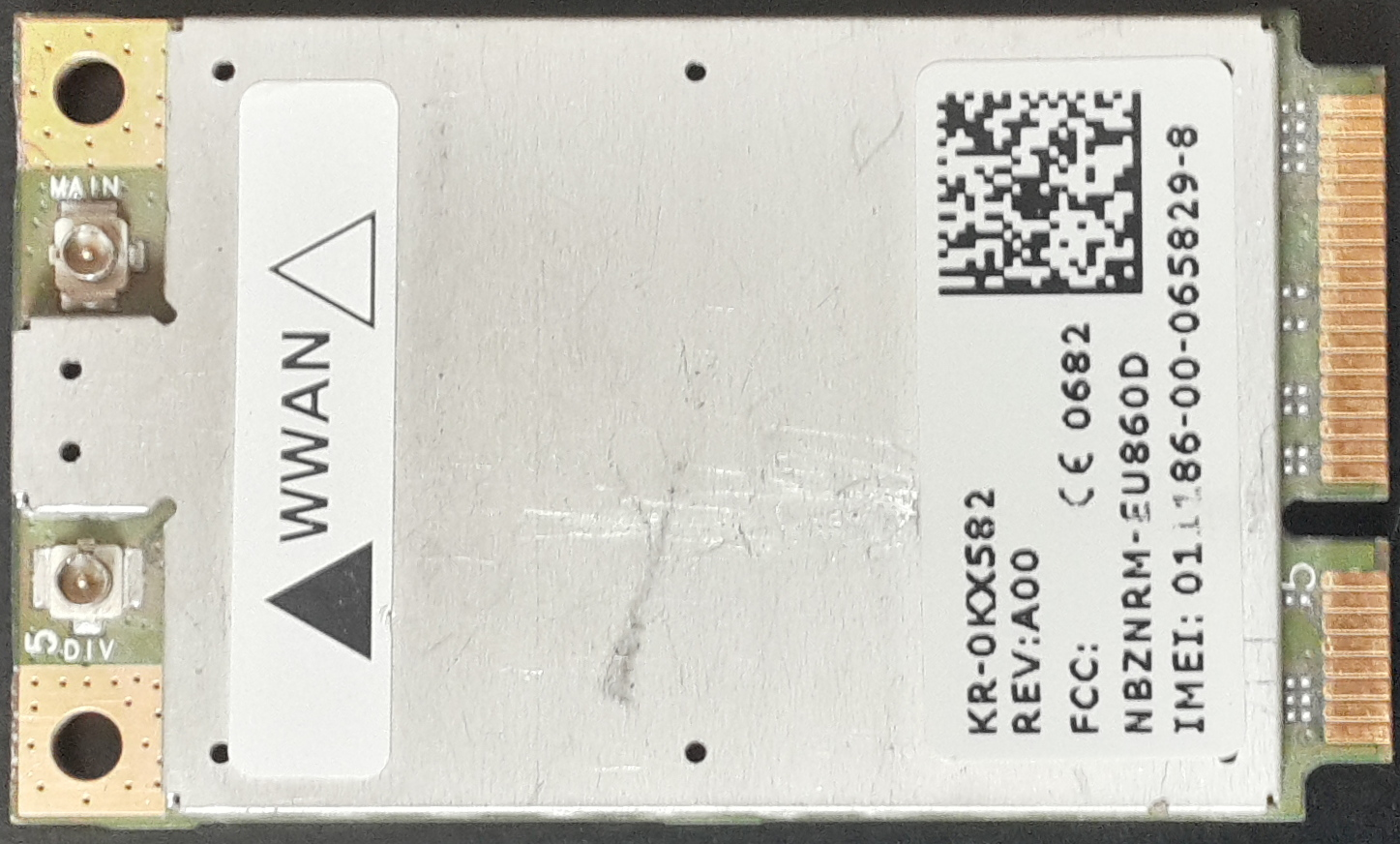
A mini-PCIe GSM module as found in a laptop

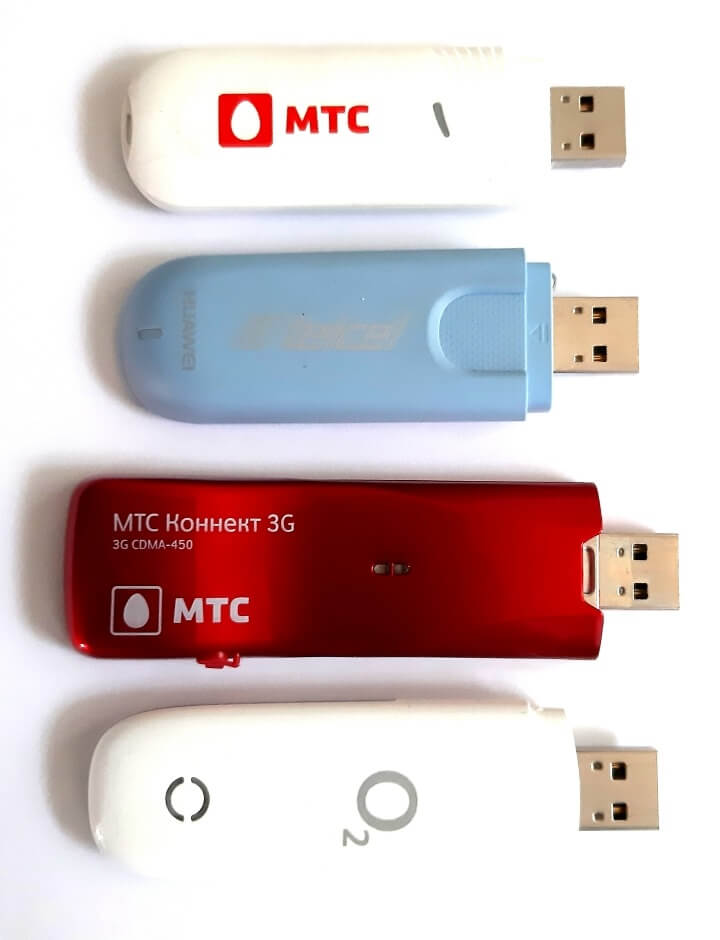
Several USB broadband modems

A GSM modem or GSM module is a device that allows electronic devices to communicate with each other over the GSM network. GSM is a standard for digital cellular communications, which means that it provides a platform for mobile devices to communicate with each other wirelessly. The GSM module is a specialized device that enables a device to send and receive data over the GSM network.

The GSM network is an essential component of modern communication systems. It is a standard used by mobile devices to communicate with each other wirelessly. The GSM network provides a reliable and secure platform for communication, which makes it a preferred choice for many applications.

The history of the GSM module dates back to the 1980s when the GSM network was first introduced. The first GSM module was designed to work with analogue phones, and it was not until the late 1990s that digital GSM modules were introduced. Today, the GSM module is an essential component used in various communication systems.

== Function ==
A GSM module works by connecting to the GSM network through a SIM card. The SIM card provides the module with a unique identification number, which is used to identify the device on the network. The GSM module then communicates with the network using a set of protocols, which allows it to send and receive data.

The GSM network is a digital cellular network that uses a set of protocols to enable communication between devices. The network is divided into cells, which are each serviced by a base station. The base station communicates with the devices in its cell, and the cells are interconnected to form a network.

The GSM module plays a crucial role in the communication between devices and the GSM network. It is responsible for establishing and maintaining the communication link between the device and the network. The module also handles the encryption and decryption of data, which ensures the security of the communication.

There are different types of GSM modules, each with its own functionalities. Some modules are designed to handle voice communication, while others are designed for data communication. Some modules also have built-in GPS, which allows them to provide location information.

== Advantages ==
There are several advantages of using a GSM module in communication systems. Some of the most significant advantages are:

- Cost-effectiveness: GSM modules are cost-effective and can be used in a wide range of applications. They are also easy to install and maintain, which reduces the overall cost of the system.
- Versatility: GSM modules can be used in various communication systems, including remote monitoring and control, home automation systems, vehicle tracking systems, security systems, industrial automation systems, and healthcare systems. They can also be used in different types of devices, including mobile phones, laptops, and embedded systems.
- Reliability: The GSM network is known for its reliability, and the GSM module ensures that the communication link between devices and the network is established and maintained. This makes it a preferred choice for applications where reliability is essential, such as healthcare systems and security systems.
- Security:The GSM network provides a secure platform for communication, and the GSM module ensures that the data sent and received is encrypted and decrypted correctly. This makes it a preferred choice for applications where data security is essential, such as banking systems and healthcare systems.

== See also ==
- Tethering
- Mobile broadband modem
