= XCom Global =

Telecommunications company

XCom Global, Inc.
- Company type: Public
- Industry: Communication equipment
- Founded: (March 26, 2010)
- Defunct: (December, 2017)
- Headquarters: San Diego, CA
- Key people: Seiji Nishimura (Founder and Chief Executive Officer)
- Products: Wireless broadband PC cards, MiFi
- Website: Official website

XCom Global was a telecommunications company for international travelers, using pocket-sized MiFi service to provide unlimited data access.

== History ==
XCom Global was Established May 3, 2010 and started with two data plans: limited for over 130 countries and unlimited data plan for 21 countries. On September 15, 2010 it expand the unlimited plan to 32 countries. On April 2, 2011 it offered free Internet access for workers heading to Japan to aid in disaster recovery. On August 1, 2011 it introduced a Euro SIM card, expanding unlimited plan to over 60 countries.

It was selected as Finalist of TechAmerica High Tech Award on October 28, 2011. XCom Global's International MiFi Hotspot was awarded as The Best Products of 2011.

By January 3, 2012 it had expanded the unlimited plan to a total of 195 countries.

It announced "the closure of its USA operations" on November 10, 2017.

== Products ==
XCom Global had two products; MiFi and USB. MiFi could be shared among several internet device(smartphone, laptop, etc.) at the same time. XCom covered multiple country trips with multiple devices.
