= Goodspeed (internet provider) =

Wi-Fi hotspot

- Product logo
- Manufacturer: Uros Ltd
- Series: U100
- Compatible networks: GPRS/EDGE/GSM 850 / 900 / 1800 / 1900; HSPA+/HSDPA/HSDPA/UMTS 850 / 900 / 1900 / 2100; Downlink up to 21.1 Mbps; Uplink up to 5.76 Mbps
- Dimensions: 123 mm (4.8 in) H 63 mm (2.5 in) W 13 mm (0.51 in) D
- Weight: 127 g (4.5 oz)
- Battery: 2550 mAh; micro USB charging
- Display: 1 in (25 mm) LCD 128×64 pixels
- Connectivity: WLAN IEEE 802.11 b/g/n
- Development status: April 2014, available

Goodspeed is a mobile Wi-Fi hotspot developed and produced by Uros Ltd and manufactured in Finland by Sanmina Corporation. This mobile hotspot-router is used to connect up to 5 Wi-Fi enabled clients to a private WLAN.

The Goodspeed provides Internet access for WiFi enabled peripheral devices by establishing a WPA/WPA2 secured connection between Goodspeed and any type of portable WiFi device, laptop, mobile phone, digital camera and tablet. Goodspeed accesses the local cellular network through SIM cards that are stored inside the device. The SIM cards are provided by Uros Ltd as part of the Goodspeed service. The device has the shape and size of a smartphone and a display that communicates the current status, connectivity, strength of the signal, SSID and password of the network.

Goodspeed coverage map August 2014

== Awards ==
- iF product design award 2013, International Forum Design
- 100 Mejores Ideas del año 2014 (One of the 100 Top Business Ideas of the Year 2014), Actualidad Económica
- Goodspeed 4G won Mobile Breakthrough Awards' Mobile Hotspot Product of the Year, 2017

== See also ==
- MiFi
