= Godspeed (Sheffield novel) =

1993 novel by Charles Sheffield

Godspeed is a 1993 novel by American author Charles Sheffield.

== Reception ==
Karen Joy Fowler of The Washington Post wrote that Sheffield is "most interested in spinning an adventure rather than in thinking about the variations in sexuality, politics and philosophies that might result under such conditions" and "focuses on the technology of space travel with a vivid and satisfying imagination, and on the adventurous plot." Fowler opined that the pace "never flags" and praised the "satisfyingly smart and exciting climax." David Brin of Science Fiction Age wrote that it is not the novel's "many routine competencies" that stand out but rather the "unexpected and the untraditional in its resolution of what happened back in Erin’s misty past". Kirkus Reviews called it "passably diverting and involving—if you don't mind precarious plots and chirpy 16-year-old narrators."
