= Mobile broadband =

Marketing term

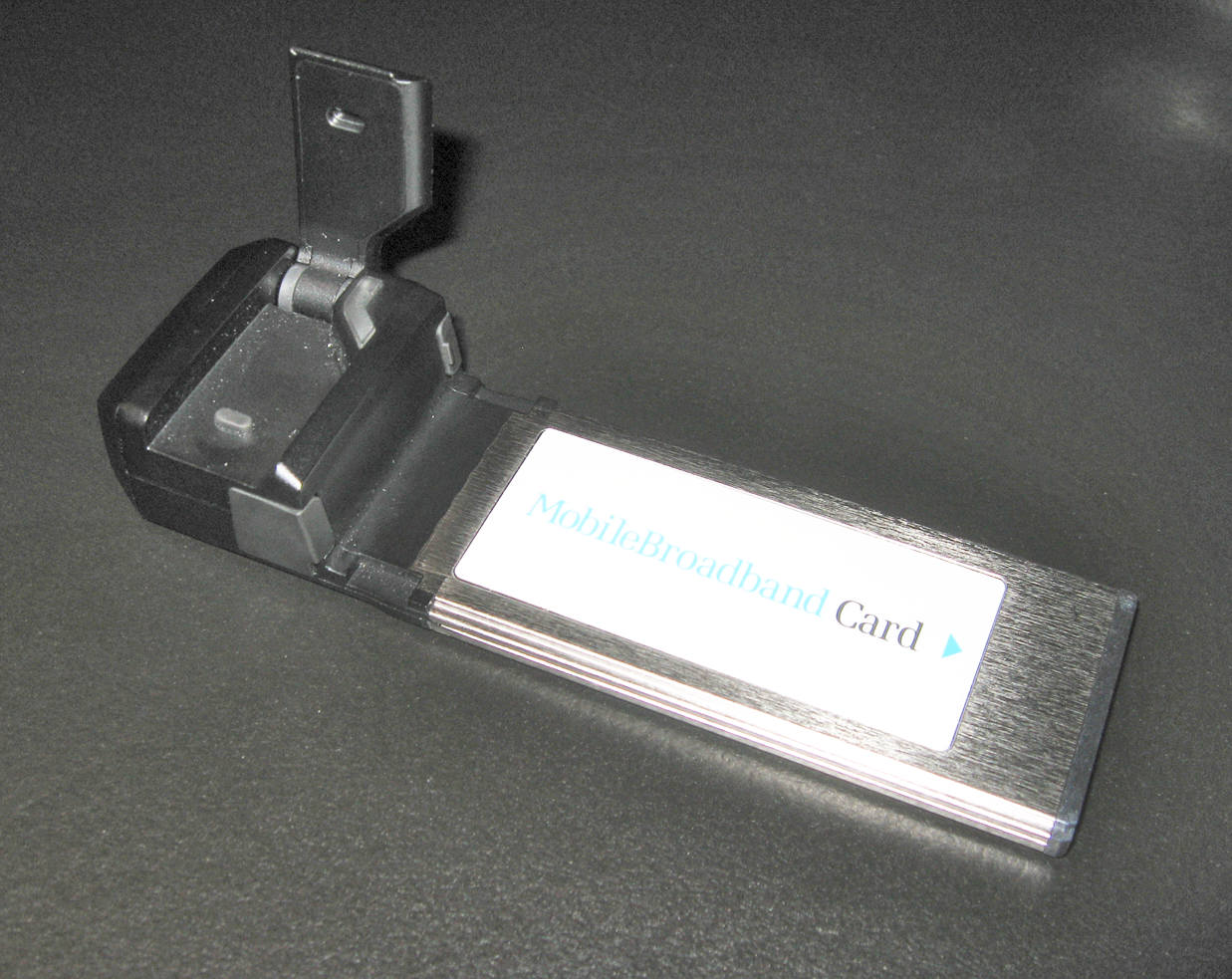
A mobile broadband modem in the ExpressCard form factor for laptop computers

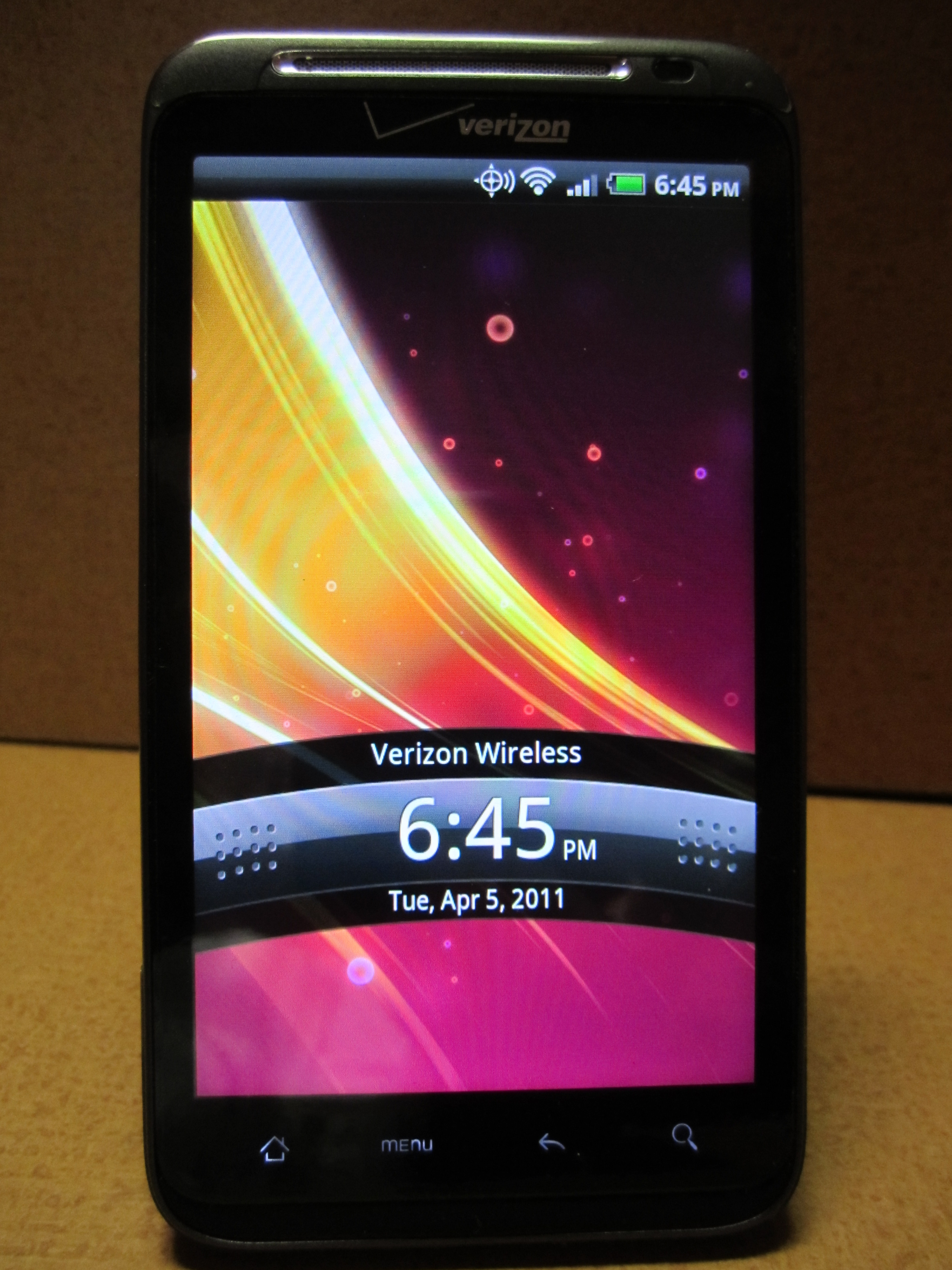
HTC ThunderBolt, the second commercially available LTE smartphone

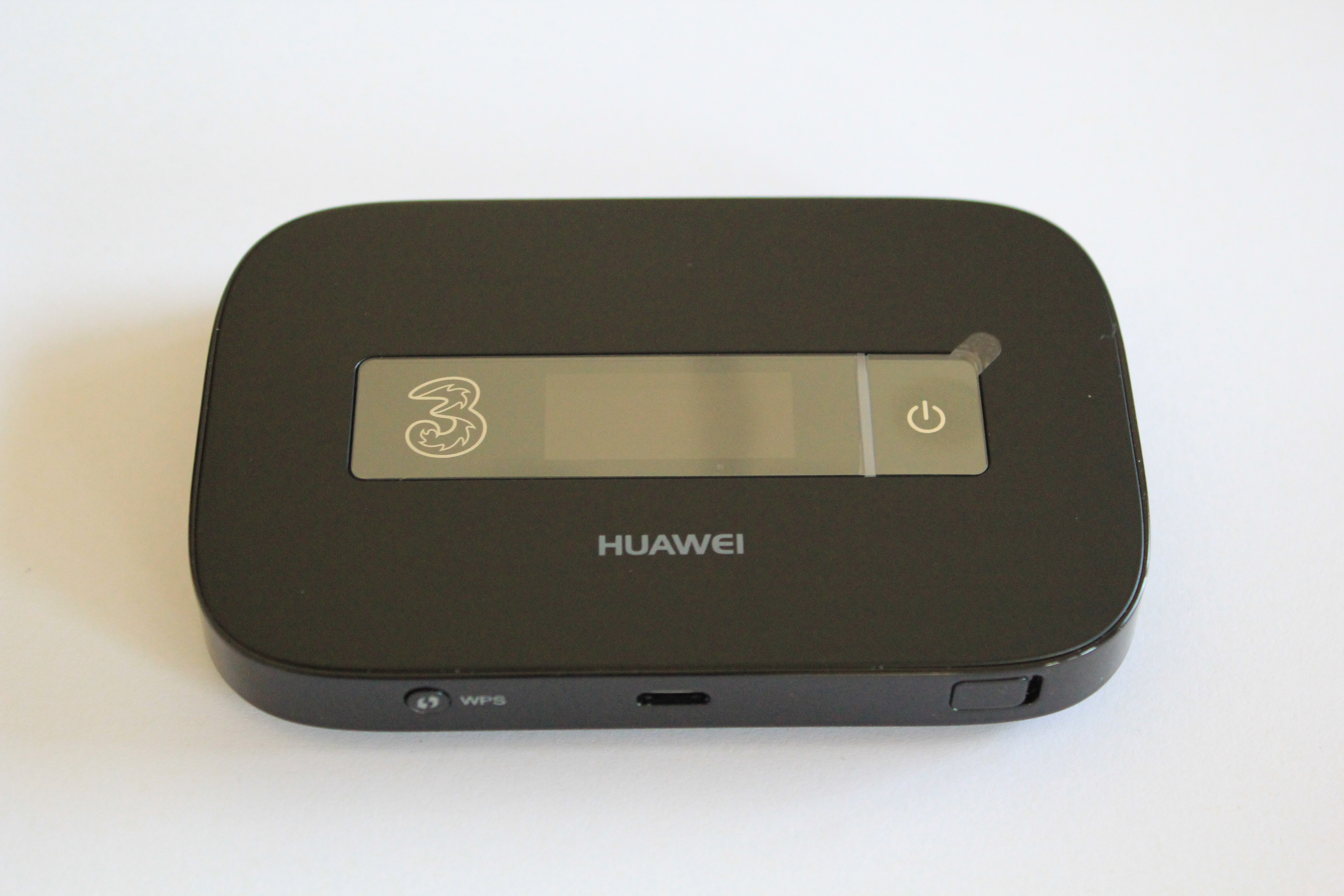
Mobile Broadband.

Mobile broadband, also referred in mobile device terminology as a mobile data, is the term for wireless Internet access via mobile (cell) networks. Access to the network can be made through a portable modem, wireless modem, or a tablet/smartphone (possibly tethered) or other mobile device. The first wireless Internet access became available in 1991 as part of the second generation (2G) of mobile phone technology. Higher speeds became available in 2001 and 2006 as part of the third (3G) and fourth (4G) generations. In 2011, 90% of the world's population lived in areas with 2G coverage, while 45% lived in areas with 2G and 3G coverage. Mobile broadband uses the spectrum of 225 MHz to 3700 MHz.

== Description ==
Mobile broadband is the marketing term for wireless Internet access delivered through cellular towers to computers and other digital devices using portable modems. Although broadband has a technical meaning, wireless-carrier marketing uses the phrase "mobile broadband" as a synonym for mobile Internet access. Some mobile services allow more than one device to be connected to the Internet using a single cellular connection using a process called tethering.

The bit rates available with mobile broadband devices support voice and video as well as other data access. Devices that provide mobile broadband to mobile computers include:

- PC cards, also known as PC data cards, and Express cards
- Mini PCI and Mini PCI Express cards that are integrated into the laptop
- USB and mobile broadband modems, also known as connect cards
- portable devices with built-in support for mobile broadband, such as laptops, smartphones/tablets, PDAs, and other mobile Internet devices.

Internet access subscriptions are usually sold separately from mobile service subscriptions.

== Generations ==
Roughly every ten years, new mobile network technology and infrastructure involving a change in the fundamental nature of the service, non-backwards-compatible transmission technology, higher peak data rates, new frequency bands, and/or wider channel frequency bandwidth in Hertz, becomes available. These transitions are referred to as generations. The first mobile data services became available during the second generation (2G).

Second generation (2G) from 1991:
Speeds in kbit/s	down and up
• GSM CSD	9.6
• CDPD	up to 19.2
• GSM GPRS (2.5G)	56–115
• GSM EDGE (2.75G)	up to 237

Third generation (3G) from 2001:
Speeds in Mbit/s	down	up
• UMTS W-CDMA	0.4	
• UMTS HSPA	14.4	5.8
• UMTS TDD	16	
• CDMA2000 1xRTT	0.3	0.15
• CDMA2000 EV-DO	2.5–4.9	0.15–1.8
• GSM EDGE-Evolution	1.6	0.5

Fourth generation (4G) from 2006:
Speeds in Mbit/s		down	up
•	HSPA+	21–672	5.8–168
•	Mobile WiMAX (802.16)	37–365	17–376
•	LTE	100–300	50–75
•	LTE-Advanced:		
	• while moving at high speeds	100	
	• while stationary or moving at low speeds	up to 1000	
•	MBWA (802.20)	80	

Fifth generation (5G) from 2018:
Speeds in Mbit/s		down	up
•	HSPA+	400–25000	200–3000
•	Mobile WiMAX (802.16)	300–700	186–400
•	5G	400–3000	500–1500

The download (to the user) and upload (to the Internet) data rates given above are peak or maximum rates and end users will typically experience lower data rates.

WiMAX was originally developed to deliver fixed wireless service with wireless mobility added in 2005. CDPD, CDMA2000 EV-DO, and MBWA are no longer being actively developed.

== Coverage ==
Mobile broadband Internet subscriptions in 2012 as a percentage of a country's population Source: International Telecommunication Union.

In 2011, 90% of the world's population lived in areas with 2G coverage, while 45% lived in areas with 2G and 3G coverage, and 5% lived in areas with 4G coverage. By 2017 more than 90% of the world's population is expected to have 2G coverage, 85% is expected to have 3G coverage, and 50% will have 4G coverage.

A barrier to mobile broadband use is the coverage provided by the mobile service networks. This may mean no mobile network or that service is limited to older and slower mobile broadband technologies. Customers will not always be able to achieve the speeds advertised due to mobile data coverage limitations including distance to the cell tower. In addition, there are issues with connectivity, network capacity, application quality, and mobile network operators' overall inexperience with data traffic. Peak speeds experienced by users are also often limited by the capabilities of their mobile phone or other mobile device.

== Subscriptions and usage ==
Worldwide broadband subscriptions
Users	2007	2010	2016	2019
World population	6.6 billion	6.9 billion	7.3 billion	7.75 billion
Fixed broadband	5%	8%	11.9%	14.5%
Developing world	2%	4%	8.2%	11.2%
Developed world	18%	24%	30.1%	33.6%
Mobile broadband	4%	11%	49.4%	83%
Developing world	1%	4%	40.9%	75.2%
Developed world	19%	43%	90.3%	121.7%

Broadband subscriptions by region
Subscription	Place	2007	2010	2014	2019
Fixed	Africa	0.1%	0.2%	0.4%	0.4%
Fixed	Americas	11%	14%	17%	22%
Fixed	Arab States	1%	2%	3%	8.1%
Fixed	Asia and Pacific	3%	6%	8%	14.4%
Fixed	Commonwealth of Independent States	2%	8%	14%	19.8%
Fixed	Europe	18%	24%	28%	31.9%
Mobile	Africa	0.2%	2%	19%	34%
Mobile	Americas	6%	23%	59%	104.4%
Mobile	Arab States	0.8%	5%	25%	67.3%
Mobile	Asia and Pacific	3%	7%	23%	89%
Mobile	Commonwealth of Independent States	0.2%	22%	49%	85.4%
Mobile	Europe	15%	29%	64%	97.4%

At the end of 2012 there were estimated to be 6.6 billion mobile network subscriptions worldwide (89% penetration), representing roughly 4.4 billion subscribers (many people have more than one subscription). Growth has been around 9% year-on-year. Mobile phone subscriptions were expected to reach 9.3 billion in 2018.

At the end of 2012 there were roughly 1.5 billion mobile broadband subscriptions, growing at a 50% year-on-year rate. Mobile broadband subscriptions were expected to reach 6.5 billion in 2018.

Mobile data traffic doubled between the end of 2011 (~620 Petabytes in Q4 2011) and the end of 2012 (~1280 Petabytes in Q4 2012). This traffic growth is and will continue to be driven by large increases in the number of mobile subscriptions and by increases in the average data traffic per subscription due to increases in the number of smartphones being sold, the use of more demanding applications and in particular video, and the availability and deployment of newer 3G and 4G technologies capable of higher data rates. Total mobile broadband traffic was expected to increase by a factor of 12 to roughly 13,000 PetaBytes by 2018 .

On average, a mobile laptop generates approximately seven times more traffic than a smartphone (3 GB vs. 450 MB/month). This ratio was forecast to fall to 5 times (10 GB vs. 2 GB/month) by 2018. Traffic from mobile devices that tether (share the data access of one device with multiple devices) can be up to 20 times higher than that from non-tethering users and averages between 7 and 14 times higher.

It has also been shown that there are large differences in subscriber and traffic patterns between different provider networks, regional markets, device and user types.

Demand from emerging markets has fuelled growth in both mobile device and mobile broadband subscriptions and use. Lacking widespread fixed-line infrastructure, many emerging markets use mobile broadband technologies to deliver affordable high-speed internet access to the mass market.

One common use case of mobile broadband is among the construction industry.

== Development ==
Service mark for GSMA mobile broadband

=== In use and under active development ===
==== GSM family ====
In 1995 telecommunication, mobile phone, integrated-circuit, and laptop computer manufacturers formed the GSM Association to push for built-in support for mobile-broadband technology on notebook computers. The association established a service mark to identify devices that include Internet connectivity. Established in early 1998, the global Third Generation Partnership Project (3GPP) develops the evolving GSM family of standards, which includes GSM, EDGE, WCDMA/UMTS, HSPA, LTE and 5G NR. In 2011 these standards were the most used method to deliver mobile broadband. With the development of the 4G LTE signalling standard, download speeds could be increased to 300 Mbit/s per second within the next several years.

==== IEEE 802.16 (WiMAX) ====
The IEEE working group IEEE 802.16, produces standards adopted in products using the WiMAX trademark. The original "Fixed WiMAX" standard was released in 2001 and "Mobile WiMAX" was added in 2005. The WiMAX Forum is a non-profit organization formed to promote the adoption of WiMAX compatible products and services.

=== In use, but moving to other protocols ===
==== CDMA family ====
Established in late 1998, the global Third Generation Partnership Project 2 (3GPP2) develops the evolving CDMA family of standards, which includes cdmaOne, CDMA2000, and CDMA2000 EV-DO. CDMA2000 EV-DO is no longer being developed.

==== IEEE 802.20 ====
In 2002, the Institute of Electrical and Electronics Engineers (IEEE) established a Mobile Broadband Wireless Access (MBWA) working group. They developed the IEEE 802.20 standard in 2008, with amendments in 2010.

== Edholm's law ==
Edholm's law in 2004 noted that the bandwidths of Wireless cellular networks have been increasing at a faster pace compared to wired telecommunications networks. This is due to advances in MOSFET wireless technology enabling the development and growth of digital wireless networks. The wide adoption of RF CMOS (radio frequency CMOS), power MOSFET and LDMOS (lateral diffused MOS) devices led to the development and proliferation of digital wireless networks in the 1990s, with further advances in MOSFET technology leading to rapidly increasing network bandwidth since the 2000s.

== See also ==
- 3G and 4G
- Broadband Internet access
- Digital Britain
- MiFi
- Mobile Enterprise
- Mobile phone
- Mobile VoIP
- SDIO card, an extension of the SD specification to include I/O functions
- Tethering
- 3rd Generation Partnership Project (3GPP), evolving GSM family of specifications
- 3rd Generation Partnership Project 2 (3GPP2), evolving CDMA family of specifications
