= Goodspeed (surname) =

As a surname, "Goodspeed" derives from "Godspeed", which in turn comes from the expression "God speed (you)", a wish for success and fortune on behalf of one setting out on a trip or an enterprise.

== People with the surname ==
- Dan Goodspeed (born 1977), US athlete in football
- Edgar J. Goodspeed (1871–1962), US theologian, scholar and author of numerous writings about the Bible
- Estella Goodspeed and Allen Goodspeed, wife and son of Arthur Scott Bailey
- Joey Goodspeed (born 1978), US athlete in football
- Marjorie Reynolds (1917–1997), US film actress, born Marjorie Goodspeed
- Paula Goodspeed (born 1978), US singer and American Idol auditioner, accused stalker of Paula Abdul
- Tyler Goodspeed (born 1984/85), American economist

== In fiction ==
- Ethan Rom, alias of Dr. Ethan Goodspeed, a character in the US television series Lost
- Gary Goodspeed, the main character of the US animated television series Final Space
- Horace Goodspeed, a character in the US television series Lost
- Patience Goodspeed, the main character in The Voyage of Patience Goodspeed and The Education of Patience Goodspeed, by Heather Vogel Frederick
- Dr. Stanley Goodspeed, a character in the 1996 US film The Rock
