= Access Point Name =

Name of a gateway between a mobile network and another computer network

An Access Point Name (APN) is the name of a gateway between a mobile network (GSM, GPRS, 3G, 4G and 5G) and another computer network, frequently the public Internet.

A mobile device making a data connection must be configured with an APN to present to the carrier. The carrier will then examine this identifier to determine what type of network connection should be created, for example: which IP addresses should be assigned to the wireless device, which security methods should be used, and how, or if, the device should be connected to some private customer network. APN settings connect the device to the internet via mobile carrier’s cellular network. These settings include IP addresses, gateways, and other technical details that enable the device to access the internet and send MMS.

More specifically, the APN identifies the packet data network (PDN) that a mobile data user wants to communicate with. In addition to identifying a PDN, an Access Point Name may also be used to define the type of service(s), (e.g. connection to a Wireless Application Protocol (WAP) server and access to Multimedia Messaging Service (MMS)) that is provided by the packet data network. APN is used in 3GPP data access networks, e.g. General Packet Radio Service (GPRS) and evolved by packet core (EPC).

Typically, APN settings are configured automatically when SIM is inserted or eSIM is activated.

== APN terms ==
Below are some terms of the APN settings, explaining what each setting stands for:

APN
The APN address of your (mobile network operator) MNOs.
MMSC
The MMS message link.
Proxy
A proxy server’s address. Often, this area is left blank.
MCC (Mobile Country Code)
A three-digit code that is used for the country’s identity.
MNC (Mobile Network Code)
The mobile network operator is represented by a number code.

== Structure of an APN ==
$\underbrace{\text{network id}}_{\text{Network Identifier} } . \underbrace{\color{blue}\text{mnc}\langle\text{MNC}\rangle.\text{mcc}\langle\text{MCC}\rangle.\text{gprs} }_{\color{blue}\text{Operator Identifier} }$
Access Point Name structure

A structured APN consists of two parts as shown in the accompanying figure.

- Network Identifier: Defines the external network to which the Gateway GPRS Support Node (GGSN) is connected. Optionally, it may also include the service requested by the user. This part of the APN is mandatory
- Operator Identifier: Defines the specific operator's packet domain network in which the GGSN is located. This part of the APN is optional. The MCC is the mobile country code and the MNC is the mobile network code which together uniquely identify a mobile network operator.

Examples of APN are:

- three.co.uk (Note: This example APN uses a domain name from the DNS, three.co.uk, that belongs to the operator)
- internet.t-mobile
- internet.mnc012.mcc345.gprs
- rcomnet.mnc015.mcc405.gprs
- internet (Note: This APN example does not contain an operator)
- NXTGENPHONE (Note: Does not contain an operator, however in practice it is AT&T Mobility's LTE APN)
- VZWINTERNET (Note: No operator, but the APN name clearly identifies Verizon)
- mobitel (Note: APN name clearly identifies the operator SLTMobitel)
- jionet (Note: APN name clearly identifies the operator Jio)
- tethering.dish.com (Tethering service by Dish Network)

LTE networks use APN-FQDN format, which differs from the 2G/3G format described above as follows. "apn.epc." is inserted before "mnc⟨MNC⟩", and the ".gprs" at the end becomes ".3gppnetwork.org"

For example: the 2G/3G internet.mnc012.mcc345.gprs becomes internet.apn.epc.mnc012.mcc345.3gppnetwork.org .

== KPN Incident ==
In 2023, an incident was discovered where choosing the advancedinternet APN from the Dutch ISP KPN drained the battery of smartphones significantly faster. This APN was designed to give internet access without a firewall and with public IP addresses.
