= MiFi =

Brand name for a wireless router that acts as a mobile Wi-Fi hotspot

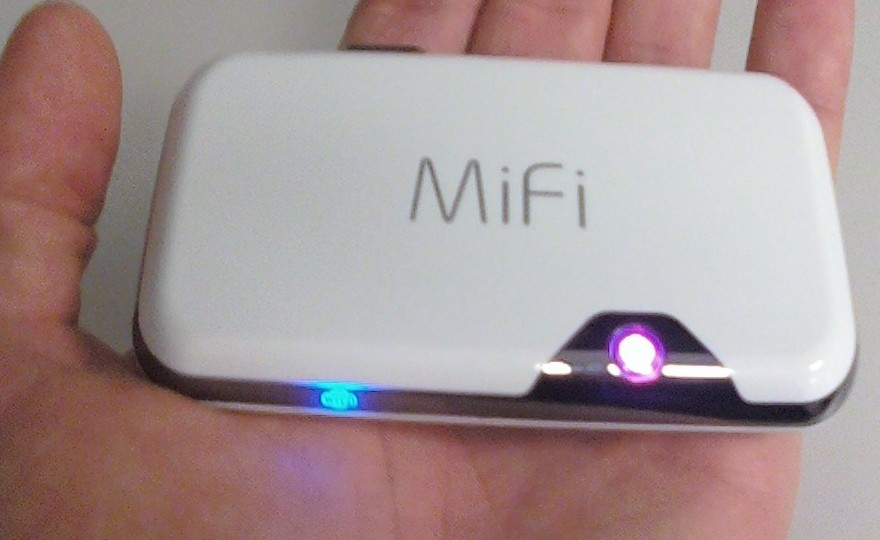
A Novatel MiFi 2372 "Intelligent Mobile Wi-Fi Hotspot"

MiFi is a brand name for wireless routers that act as mobile Wi-Fi hotspot devices. A MiFi device connects to a cellular network to provide wireless Internet access for up to fifteen other devices.

MiFi is a registered trademark in many countries.

== MiFi brand name ==
Novatel Wireless owns a registered trademark on the "MiFi" brand name in the U.S. (including Puerto Rico), and a number of countries worldwide: Bahrain, Canada, Egypt, Germany, Ghana, Hungary, Japan, Kuwait, Mexico, Pakistan, the Netherlands, New Zealand, Poland, Portugal, Qatar, Romania, Singapore, Slovenia, South Africa, Spain, and Thailand.

The notable exception is in the UK, where mobile operator 3 owns the "MiFi" trademark. In India the Mi-Fi trademark is owned by Mi-Fi Networks Private Limited.

== Devices ==
=== Novatel Wireless MiFi 2200 ===
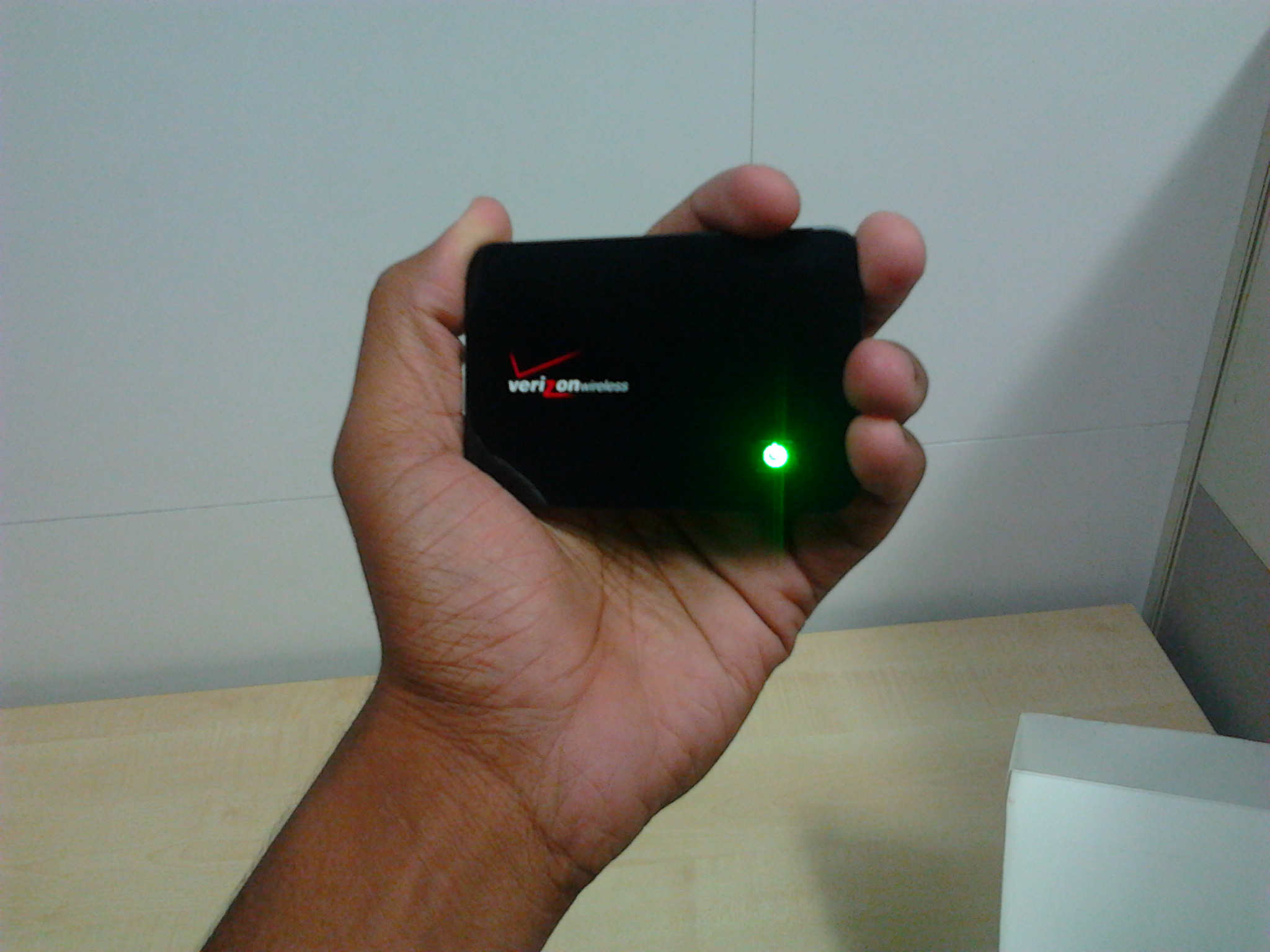
MiFi 2200 from Novatel Wireless for Verizon Wireless

- Limited to five Wi-Fi clients such as laptops, cameras, gaming devices, and multimedia players; with the exception of manually editing the device’s configuration file to allow more clients.
- May be connected to a computer via a micro-USB connection, though doing so disables the Wi-Fi networking, converting the device into a traditional single-client modem. (However, CNET described a tweak to charge the device over USB while maintaining its functionality.)
- Includes a GPS unit, which is usable on some networks like Virgin Mobile and not on others like Verizon.
- Uses 3G data network (CDMA 1xEVDO RevA).

=== Novatel Wireless MiFi 23xx series ===
Same functionality as 2200, plus:

- Accepts SD card for in-device shared media storage.
- Uses 3G data network (Mini 2352: SUPRA/PATHS 900/1900/2100 MHz, MiFi 2372: SUPRA/PATHS 850/1900/2100 MHz; both support GPRS/EDGE 850/900/1800/1900 MHz).

=== Novatel Wireless MiFi 33xx series ===
Same functionality as 23xx series, plus:

- Linux-based MiFi OS with widgets:
  - Messages: perform SMS-based messaging actions such as reading, writing, sending, and receiving SMS messages
  - Data usage: track MiFi data usage in home and roaming networks
  - GeoSearch: leverage the GPS functionality of the MiFi to display a map of the local area, search the local area, display the search results on the map
  - Weather: fetch weather data for the current and defined locations
  - MiFi DLNA Server: start, stop, and configure the MiFi DLNA server

=== 4G mobile hotspot devices ===
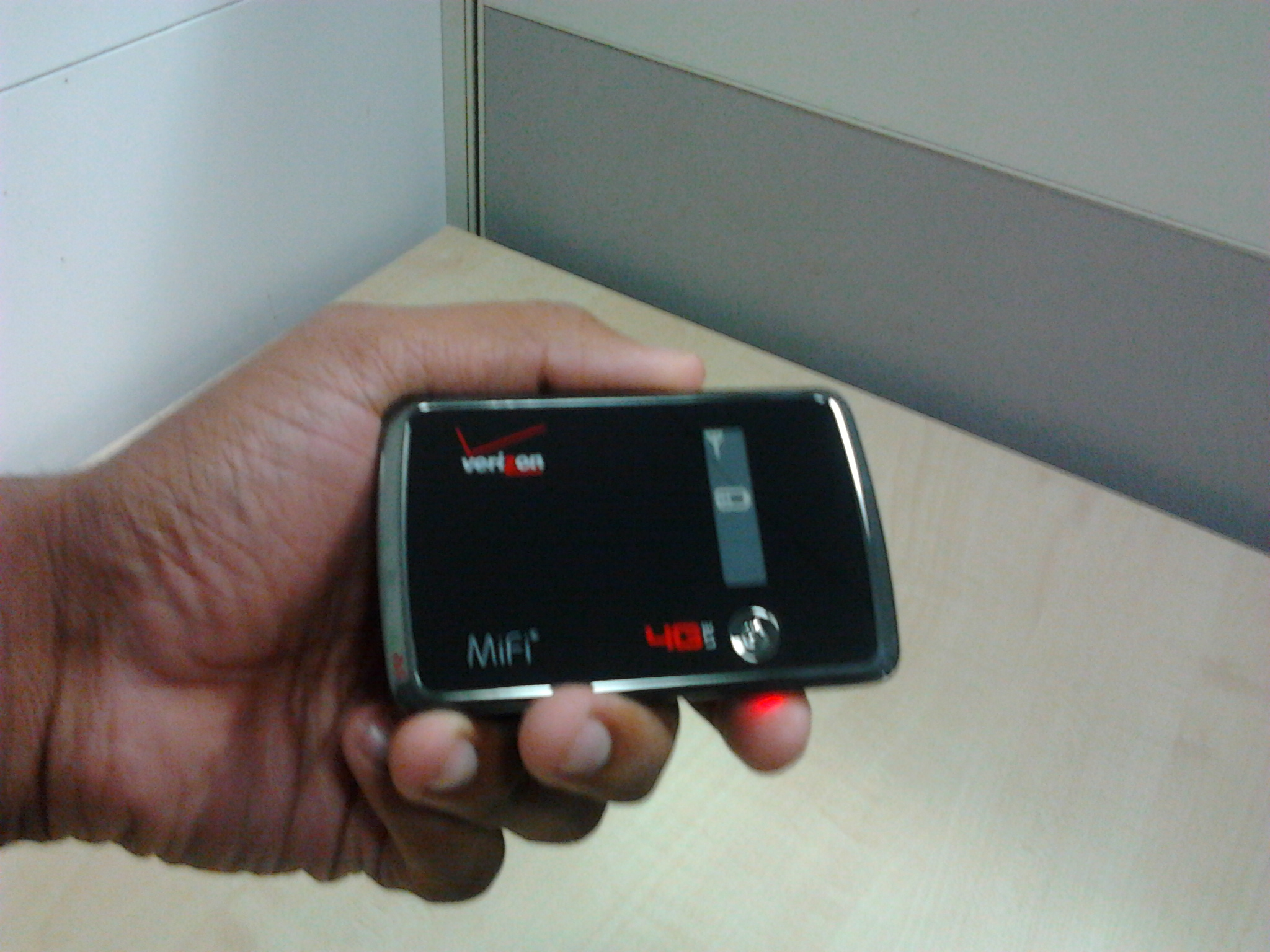
MiFi 4510L from Novatel Wireless for Verizon Wireless

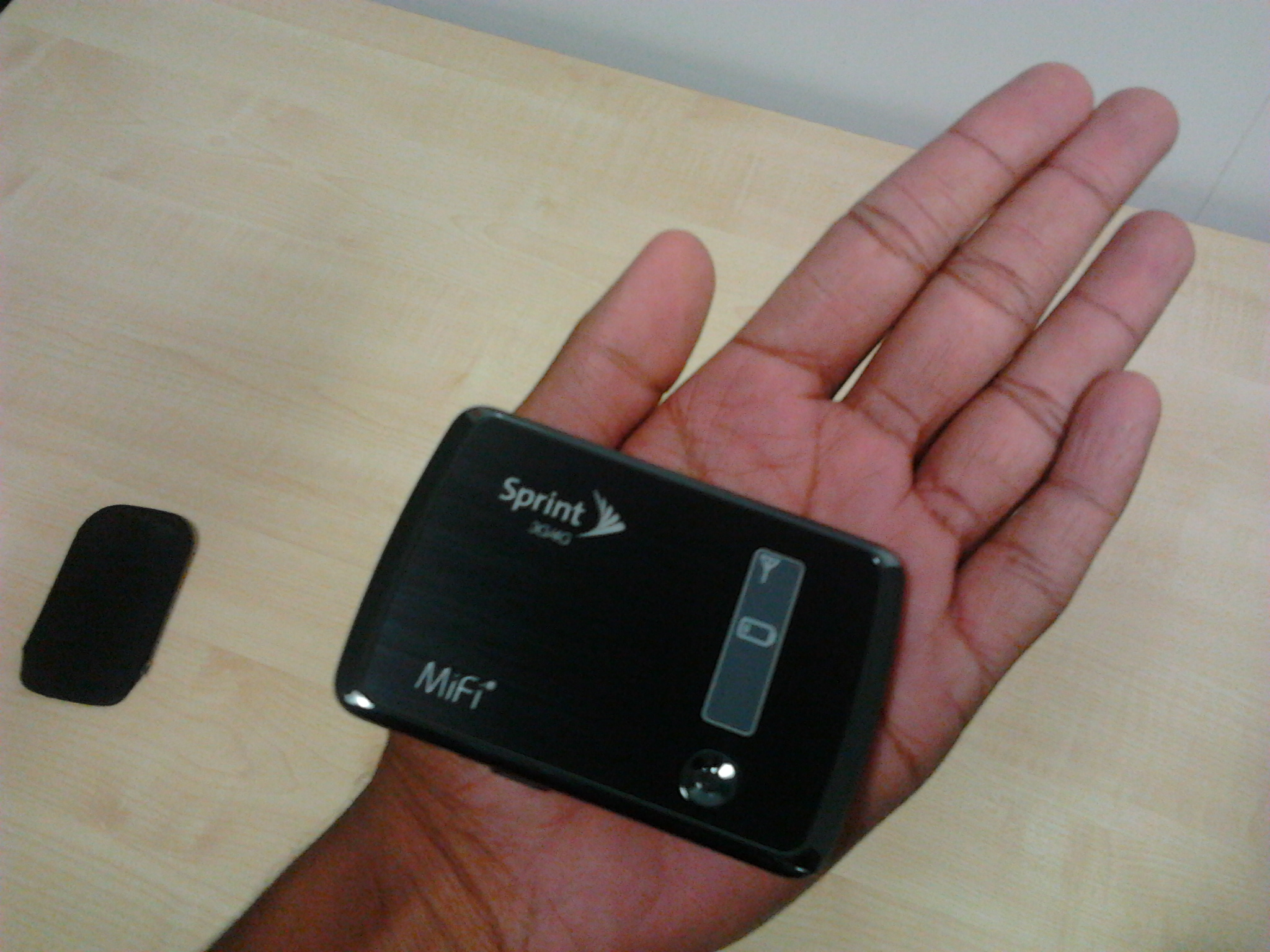
MiFi 4082 from Novatel Wireless for Sprint Nextel

The Las Vegas Consumer Electronics Show 2011 saw the introduction of two new 4G-capable MiFi devices from Novatel:

- Verizon Wireless featured the 4510L model, which will connect to Verizon's LTE 4G network, expected to support 5–12 Mbps download and 2–5 Mbps upload.
- Sprint featured the MiFi 4082, a WiMAX version.

Both devices maintain backward compatibility with existing 3G networks. Other features include:

- MiFiOS with widget support
- MicroSD card slot
- GPS receiver
- Four-hour battery life
- Front panel status display using E Ink technology. The front panel display shows battery, signal strength, and number of connected devices. The difficulty of viewing such information was seen as a major shortcoming of earlier MiFi devices.

=== 5G mobile hotspot devices ===
In November 2019, Vodafone Qatar and Inseego Corp. together launched the Gulf region’s first commercially available 5G mobile hotspot, 5G MiFi M1100.

- Connects up to 16 devices simultaneously (15 by Wi-Fi plus one by USB or Ethernet)
- Power optimization features Quick Charge technology and high-capacity battery

=== Non-Novatel wireless devices ===
A number of providers other than Novatel provide personal hotspot, "MiFi"-like services:

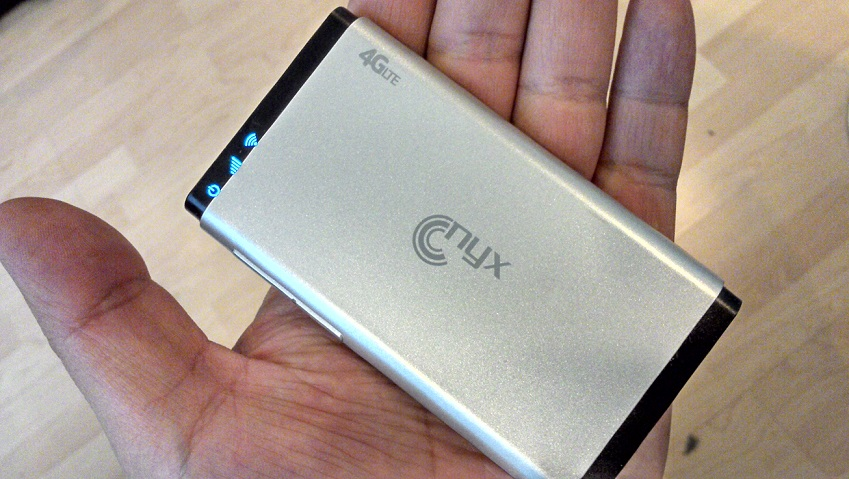
nyx mobile "mifi LTE" mobile router

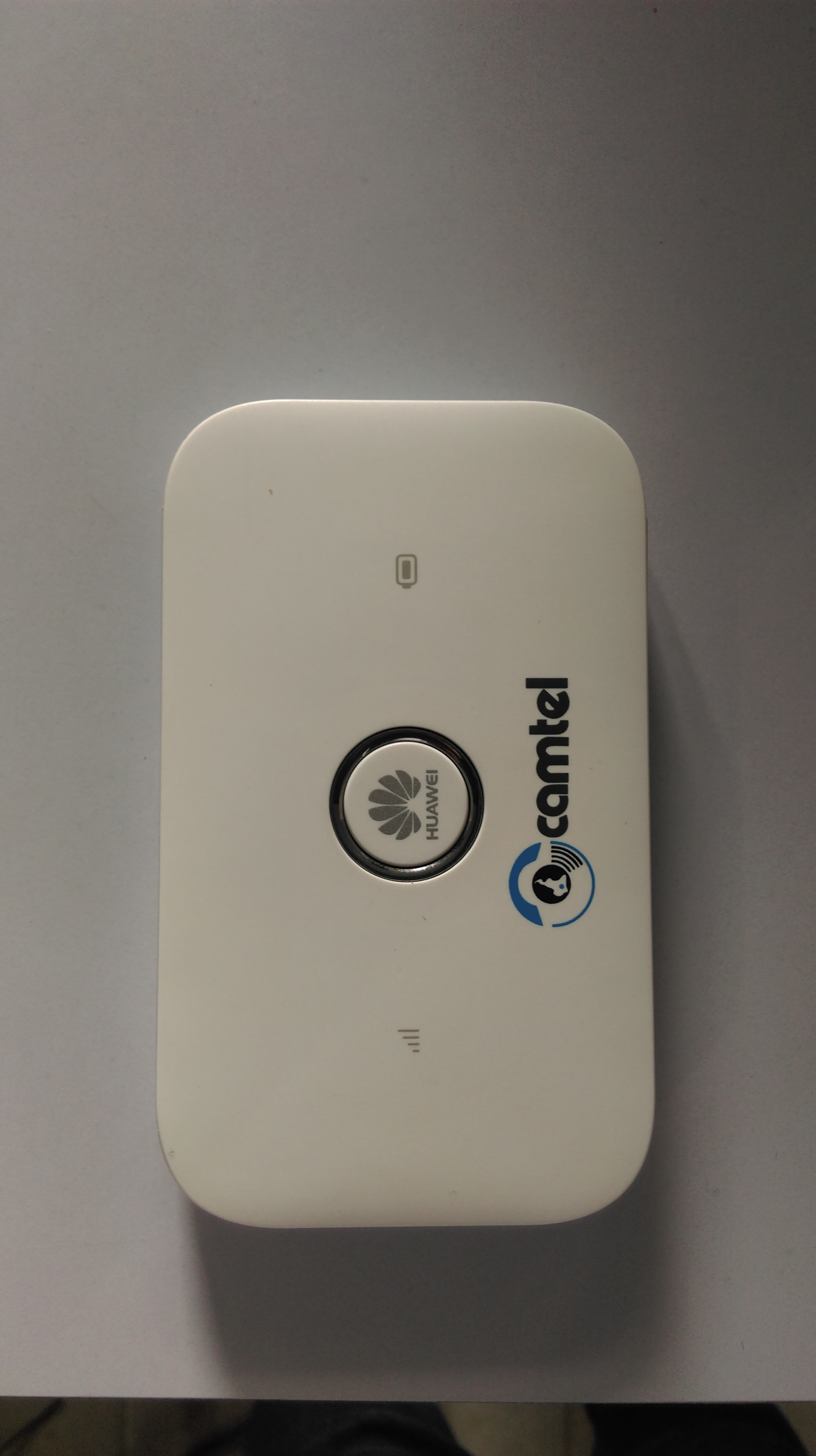
Huawei 4G MiFi for Camtel Cameroon

- Alcatel One Touch Link Y800 sold through EE in the UK
- Dongler DL9255 - supports GSM and WiFi-Bridging connectivity
- D-Link DIR-457/MyPocket
- Freedom Spot Personal Hotspot
- Goodspeed mobile hotspot supports 3G/3.5G
- Huawei E5 E5830 (Series), E585, E586 with HSPA+ and Chinese market E5805 using CDMA2000 and ET536 using TD-SCDMA
- MiFi LTE nyx mobile is a mobile router 3G + 4G (LTE) launched by nyx mobile for Telcel. It is built using Qualcomm technology and is expected to support up to 100 Mbps download. (Announced by June 2013 for Mexico
- Netgear AirCard 781S (Sold under the name Zing by Sprint)
- Option GlobeSurfer III
- Packet One Networks MF230 (offered as part of their P1 ToGo plan)
- Sierra Wireless Overdrive (Note: 4G capable; available only in the United States through Sprint)
- Tp-link M7450
- ZTE MF60, MF80
- JioFi is a mobile router 4G (LTE) launched in India.
- Horizon has MH50 a 4G/LTE Mobile Hotspot
- Horizon has MH500C a 5G Mobile Mi-Fi
- Inseego 5G MiFi M1000
- HT 5G Hub
- Netgear Nighthawk M2 Mobile Router
- Airtel 4G LTE "Pocket MiFi"

== Alternatives ==
Mobile phones with an Internet connection can often be turned into Wi-Fi hotspots using a process called "tethering", which is similar to using dedicated MiFi devices.

The following phone families have built-in features to create Wi-Fi access point:

- Android phones running Android 2.2 or later
- BlackBerry devices running OS 7.1 or later
- iPhone 3GS and iPhone 4 running iOS 4.3 or later, and all iPhones on Verizon Wireless (initially released with iOS 4.2.5)
- Palm Pixi Plus and Pre Plus on Verizon Wireless, with a 5GB cap
- Windows Phone devices running OS 7.5 or later (and if allowed by operator)

For other phones there are third-party applications to allow this:

- Android running Android 2.1 or under – Wireless Tether
- iPhone 3G and earlier – requires jailbreak.
- PiFi – Personal WiFi Device
- S60 phones and Nokia N900 – JoikuSpot
- Windows Mobile – WMWifiRouter

== Awards ==
- Novatel MiFi 2200:
  - Mobile Village "Mobile Star" (Portable Remote Connectivity Gear): "Superstar" Award (2009)
  - Laptop Magazine Editor's Choice (2009)
  - PC World "Gear of the Year" (2009)
  - Mobile News "Most Innovative Product (non-handset)" (2010)
- Novatel MiFi 2352:
  - Plus X Award in Technology (2009)
  - CTIA Emerging Technology Award (Fashion & Lifestyle Products), 1st Place (2009)
  - CTIA "Hot for the Holidays" (Mobile Internet Device or Netbook) Award (2009)
  - CES Innovations Award (Enabling Technologies) Winner (2010)
  - Mobile World Congress "Global Mobile" Award: Best Mobile Connected Device (2010)
- Novatel 4G MiFi
  - Consumer Electronics Show 2011, Notebook Accessories Category: Best in Show
  - 2010 World Communication Award (WCA) for Best Mobile Device Strategy
  - Mobile Village Mobile Star Award for Best Laptop or Tablet Accessory

== Security issues ==
In January 2010, two major security holes were discovered with the Novatel MiFi 2200 which, if properly exploited, could allow a malicious user to obtain the device's current GPS location and security keys. If the malicious user were physically close enough to use the device's Wi-Fi signal, this could give access to the MiFi's 3G connection as well as any other connected devices. Novatel responded that a security patch would be available in February 2010.

The popularity of MiFi devices can also be problematic for corporate network security. Corporations generally expect to control on-site Internet access: many use firewalls to reduce the risk of malware, and some enforce restrictions aimed at employee productivity. Personal mobile hotspots may provide a "back door" by which employees can circumvent these precautions.

== Recall information ==
In May 2010, the MiFi 2372 was recalled in Canada by Bell Mobility and Rogers Communications. In two documented cases, the difficulty of opening the MiFi battery compartment had caused customers to use levels of force that caused physical damage to the batteries, which then overheated. Novatel replaced the recalled units with ones that have an easier-to-open battery compartment.

== Radio interference at trade shows ==
At two major trade shows in 2010 — Google's first public demo of Google TV and the iPhone 4 demonstrations at the 2010 Apple Worldwide Developers Conference — keynote presentations using available Wi-Fi connectivity were disrupted by network unreliability. The problem was traced to massive radio interference, caused by the popularity of MiFi and similar devices for "liveblogging" from the trade show floor. Apple CEO Steve Jobs said that 570 different Wi-Fi networks ("several hundred" being MiFi's) had been operating simultaneously in the Apple exhibit hall.
