= Tethering =

Means of sharing Internet connections

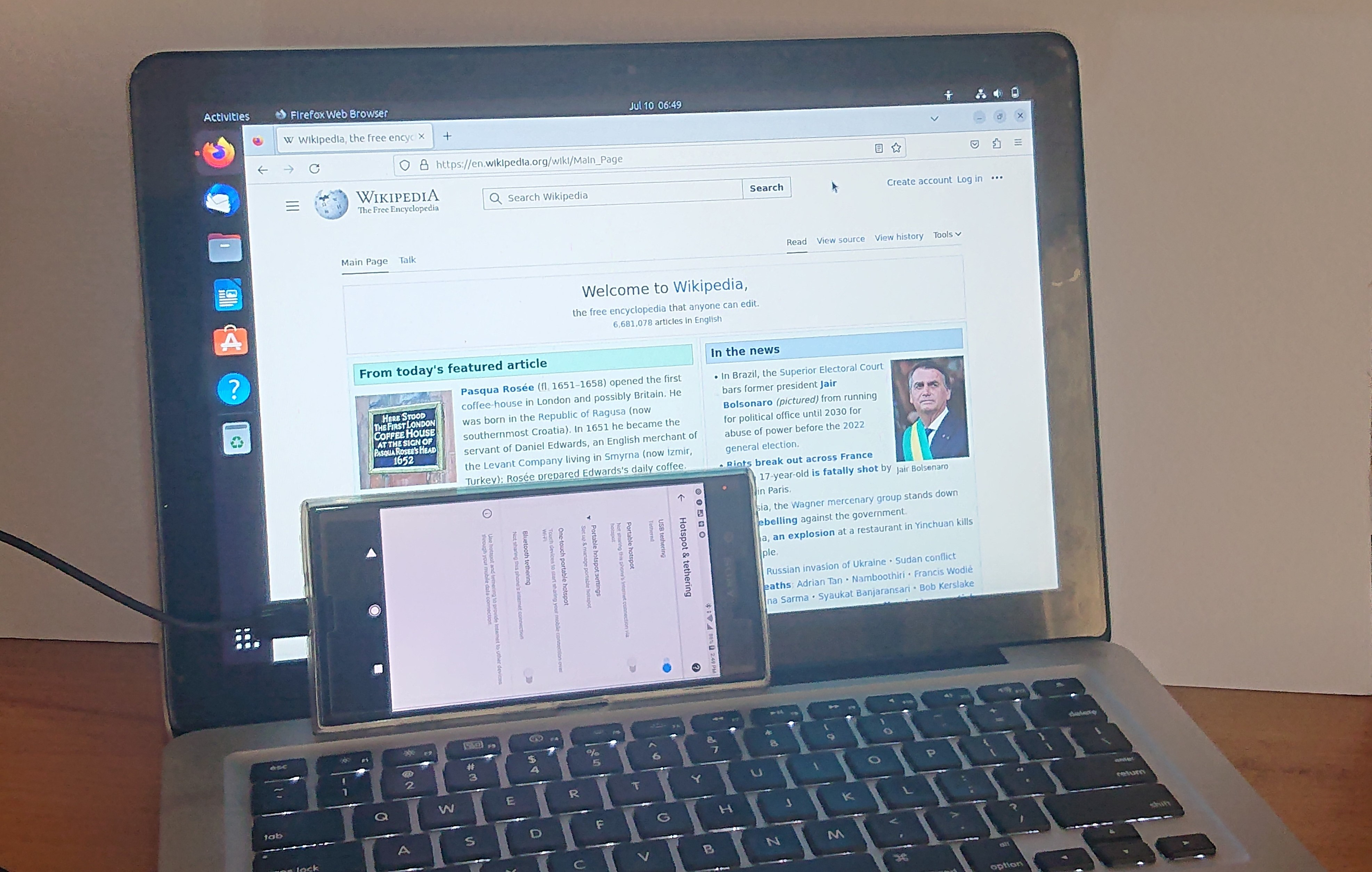
An Android smartphone tethered to a laptop with Ubuntu using USB

Tethering or phone-as-modem (PAM) is the sharing of a mobile device's cellular data connection with other connected computers. It effectively turns the transmitting device into a modem to allow others to use its cellular network as a gateway for Internet access. The sharing can be done wirelessly over wireless LAN (Wi-Fi), Bluetooth, IrDA or by physical connection using a cable like USB. If tethering is done over Wi-Fi, the feature may be branded as a personal hotspot or mobile hotspot, and the transmitting mobile device would also act as a portable wireless access point (AP) which may also be protected using a password. Tethering over Bluetooth may use the Personal Area Networking (PAN) profile between paired devices, or alternatively the Dial-Up Networking (DUN) profile where the receiving device virtually dials the cellular network APN, typically using the number *99#.

== Mobile devices' OS support ==
Many mobile devices are equipped with software to offer tethered Internet access. Windows Mobile 6.5, Windows Phone 7, Android (starting from version 2.2), and iOS 3.0 (or later) offer tethering over a Bluetooth PAN or a USB connection. Tethering over Wi-Fi, also known as Personal Hotspot, is available on iOS starting with iOS 4.2.5 (or later) on iPhone 4 or iPad (3rd gen), certain Windows Mobile 6.5 devices like the HTC HD2, Windows Phone 7, 8 and 8.1 devices (varies by manufacturer and model), and certain Android phones (varies widely depending on carrier, manufacturer, and software version).

For PCs, Windows added support for USB tethering devices since Windows 7.

For IPv4 networks, the tethering normally works via NAT on the handset's existing data connection, so from the network point of view, there is just one device with a single IPv4 network address, though it is technically possible to attempt to identify multiple machines.

On some mobile network operators, this feature is contractually unavailable by default, and may be activated only by paying to add a tethering package to a data plan or choosing a data plan that includes tethering. This is done primarily because with a computer sharing the network connection, there is typically substantially more network traffic.

Some network-provided devices have carrier-specific software that may deny the inbuilt tethering ability normally available on the device, or enable it only if the subscriber pays an additional fee. Some operators have asked Google or any mobile device producer using Android to completely remove tethering capability from the operating system on certain devices. Handsets purchased SIM-free, without a network provider subsidy, are often unhindered with regard to tethering.

There are, however, several ways to enable tethering on restricted devices without paying the carrier for it, including third-party USB tethering apps such as PDAnet, rooting Android devices or jailbreaking iOS devices and installing a tethering application on the device. Tethering is also available as a downloadable third-party application on most Symbian mobile phones as well as on the MeeGo platform and on WebOS mobiles phones.

== In carriers' contracts ==
Depending on the wireless carrier, a user's cellular device may have restricted functionality. While tethering may be allowed at no extra cost, some carriers impose a one-time charge to enable tethering and others forbid tethering or impose added data charges. Contracts that advertise "unlimited" data usage often have limits detailed in a fair usage policy.

=== United Kingdom ===
Since 2014, all pay-monthly plans from the Three network in the UK include a "personal hotspot" feature.

Earlier, two tethering-permitted mobile plans offered unlimited data: The Full Monty on T-Mobile, and The One Plan on Three. Three offered tethering as a standard feature until early 2012, retaining it on selected plans. T-Mobile dropped tethering on its unlimited data plans in late 2012.

=== United States ===
As cited in Sprint Nextel's "Terms of Service":

"Except with Phone-as-Modem plans, you may not use a phone (including a Bluetooth phone) as a modem in connection with a computer, PDA, or similar device. We reserve the right to deny or terminate service without notice for any misuse or any use that adversely affects network performance."

T-Mobile US has a similar clause in its "Terms & Conditions":

"Unless explicitly permitted by your Data Plan, other uses, including for example, using your Device as a modem or tethering your Device to a personal computer or other hardware, are not permitted."

T-Mobile's Simple Family or Simple Business plans offer "Hotspot" from devices that offer that function (such as Apple iPhone) to up to five devices. Since March 27, 2014, 1000 MB per month is free in the US with cellular service. The host device has unlimited slow internet for the rest of the month, and all month while roaming in 100 countries, but with no tethering. For US$10 or $20 per month more per host device, the amount of data available for tethering can be increased markedly. The host device cellular services can be canceled, added, or changed at any time; pro-rated, data tethering levels can be changed month-to-month; and T-Mobile no longer requires any long-term service contracts, allowing users to bring their own devices or buy devices from them, independent of whether they continue service with them.

As of 2013 Verizon Wireless and AT&T Mobility offer wired tethering to their plans for a fee, while Sprint Nextel offers a Wi-Fi connected "mobile hotspot" tethering feature at an added charge. However, actions by the Federal Communications Commission (FCC) and a small claims court in California may make it easier for consumers to tether. On July 31, 2012, the FCC released an unofficial announcement of Commission action, decreeing Verizon Wireless must pay $1.25 million to resolve the investigation regarding compliance of the C Block Spectrum (see US Wireless Spectrum Auction of 2008). The announcement also stated that "(Verizon) recently revised its service offerings such that consumers on usage-based pricing plans may tether, using any application, without paying an additional fee." After that judgement, Verizon released "Share Everything" plans that enable tethering, however users must drop old plans they were grandfathered under (such as the Unlimited Data plans) and switch, or pay a tethering fee.

In another instance, Judge Russell Nadel of the Ventura Superior Court awarded AT&T customer Matt Spaccarelli $850, despite the fact that Spaccarelli had violated his terms of service by jailbreaking his iPhone in order to fully utilize his iPhone's hardware. Spaccarelli demonstrated that AT&T had unfairly throttled his data connection. His data shows that AT&T had been throttling his connection after approximately 2 GB of data was used. Spaccarelli responded by creating a personal web page in order to provide information that allows others to file a similar lawsuit, commenting:

"Hopefully with all this concrete data and the courts on our side, AT&T will be forced to change something. Let's just hope it chooses to go the way of Sprint, not T-Mobile."

While T-Mobile did eventually allow tethering, on August 31, 2015, the company announced it will punish users who abuse its unlimited data by violating T-Mobile's rules on tethering (which unlike standard data does carry a 7 GB cap before throttling takes effect) by permanently kicking them off the unlimited plans and making users sign up for tiered data plans. T-Mobile mentioned that it was only a small handful of users who abused the tethering rules by using an Android app that masks T-Mobile's tethering monitoring and uses as much as 2 TBs per month, causing speed issues for most customers who do not abuse the rules.

=== Germany ===
Germany has three major cellular providers. The biggest provider, Deutsche Telekom, only states that "[...] cellular services are only provided when used together with a mobile cellular device". Moreover under point 11.5 of the cellular price list it is very much prohibited to make a private cellular connection commercially or publicly available. However, the price list of cellular contracts specifically states that using your own device as a modem or personal Hotspot for personal and private use is permitted.

The next biggest cellular provider, Vodafone, also states in their mobile price list that they don't allow making the personal connection publicly available. A personal hotspot and especially tethering is on all mentioned contracts allowed. For example, the "Vodafone Red 2016 S" with 2 GB up to the "Vodafone Young 2020 XL" with unlimited data encourage their users to share their data with another personal device

The third-largest provider, Telefonica O2, generally sells cheaper contracts than the larger providers. With their "o2 free unlimited contract", they explicitly stated that stationary non-battery-operated WiFi access points aren't allowed to be used the contract. Therefore, the German society of consumer rights sued Telefonica O2. This clause conflicts with net neutrality, which was confirmed by the European Court of Justice. Germany's highest justice court also confirmed the illegality of contract clauses that would forbid WiFi hotspots, tethering and in this case cellular routers.

== Wi-Fi sharing ==
"Wi-Fi sharing" or "Wi-Fi repeating" is a form of tethering through wireless LAN but with a separate use case similar to a wireless repeater/extender. It allows a compatible device to tether its active Wi-Fi connection, without the involvement of cellular networks. It can be useful for example when travelling with multiple devices and not needing to register every device on a public network. Samsung and LG have released smartphones with this ability starting with the Galaxy S7 and V20. It is called Wi-Fi sharing on Samsung Galaxy and One UI. Google have also added this feature for the first time on the Pixel 3.

Microsoft Windows computers also allow the sharing of an active Wi-Fi (or Ethernet) connection through tethering. See also Internet Connection Sharing (ICS).

== See also ==
- Internet Connection Sharing
- Mobile broadband
- Mobile Internet device (MID)
- Mobile modems and routers
- Open Garden
- Smartbook
- Smartphone
