= Rai Gulp =

- Final logo, used from 2017 to 2027
- Country: Italy
- Broadcast area: Italy and San Marino, reaching bordering regions via overspill of the Italian terrestrial network

Programming
- Language: Italian
- Picture format: 1080i HDTV (downscaled to 16:9 576i for the SDTV feed)

Ownership
- Owner: RAI
- Sister channels: Rai 1 Rai 2 Rai 3 Rai 4 Rai 5 Italiana; Rai Movie; Rai News 24; Rai Premium; Rai Sport; Rai Storia; Rai Yoyo; Rai Ladinia; Rai Südtirol; Rai Italia

History
- Launched: 1 June 2007; 19 years ago
- Replaced: Rai Doc; Rai Futura
- Closed: 1 January 2027; 39 days' time
- Replaced by: Rai Vibe

Links
- Website: raigulp.rai.it

Availability

Terrestrial
- Digital terrestrial television: Channel 42 (SD)

Streaming media
- RaiPlay: Live streaming

Rai Gulp is a soon-to-be-defunct Italian free-to-air television channel owned and operated by state-owned public broadcaster RAI. It is the company's television channel for older children and teenagers, and is known for its programming for children between the ages of eight and fourteen.

== History ==
Rai Gulp began broadcasting on 1 June 2007 as a replacement for Rai Doc and Rai Futura, the latter two were closed shortly before its launch.

Since RaiSat Smash Girls ended broadcasting in 2009, some programmes broadcast on that channel have been present in the channel's schedule.

From 27 April 2010, the programming of the channel has been coordinated by the Rai Ragazzi structure.

In the Autumn of 2010, the channel slightly changed their onscreen branding and idents (for example, promos and bumpers), and changed its target audience to the 8-14 age range. New cartoons, live-action TV series, and other shows were added.

Since 1 January 2011, the official continuity announcer of Rai Gulp is voice actor Emanuele Ruzza.

On 31 July 2014, the channel began broadcasting new episodes of the Italian-American animated series Winx Club, previously shown on Rai 2. However, starting from April 15, 2019, Rai Gulp only airs repeats of the show, with new episodes now being shown on its sister channel Rai Yoyo.

Since 13 December 2016, the channel has been broadcasting older cartoons with a 4:3 format in the 16:9 pillar-box panoramic format, as well as Rai Yoyo and all the other Rai digital terrestrial channels.

Since 4 January 2017, the channel has been available in high definition on Tivùsat.

On 10 April 2017, the channel renewed its logo and graphics at the same time as the other Rai channels.

On 14 April 2017, Luca Milano replaced Massimo Liofredi as head of Rai Gulp and Rai Yoyo.

From July 2020, Rai Gulp no longer has its own website, but its programmes are available for streaming on RaiPlay.

In December 2021, the SD version closed on Tivùsat. The HD version is now FTA.

On 3 July 2026, it was announced that Rai Gulp will be replaced by Rai Vibe, a channel aimed at Generation Alpha and set to have more digital presence, starting from January 2027.

Starting from September 15, 2026, the Rai Gulp HD logo in the top-left corner omits the word "HD"

== Rai Vibe ==
Rai Vibe
- Country: Italy
- Broadcast area: Italy and San Marino, reaching bordering regions via overspill of the Italian terrestrial network

Programming
- Language: Italian
- Picture format: HDTV 1080i

Ownership
- Owner: RAI

History
- Launched: 1 January 2027; 39 days' time
- Replaced: Rai Gulp

Rai Vibe is a upcoming Italian channel. It is a rebrand of Rai Gulp and is set to launch on January 2027.

== Logos ==
1 June 2007 – 15 June 2009

15 June 2009 – 18 May 2010

18 May 2010 – 10 April 2017

10 April 2017 – 1 January 2027
