= RaiSat =

Italian brand of television channels

RaiSat S.p.A.
- Industry: Television
- Founded: 1 September 1997; 29 years ago
- Defunct: 18 May 2010; 16 years ago
- Fate: Folded into RAI
- Products: Pay TV
- Parent: RAI (95%); RCS MediaGroup (5%)

RaiSat was a subsidiary of RAI created in 1997 to produce thematic TV channels for satellite television that are now available in IPTV and digital terrestrial television with various providers.

== History ==
Rai Sat was created as external company in 1997 to create the first satellite channels of public service.

In July 1999, with the transfer from Rai's staff that was employed towards thematic channels, the company began to produce the first pay satellite platform networks for Tele+, then reorganized under Sky.

In 2009, following the non-renewal of the contract with Sky (Platform for which RaiSat produced exclusively its channels) it was announced that the parent company was preparing to fold RaiSat.

Until 18 March 2010, the shareholders of RaiSat were Rai (with 95% shares) and RCS MediaGroup (with 5% shares), On that date, the proportion of shares owned by RCS (equivalent to three million €) was liquidated.

On 18 May 2010, RaiSat was folded into Rai.

== Television channels ==
=== The first free channels ===
Activities started under Rai's ownership with 4 channels in September–October 1997, followed by a fifth in 1999:

- Rai Sat 1 - Cultura e spettacolo
- Rai Sat 2 - Ragazzi
- Rai Sat 3 - Enciclopedia
- Rai Sat Nettuno (now Uninettuno Università TV)
- Rai Sport Satellite (1 February 1999)

On 29 July 1998, the channels were outsourced to RaiSat S.p.A.

=== Transformation into pay-TV ===
In 1999, Rai's satellite channels were encrypted and RaiSat 3 was changed to RaiSat Educational.

The other 2 channels became 7 and were available on D+ (later TELE+ DIGITALE):

- RaiSat Ragazzi–dedicated to children and teens
- RaiSat Gambero Rosso– dedicated to cooking
- RaiSat Cinema–dedicated to cinema
- RaiSat Album–dedicated to history and the memory of the past
- RaiSat Show–dedicated to the shows
- RaiSat Art–dedicated to artistic and cultural heritage
- RaiSat Fiction–dedicated to TV series

=== Sky era ===
In 2003, when Sky launched, Rai Sat reorganized its channels. Raisat Art, Raisat Fiction, Raisat Album and Raisat Show were sacrificed.

5 channels were included in the Mondo Sky package:

- Raisat Ragazzi
- Raisat Gambero Rosso
- Raisat Cinema World (former Raisat Cinema)
- Raisat Prem1um (merger of Raisat Album and Raisat Fiction)
- Raisat Extra (former Raisat Show)

On 1 November 2006, RaiSat Cinema World reverted to the old name RaiSat Cinema, and RaiSat Ragazzi and was divided into:

- RaiSat YOYO
- RaiSat Smash

On 1 January 2009, RaiSat Smash rebranded to RaiSat Smash Girls. RaiSat Smash Girls was an Italian television channel owned and operated by state-owned public broadcaster RAI – Radiotelevisione italiana. It was the RaiSat's television channel for older children and teenagers, and is known for its programming for children between the ages of eight and fourteen.

On 1 November 2006, RaiSat Ragazzi was split into two channels: RaiSat Smash (for teens) and RaiSat YOYO (for preschoolers). On 31 July 2009, RaiSat Smash Girls was closed down.

=== Return to free to air ===
Founded in 1997 as a division of RAI, RaiSat produced themed TV shows for satellite TV, which are currently offered by a number of providers on IPTV and digital terrestrial television.

A number of satellite stations operating under the RaiSat brand started as free-to-air in 1997 and were only available via Tele+'s satellite pay-TV service in 1999.

RaiSat carried on with its operations throughout the 2000s, even after switching from Tele+ to Sky Italia in 2003. But at the end of the decade, Rai decided not to extend its agreement with Sky, which resulted in RaiSat's final closure in 2010. Any RaiSat channels that were still active by this point, transitioned to become free to air on DTT and on Tivùsat.

On 31 July 2009, at the end of lengthy negotiations, Rai wasn't able to renew the contract with Sky for the transmission of RaiSat channels. The bouquet was thus forced to abandon the satellite platform for a fee and was brought resized on DTT and on the nascent Tivùsat satellite platform.

As a result, RaiSat Gambero Rosso was sold, while RaiSat Smash Girls was closed down.

The available channels spared down to 4 and they were no longer visible in the Sky bouquet, but on terrestrial television and the Tivùsat satellite platform as well as streaming on Rai.tv:

- RaiSat Extra
- RaiSat Prem1um
- RaiSat Cinema
- RaiSat YOYO

On 18 May 2010, Rai absorbed the company, and reorganized all channels by changing their name (with the removal of the word Sat) and directly overseeing the program schedules, as a result:

- RaiSat Extra was changed to Rai Extra.
- RaiSat Prem1um was changed to Rai Premium.
- RaiSat Cinema was changed to Rai Movie.
- RaiSat YOYO was changed to Rai Yoyo.

On 26 November 2010, Rai Extra was closed and replaced by Rai 5.
