= Rai 4 =

- Logo used since 2016
- Country: Italy
- Broadcast area: Italy and San Marino, reaching bordering regions via overspill of the Italian terrestrial network
- Headquarters: Rome, Italy

Programming
- Language: Italian
- Picture format: 1080i HDTV (downscaled to 16:9 576i for the SDTV feed)

Ownership
- Owner: RAI
- Sister channels: Rai 1 Rai 2 Rai 3 Rai 5 Rai Gulp; Italiana; Rai Movie; Rai News 24; Rai Premium; Rai Sport; Rai Storia; Rai Yoyo; Rai Ladinia; Rai Südtirol; Rai Italia

History
- Launched: 14 July 2008; 18 years ago
- Replaced: Rai Utile

Links
- Website: rai4.rai.it

Availability

Terrestrial
- Digital terrestrial television: Channel 21 (SD)

Streaming media
- Rai Play: Live streaming

Rai 4 (Rai Quattro) is an Italian free-to-air television channel owned and operated by state-owned public broadcaster RAI – Radiotelevisione italiana. Launched on 14 July 2008 with the film Elephant, Rai 4 targets youths with films, live-action TV series, and animated programming.

== History ==
Rai 4 was launched after a countdown, on 14 July 2008 at 21:00 CEST with the broadcast of the film Elephant. At first, it aired mostly cult TV series and films, in addition to the "home runs" of L'Isola dei Famosi and X Factor (both programs on Rai 2).

The management was entrusted to Carlo Freccero from the channel's launch date until 4 August 2013, followed by the interim of Luigi Gubitosi until mid-October.

Management of the channel was originally going to be handled by RaiSat, who also took care of RaiSat-branded package channels exclusively for Sky Italia. The company was originally to manage the channel for three years, but due to the decision to close the company on 27 April 2010, the management of Rai 4 passed directly from RaiSat to Rai instead.

Since 2012, Rai 4 has offered short news bulletins by the editorial staff of Rai News 24.

Since June 2012, a second audio channel has been active on which the original audio of many of the films and series broadcast by the channel is available.

On 17 October 2013, the Rai board of directors decided to merge the channel under the management of Rai Gold.

Since 2014, it has broadcast both semi-finals of the Eurovision Song Contest.

From 13 September 2015, Rai 4 became visible on the Sky Italia platform at position 104.

On 7 December 2015, Rai 4 launched a new afternoon slot dedicated to animated programming imported from Japan on Thursday nights, as part of a deal with the publishing company Dynit. Some of the programs broadcast as part of this strand included Sword Art Online, Steins;Gate and Fairy Tail, the latter of which was the first Japanese animated TV series to be purchased and dubbed directly by the channel.

As announced by Rai itself during the IV meeting with Tivùsat, Rai 4 started broadcasting in high definition on 22 January 2016 on channel 110 and on Sky Italia channel 104.

From 18 February 2016, the channel and the others belonging to the Rai Gold structure have been entrusted to Angelo Teodoli, former director of Rai 2.

That same year, the channel broadcast the opening concert of Euro 2016, with commentary by Filippo Solibello and Marco Ardemagni (former ESC commentators) and the 27 games of which Rai has the rights with commentary by Gialappa's band under the title Rai dire Europeans. As a result of its success, the trio commented on Italy's friendlies and qualifying matches for the 2018 FIFA World Cup under the title Rai dire Nazionale.

From 12 September 2016, Rai 4 changed their logo together with Rai 1, Rai 2, and Rai 3, and the channel's logo and branding changed colour from magenta to purple.

From 19 September 2016, the high-definition version launched on digital terrestrial, on the Mux 5.

The official continuity announcer of the network is Massimo Lodolo.

From 8 to 14 July 2018, on the occasion of the channel's 10th anniversary, a special ident was introduced, a contest was held in which birthday wishes could be made, and a new slogan was introduced: Ten years into the future. Furthermore, the hashtag # Rai4diecianni appears under the logo.

On 13 September 2018, following the non-renewal of the contract, the channel left the Sky Italia platform.

== Logos and identities ==
Rai 4's second and previous logo was used from 18 May 2010 to 11 September 2016.

Rai 4's third and current logo since 12 September 2016.

== Programming ==
A few programmes include:

- Battlestar Galactica
- Being Erica
- Beverly Hills, 90210
- Blossom
- Breaking Bad
- Charmed
- Doctor Who
- Dream On
- Elementary
- Eurovision Song Contest (Semi-finals)
- Hawaii Five-0
- Heroes
- Misfits
- NUMB3RS
- Once Upon a Time
- Primeval
- Private Practice
- Spider Riders
- Switched at Birth
- Two and a Half Men
- The Fresh Prince Of Bel-Air
- Underbelly

From 24 September 2009, Rai 4 added several animated series imported from Japan to its programming, mostly on Rai 1. These programs aired on Thursday nights, which usually consisted of two episodes of different series. They were also broadcast on both Saturday and Sunday mornings for the first few months, but from January 2010, they began to be broadcast only on Sundays. The morning slot was last used in the 2013/2014 season. Finally, in the summer, repeats of programs previously broadcast were mostly aired.

Starting on 7 December 2015, in addition to the Thursday evening slot, an afternoon slot was introduced and designed for the transmission of Fairy Tail, the first Japanese animated TV series purchased and dubbed directly by the channel. For the first few weeks, the network offered repeats of two series broadcast on Thursday night (Sword Art Online and Steins;Gate), with the aim of making these series known to the public, and then continuing, from 11 January 2016, with the broadcasting of Fairy Tail, with double episodes; the first being a repeat of the second episode broadcast the previous day, and the second being a new episode. Repeats of the latest episodes were mostly broadcast early in the morning and at night. However, from June 2016, Fairy Tail was moved to a nighttime slot, and on 4 August 2016, the series was dropped from the schedule after the broadcast of episode 149. This manoeuvre, combined with the failure to conform to the time slot on Thursday evening, marked the end of the programming of Japanese animated TV series on the channel.

Below is a list of Japanese animated TV series broadcast by Rai 4 from 2009 to 2016; all of these were purchased, dubbed, and distributed by home video distribution companies, which granted a broadcast license to the channel.

- Anohana: The Flower We Saw That Day
- Aria
- Attack of Titan
- Code Geass: Lelouch of the Rebellion
- Den-noh Coil
- Eureka Seven
- Ergo Proxy
- Fairy Tail (Purchased and dubbed directly by Rai 4)
- The Melancholy of Haruhi Suzumiya
- Love Com
- Puella Magi Madoka Magica
- Penguindrum
- Nana
- Noein: To Your Other Self
- Planetes
- Psycho-Pass
- Romeo × Juliet
- Gurren Lagann
- Soul Eater
- Special A
- Steins;Gate
- Sword Art Online
- Toradora!
- Tokyo Magnitude 8.0
- Welcome to the N.H.K.
