= Television in Italy =

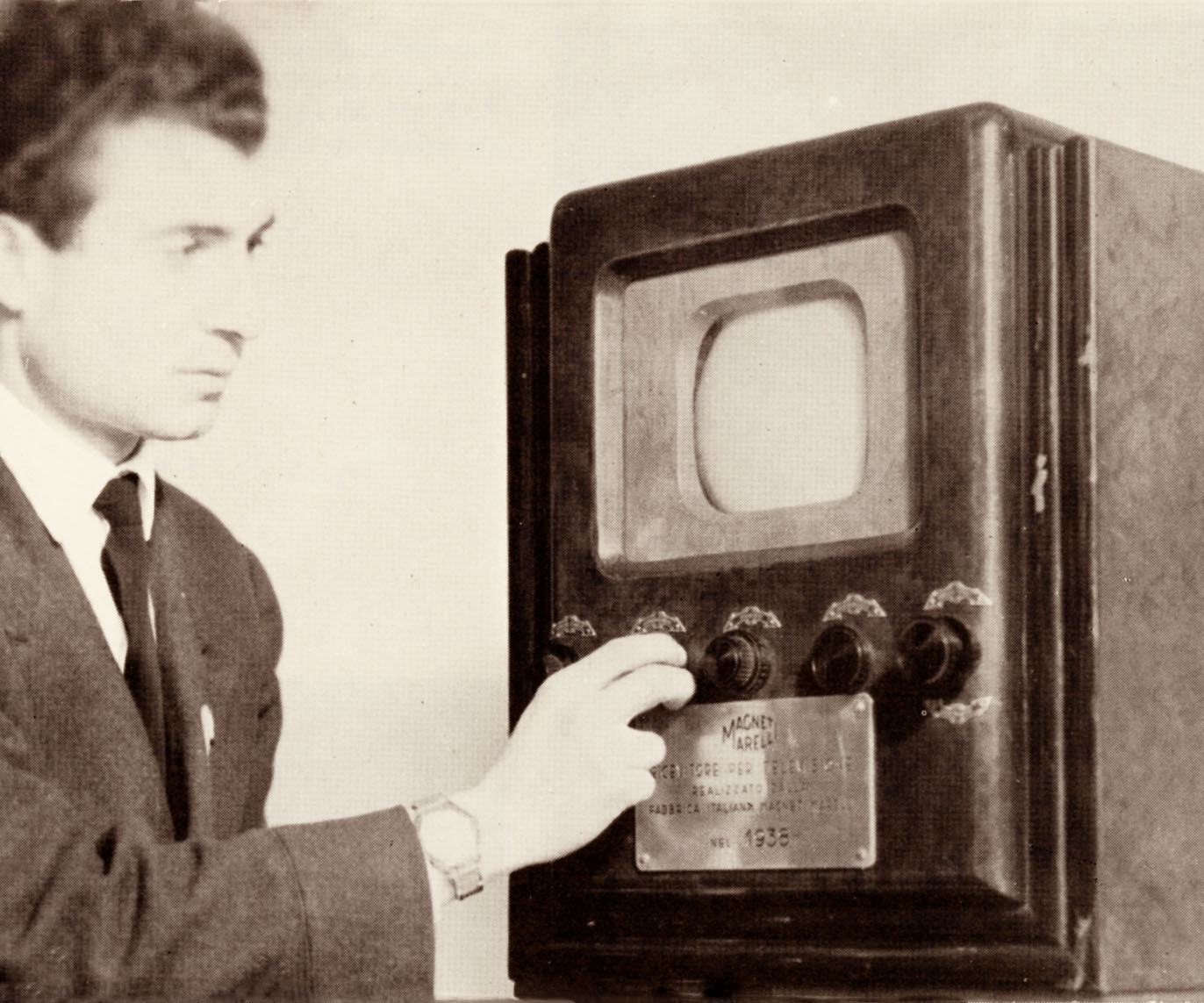
Magneti Marelli television from 1938

Television in Italy was introduced in 1939, when the first experimental broadcasts began. However, this lasted for a very short time: when fascist Italy entered World War II in 1940, all transmissions were interrupted, and were resumed in earnest only nine years after the end of the war, on January 3, 1954.

There are two main national television organisations responsible for most of the viewership: state-owned RAI, accounting for 37% of the total viewing figures in May 2014, and Mediaset, a commercial network which holds about 33%. The third largest player is the Italian branch of Warner Bros. Discovery, which has a viewing share of 5.8%, whereas the fourth largest player is Cairo Communication with a viewing share of 3.5%.

According to the BBC, the Italian television industry is widely considered both inside and outside the country to be overtly politicized. Unlike the BBC which is controlled by a board of governors regulated by Ofcom, the public broadcaster RAI is under direct control of the parliament. According to a December 2008 poll, only 24% of Italians trusted television news programmes, compared unfavourably to the British rate of 38%, making Italy one of only three examined countries where online sources are considered more reliable than television ones for information.

Terrestrial television has historically been the dominant form of transmission in the country.

== History ==
After some early tests in the 1930s, Italy experimented first regular electronic television transmissions from July 1939 to May 1940, through the state-owned EIAR.

After the war, the state-owned RAI was established and regular transmissions began on 3 January 1954. At the end of the 1970s, local private television networks began broadcasting, among which the ones from Silvio Berlusconi's Fininvest emerged in the 1980s, creating a holding that controls three major channels (Rete 4, Canale 5 and Italia 1), opposed still today to the three ones from the RAI itself.

Early television in Italy

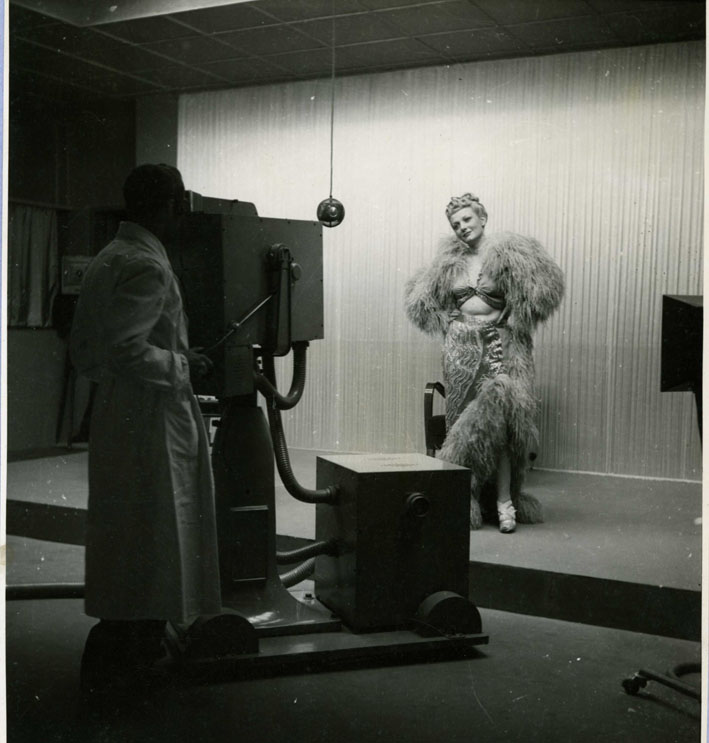
Early testing in 1933 from the italian company SAFAR.

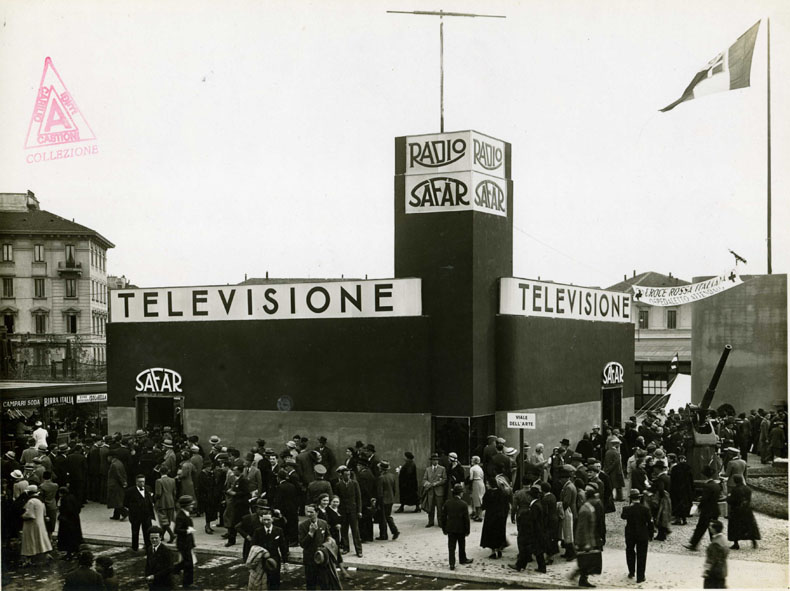
SAFAR standing at the Milan fair in 1933.

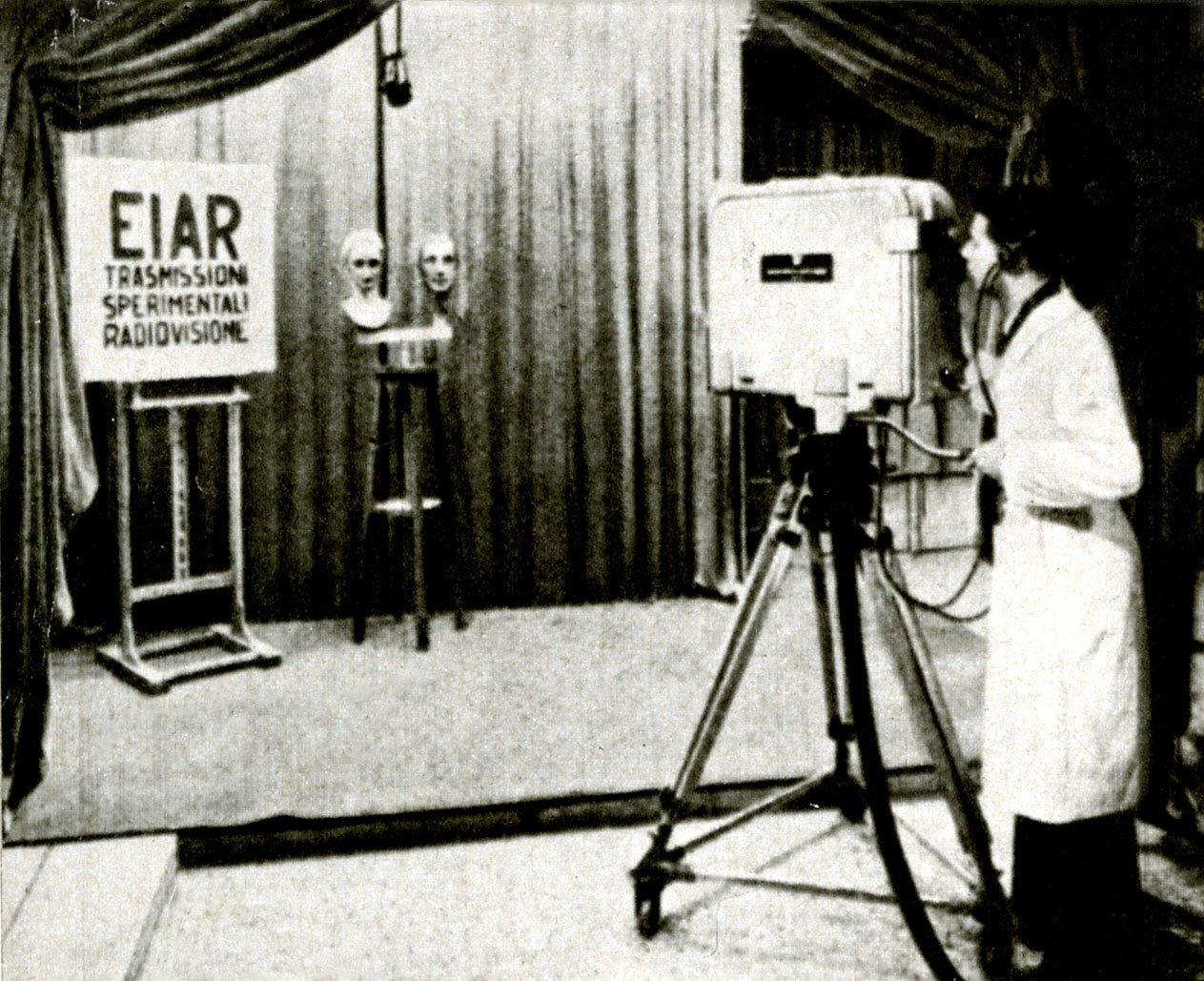
An early EIAR television studio in 1939.

== Television providers ==
=== Digital terrestrial television ===
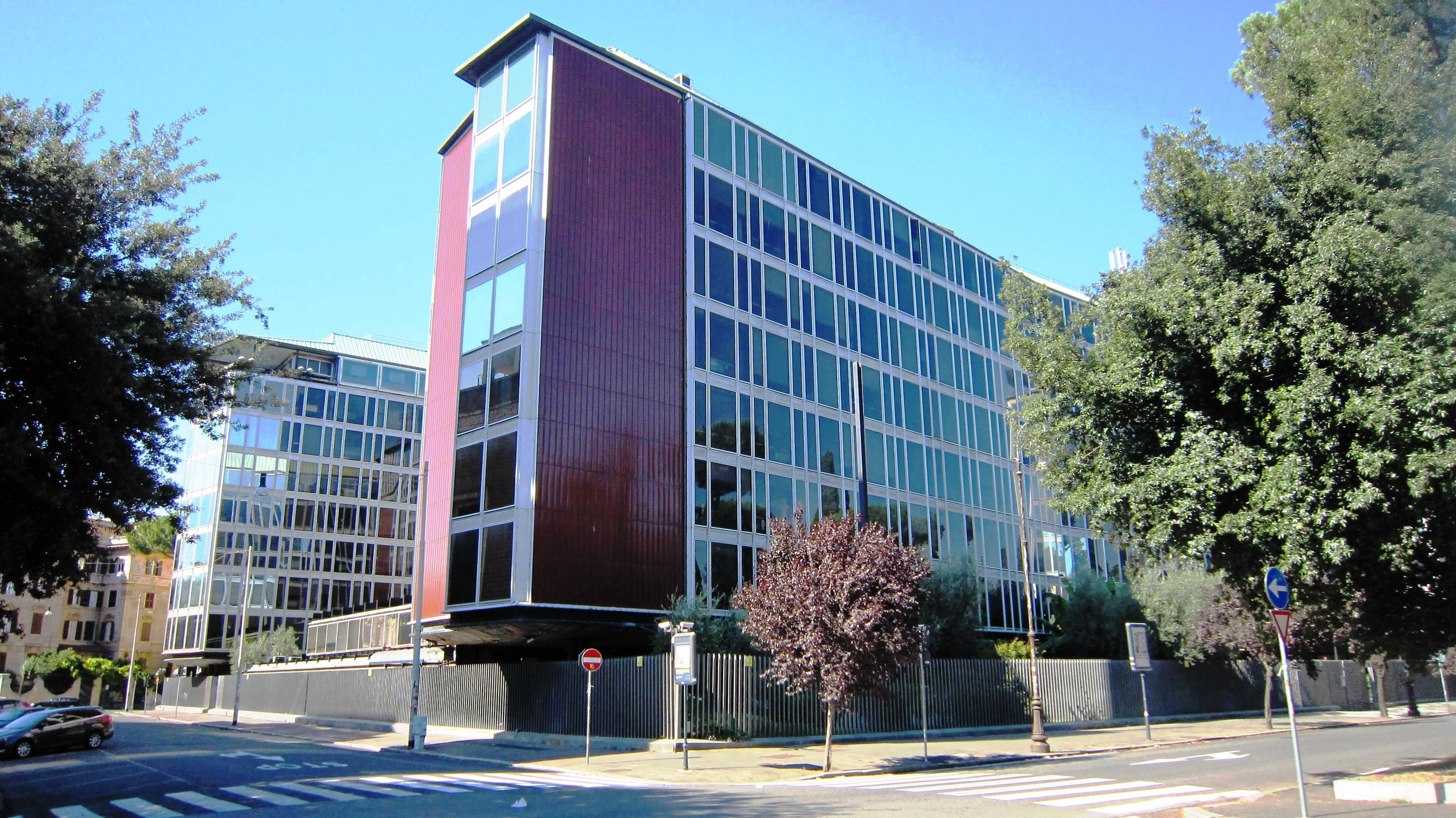
RAI headquarters in Rome

Digital terrestrial television technology has expanded rapidly and now every major network in Italy (including RAI and Mediaset) transmits in DVB-T format, while analog broadcasts were continued until the end of the transition, originally set by law to December 31, 2006, but later pushed back to the end of 2012.

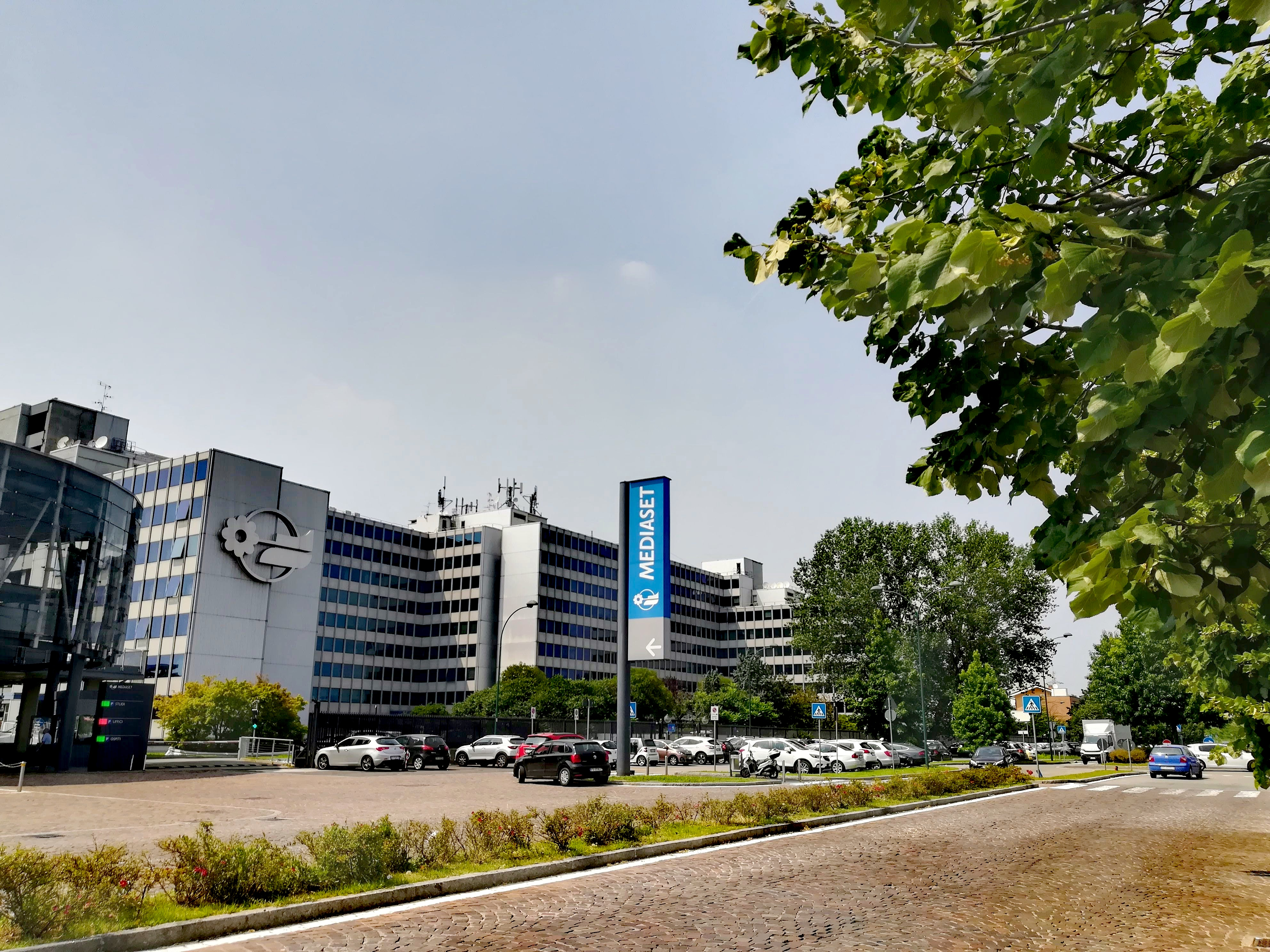
Mediaset headquarters in Cologno Monzese, near Milan

The Berlusconi II Cabinet started promoting the digital format in December 2003 by granting a public financial contribution for the purchase of a MHP digital television decoder. Starting from January 2005 Mediaset and Telecom Italia Media started offering pay TV services through a prepaid smartcard, including football games, movies and TV shows. In February 2006, during the 2006 Winter Olympics held in Turin, RAI experimentally broadcast a number of sport events using a 1080i signal and H264 coding. The HD signal has been transmitted over the Turin area, using DVB-T hierarchical modulation, and only specially crafted decoders have been able to receive this signal: they were placed in strategical points in the town.

During the UEFA Euro 2008 and the 2008 Summer Olympics, RAI started experimental high definition broadcasting on Rai Test HD, available only in Turin, Milan, Rome, Sardinia and Aosta Valley, continuing with the 2008 UCI Road World Championships and a few matches of the UEFA Champions League. In July 2008 the European Commission's directorate for competition expressed concerns on whether the actions taken by the current Italian government would be able to alter the current status of duopoly in the broadcasting market held by RAI and Mediaset. Beginning October 31, 2008, in the first region of Italy planned to interrupt analog transmission, Sardinia, television networks broadcast multiplexes only in digital format. Licence fee payers from the region were entitled to a 50 euros discount off the price of a digital television decoder or a new, digital-compatible TV set.

In April 2021, Byoblu began a national broadcaster and the first Italian TV network that was financially supported by private citizen's donations.

=== Satellite television ===
Italy has had digital satellite broadcasts since the 1990s, with the launch of Stream TV and TELE+. In 2003 these merged into Sky Italia, today this pay TV platform is broadcasting from Hot Bird satellites. HDTV regular services started in June 2006 under the name Sky HD, with the broadcasting of the 2006 FIFA World Cup in High Definition. As of today, almost all channels on the platform broadcasts in HD. Tivù Sat, a Free Satellite Service similar to the UK version Freesat, was launched in June 2009, ensuring access to national television channels from digital terrestrial television networks. Shareholders include Mediaset, Telecom Italia Media and the State-owned company Rai.

=== Pay television ===
==== Current providers ====
- Sky (Sky Group), with about 5 million households (transmission: DTH; IPTV; DTT)
- Now TV (Sky Group) (transmission: IPTV)
- Infinity+ (Mediaset) (transmission: IPTV)
- TIMvision (Telecom Italia), with almost 2 million households (transmission: IPTV)
- Discovery+ (Warner Bros. Discovery) (transmission: IPTV)
- Chili; pay-per-view only (transmission: IPTV)
- Netflix (Netflix, Inc.)
- Disney+ (Disney)
- Amazon Prime Video (Amazon)
- DAZN (DAZN Group)

==== Defunct providers ====
- Mediaset Premium (Mediaset) (transmission: DTT; IPTV)
- Europa 7 HD (Centro Europa 7 srl) (transmission: DTT)
- Dahlia TV (Airplus TV) (transmission: DTT)
- TV di Fastweb (Fastweb) (transmission: IPTV)
- Infostrada TV (Infostrada) (transmission: IPTV)
- Tiscali TV (Tiscali) (transmission: IPTV)
- Tele+ (Telepiù S.p.A.), with 1,8 million households in 2002 (transmission: DTH)
- Stream TV (Telecom Italia and News Corp) (transmission: DTH; Cable)

=== Cable television ===
In the 1960s the public television network RAI was a monopoly and the only network authorized to broadcast in Italy. Giuseppe Sacchi, a former RAI editor, launched on April 21, 1971, the first "free" television station, called Telebiella and based in Biella. It started to broadcast on April 6, 1972, devoted primarily to news and information. Immediately the government led by Giulio Andreotti forced Sacchi to dismantle Telebiella. Later a new law was issued to regulate and allow cable broadcasting, although with tight limitations: only one cable system for every city and only one TV channel for each system. Cable television remained undeveloped for many years, with the exception of a few amateur projects. In the 1990s, first Telecom Italia and then Fastweb created optical fiber networks and launched their IPTV offers (however associated with Sky Italia or Mediaset Premium subscriptions). IPTV was the only service to offer video on demand up until 2009.

== List of nationwide television stations ==
All channels broadcast 24 hours, and are in 16:9 format. On satellite, as a result of restrictions on broadcasting rights, most of RAI's channels are permanently encrypted, and broadcast free-to-view through the Tivúsat platform, or are temporarily encrypted when needed. However, Rai 1, 2, 3, Storia, Scuola and Gulp are left unencrypted. The channels from 10 to 19 are made available for Italian regional television.

=== RAI – Radiotelevisione italiana S.p.A. ===

Rai is Italy's national public broadcasting company, owned by the Ministry of Economy and Finance. Rai's broadcasts are also able to be received in neighboring countries, including Albania, Croatia, Malta, Monaco, Montenegro, San Marino, Slovenia, Vatican City, southern Switzerland, and across Europe on satellite. It is one of the 23 founding broadcasting organizations of the European Broadcasting Union.

Channel	Launched	Description
Rai 1	1954	generalist
Rai 2	1961	generalist
Rai 3	1979	generalist
Rai 4	2008	generalist, TV series, movies and entertainment for young audience
Rai 5	2010	cultured-oriented entertainment, documentaries
Rai Movie	1999	movies (HD on FTV satellite)
Rai Premium	2010	the best of RAI's past programs
Rai Gulp	2007	cartoons, TV series and entertainment programs for teens
Rai Yoyo	2006	cartoons and shows for pre-school children (HD on FTV satellite)
Rai News 24	1999	all news
Rai Storia	2009	documentaries focused on history
Rai Sport	1999	live sports and sports news
Italiana	2026	cultural and cuisine
Rai Radio 2 Visual	2020	radio broadcast and news

=== Mediaset S.p.A. ===
Mediaset is the largest commercial broadcaster in Italy. The group competes primarily against the public broadcaster and market leader RAI. Due to their proximity to (or encirclement by) Italy, Albania, Croatia, Switzerland, Malta, San Marino, the Vatican City and Slovenia can also receive Mediaset broadcasts. In addition to their domestic television channels, Mediaset also operates a series of news, entertainment and sport websites; owns 50.1% of the Spanish broadcasting firm Mediaset España Comunicación; owns the film production company Medusa Film; and heads a consortium which owns the television production house Banijay.

Channel	Launched	Description
Rete 4	1982	generalist
Canale 5	1980	generalist
Italia 1	1982	generalist
20	2018	generalist, oriented to movies, TV series and sport events (HD on Sky Italia and TivùSat)
Iris	2007	TV series, movies and cultured-oriented programs
27 Twentyseven	2022	TV series and movies (HD on Sky Italia and TivùSat)
La5	2010	TV series, movies, entertainment, reality shows, female-oriented channel
Cine34	2020	Italian movies of all time
Focus	2018	documentaries (It was owned by Discovery Italia)
Top Crime	2013	TV series and movies on the world of crime
Italia 2	2011	TV series, movies, entertainment, reality shows, male-oriented channel
TgCom24	2011	all news
Mediaset Extra	2010	past and current cult shows from Mediaset channels
Radio 105 TV	2019	radio broadcast and news
R101 TV	2014	radio broadcast and news
Virgin Radio TV	2018	radio broadcast and news
Radio Monte Carlo TV	2020	only on FTV satellite

=== Cairo Communication S.p.A. ===
Channel	Launched	Description
La7	2001	generalist
La7 Cinema	2025	movies

=== Discovery Italia S.r.l. ===
Channel	Launched	Description
Nove	2016	generalist
Real Time	2005	lifestyle (HD on Tivùsat)
Food Network	2017	cuisine (HD on TivùSat)
Discovery	1997	documentaries (HD on TivùSat)
Giallo	2012	TV series and crime movies (HD on TivùSat)
DMAX	2011	factual-entertainment for the male audience (HD on TivùSat)
HGTV - Home & Garden TV	2020	home improvement and real estate (HD on TivùSat)
Discovery Turbo	2018	motor (HD on TivùSat)

=== Sky Italia S.r.l. ===
Channel	Launched	Description
TV8	2016	generalist (HD on Sky Italia and TivùSat)
Cielo	2009	shows and movies (HD on Sky Italia and TivùSat)
Sky TG24	2003	all-news channel

=== De Agostini S.p.A. ===
Channel	Launched	Description
Super!	2010	cartoons, TV series and entertainment programs for teens

=== Boing S.p.A. (51% Mediaset, 49% Skydance) ===
Channel	Launched	Description
Boing	2004	cartoons, TV series and entertainment programs for pre-teens and teens
K2	2009	cartoons, TV series and entertainment programs for pre-teens
Boing Plus	2019	timeshift version of Boing and Cartoonito
Frisbee	2010	cartoons, TV series and entertainment programs for kids
Cartoonito	2011	cartoons, TV series and entertainment programs for kids aged 3–7.

=== Television Broadcasting System S.r.l. ===
Channel	Launched	Description
Retecapri	1982	generalist

=== Alma Media S.p.A. ===
Channel	Launched	Description
Alma TV	2020	entertainment focused on food, cooking, house living and travel and

=== GEDI Gruppo Editoriale S.p.A. ===
Channel	Launched	Description
Deejay TV	2018	radio broadcast and news

=== RTL 102.5 HIT RADIO S.r.l ===
Channel	Launched	Description
RTL 102.5 TV	2000	radio broadcast and news
Radiofreccia	2016	rock music
Radio Zeta	2016	Italian pop and indie music

=== Liberty Interactive ===
Channel	Launched	Description
QVC	2010	shopping and entertainment channel (HD on Sky Italia and TivùSat)

=== GM Comunicazione S.r.l. ===
Channel	Launched	Description
HSE24	2018	shopping and entertainment channel

=== Il Sole 24 ORE S.p.A. ===
Channel	Launched	Description
IlSole24Ore TV	2025	radio broadcast and all-news channel

=== Other national channels ===
Semigeneralist

- TV2000, religious channel

Music

- Radio Italia TV

Sports

- SuperTennis
- Sportitalia

Other

- Padre Pio TV, religious channel

=== Network of local televisions ===
- 7 Gold: launched in 1999 as "Italia 7 Gold", changed name in 2003; airs movies, sport debates and old TV series

=== Foreign channels ===
- France: France 24
- San Marino: San Marino RTV
- Vatican City: Vatican Media

=== Lower channels, teleshopping channel, lower network and local channels ===
- Canale 63
- Canale 65
- ibox.it
- Capri Store, home shopping
- Canale Italia: launched in 1976 as "Serenissima TV", changed name in 2004; airs entertainment shows, music and dance programmes (with the channel Canale Italia Musica), home shopping shows and classical movies. Also available on digital satellite and digital terrestrial
- Odeon: launched in 1987 from some local television stations that were previously affiliated to "Euro TV". The group also includes the channels TLC Telecampione launched in 1982 and TeleReporter launched in 1977 as "Tele Radio Reporter", "Telereporter-Canale 7" between 2002 and 2004
- Telepace: launched in 1977 as a radio and, two years later, as a syndication, it is a religious channel and airs direct-to-videos holy masses, holy celebrations and Christian holidays, it is visible only in some regions and it broadcast from near Verona
- Televisione Cristiana in Italia: launched in 1979, it is a religious channel too and it was named previously TBNE (Trinity Broadcasting Network Europe), this channel is visible only in some regions too

=== Digital satellite only (free to air) ===
Educational

- UniNettuno University TV

Lifestyle

- LUXE.TV
- TV Moda
- Wedding TV

News and politics

- Camera dei Deputati
- Justice TV
- Senato della Repubblica

Sports and betting

- HorseTV
- Passione Pesca
- Subacquea TV

=== Foreign channels ===
- China: CGTN
- France: Euronews, France 24, France 24 English, TV5Monde
- Germany: Deutsche Welle
- Iran: Press TV
- Japan: NHK
- Qatar: Al Jazeera, Al Jazeera English
- Russia: RT
- San Marino: San Marino RTV
- Slovenia: TV Koper-Capodistria
- Spain: 24 Horas, TVE Internacional
- United Kingdom: BBC News
- United States: Bloomberg Television, CNN International

== Former channels ==
- Telemontecarlo (1974–01, broadcasting from Principality of Monaco up to 1999)
- Rete A (1983–2005)
- Videomusic/TMC2 (1984–2000)
- Rete Mia (1988–2000)
- Italia 7 (1987–99)
- Pop (2017–19)
- Cine Sony (2017–19)
- Alpha (2017–19)
- Spike (2017–22)
- Alice (1999–20)
- Marcopolo (1997–20)
- Paramount Network (2016–22)
- Case Design Stili (2017–20)
- Pop Economy (2018–20)
- Mediaset Extra 2 (2019–20)
- VH1 (2016–24)
- LA7d (2010-25)

== Most viewed channels ==
The Auditel measures television ratings in Italy. The two most watched channels are still Rai 1 and Canale 5 which together share 33% of the audience. Following these in terms of ratings are Rai 3 and Rai 2 with 14% of total share and finally a third group of stations made up of Italia 1 and Rete 4 which together reach 12% of TV ratings. Apart from the seventh ex analogue television La7 with a market share of 4%. All the six RAI and Mediaset generalist channels had a slightly lower daily audience in 2013 compared with previous years, while Comcast's pay TV platform called Sky Italia (with its channels like Fox, Fox Crime, Sky Cinema and Sky Sport), nationwide channel La7 owned by Cairo Communication and several new free-to-air digital stations (like Giallo, Rai 4, Iris, La5, Real Time, K2, Rai Premium, Top Crime, Cielo, DMAX) are increasing in ratings day by day.

Position	Channel	Launch date	Owner	2008	2009	2010	2011	2012	2013	2014	2015	2016	2017
1	Rai 1	1954	RAI	22.86	22.99	22.33	21.80	20.63	19.86	18.1	18.3	17.84	17.43
2	Canale 5	1980	Mediaset	21.82	20.96	20.67	20.33	20.50	18.78	17.0	15.9	14.95	15.37
3	Rai 3	1979	RAI	9.11	9.31	9.06	9.07	8.46	7.75	8.5	7.7	7.38	6.73
4	Rai 2	1961	RAI	11.29	11.27	10.38	10.60	8.90	9.02	8.3	7.6	6.77	6.62
5	Italia 1	1982	Mediaset	11.48	11.09	11.18	10.83	10.68	9.22	8.3	6.18	6.54	5.97
6	Rete 4	1982	Mediaset	8.63	8.22	8.68	8.28	7.47	6.79	6.7	5.42	5.03	4.89
7	La7	2001	Cairo Communication	2.71	3.02	2.97	3.08	3.18	3.06	3.82	3.68	3.76	3.26
8	Real Time	2005	Discovery Italia	<0.90	<0.90	<0.90	<0.90	<0.90	<0.90	1.09	1.4	1.53	1.52
9	DMAX	2011	Discovery Italia	-	-	-	N.E.	N.E.	N.E.	<0.90	<0.90	1.32	1.40
10	Rai Yoyo	2006	RAI	N.E.	<0.90	<0.90	<0.90	<0.90	<0.90	<0.90	<0.90	1.34	1.38
11	Iris	2007	Mediaset	N.E.	N.E.	<0.90	<0.90	<0.90	<0.90	<0.90	1.26	1.31	1.31
12	Cielo	2009	Sky Italia	-	N.E.	N.E.	N.E.	<0.90	<0.90	<0.90	<0.90	<0.90	1.30
13	Top Crime	2013	Mediaset	-	-	-	-	-	N.E.	N.E.	N.E.	1.05	1.06
14	Rai Premium	2003	RAI	<0.90	<0.90	<0.90	<0.90	<0.90	<0.90	<0.90	1.25	1.14	1.06
15	Rai Movie	1999	RAI	<0.90	<0.90	<0.90	<0.90	<0.90	<0.90	<0.90	0.92	0.95	1.03
16	Boing	2004	Mediaset; Skydance	<0.90	<0.90	<0.90	<0.90	<0.90	<0.90	1.05	0.99	<0.90	0.99
17	Rai 4	2008	RAI	N.E.	N.E.	N.E.	<0.90	<0.90	<0.90	0.98	1.1	0.96	0.92

== See also ==
- List of television channels in Italy
- List of Italian-language television channels
- Television licensing in Italy
- Media of Italy
- List of newspapers in Italy
- List of magazines in Italy
- List of radio stations in Italy
- History of Italian journalism
- Censorship in Italy
- Telecommunications in Italy
- Internet in Italy

== Bibliography ==
- Grasso, Aldo (2008). Enciclopedia della televisione (in Italian) (3 ed.). Milano: Garzanti. p. 965. ISBN 978-88-11-50526-6.
