= Rai 1 =

Italian public television network

- Logo used since 2016
- Country: Italy
- Broadcast area: Italy and San Marino, reaching bordering regions via overspill of the Italian terrestrial network
- Headquarters: Rome, Italy

Programming
- Language: Italian
- Picture format: 1080i HDTV

Ownership
- Owner: RAI
- Sister channels: Rai 2 Rai 3 Rai 4 Rai 5 Rai Gulp; Italiana; Rai Movie; Rai News 24; Rai Premium; Rai Scuola; Rai Sport; Rai Storia; Rai Yoyo; Rai Ladinia; Rai Südtirol; Rai Italia

History
- Launched: 3 January 1954; 72 years ago
- Former names: Programma Nazionale (1953–1975); Rete 1 (1975–1983); Rai Uno (1983–2010)

Links
- Website: rai.it/rai1

Availability

Terrestrial
- Digital terrestrial television: Channel 1 (HD); Channel 501 (HbbTV)

Streaming media
- RaiPlay: Live streaming (only in Italy)

Rai 1 (Rai Uno, Italian: [ˈrai ˈuːno]) is an Italian free-to-air television channel owned and operated by state-owned public broadcaster RAI – Radiotelevisione italiana. It is the company's flagship television channel and is known for broadcasting mainstream and generalist programming, usually aimed towards families, including TG1 news bulletins, prime time drama, cinema and entertainment, and major breaking news, sports and special events. it is available in Digital Terrestrial Television, Tivùsat and Sky Italia.

It was launched on 3 January 1954 as the first regular television service in Italy. It was the only one until 4 November 1961, when RAI launched a second channel. The channel was initially referred to as "Programma Nazionale". It received other names, such as "Rete 1" and "Raiuno" until it adopted its current name "Rai 1". It has the highest viewership in Italy and regularly competes with Mediaset's Canale 5.

In Europe, it is available in free-to-air satellite broadcast from Hot Bird 13B. Since Sky Italia receives the signal directly from its satellite, the Rai channels are subject to content restrictions, as the same satellite signal is used to cover all of Europe. In September 2020, the Rai and Mediaset channels on Sky started airing commercials for Tivùsat during encrypted programming.

== History ==
=== Early years ===
The first television channel receivable in Italy started its experimental broadcasts in 1934. After the interruption caused by the Second World War, it was reinstated in 1949 from Triennale di Milano and for its presentation, Corrado Mantoni was selected, already noted for his radio work and especially for the announcement of the end of the conflict. Its regular broadcasts started at 11am on Sunday, January 3, 1954. Initially, the channel had no official name, because it was directly identified as Rai TV, which was the name of the company.

La Rai − Radiotelevisione Italiana inizia oggi il suo regolare servizio di trasmissioni televisive.

Rai – Italian Radiotelevision starts its regular television broadcasting service today.

— Fulvia Colombo announcing the start of TV broadcasting, 3 January 1954

The first set of programming for Rai 1 was almost completely educational with no advertising, except for the popular Carosello. Early shows were meant to teach a common language to a country torn apart by World War II. Shows like Non è mai troppo tardi... were simply shot in a classroom setting and meant to help with reconstruction. While televisions were not widely available nor affordable, those who could spend the money on them became community leaders and often invited the neighbourhood to visit. Bars and cafés turned from places where men would meet to argue or play cards into miniature cinemas where arguments over what show to watch would break out. Women and children were also more accepted inside the bars due to the lack of men post-war and their need to enter working society. Churches also bought televisions are a means of drawing people to spend time as part of those communities.

The Sanremo Music Festival, until then broadcast exclusively on radio, began television broadcasts in 1955, and since 1956 (though for a few years seen on other networks of the corporation), it carried the Eurovision Song Contest, which was derived from Sanremo.

=== 1960s ===
In the 1960s, with the advent of the economic boom, television, up until then a luxury item, turned into a mass object. On 4 November 1961, Rai launched its second network (Secondo Programma, the current Rai 2) while the existing Rai channel was renamed Programma Nazionale.

=== Rai reforms ===
The Rai reforms of 1975 introduced new norms related to the television reform: among other things, control of the public service passed from the Government to Parliament, cable broadcasts were regulated (thus encouraging the creation of local private TV) and each channel was assigned its own management. Telegiornale, which until then was a single unit that produced bulletins for both networks, was divided into two different newspapers: TG1 for the first channel and TG2 for the second. The first news programs under the new names were broadcast starting from 15 March 1976. On 5 April 1976, the National Program took on the name Rete 1 (Network 1).

The reform also provided for the establishment of the role of network director, guarantor figure for the contents broadcast by the channel, as well as that of the news director; the first directors of Rete 1 and TG1 were respectively Mimmo Scarano and Emilio Rossi, both Christian Democrats, appointed on 2 December 1975.

In 1977, the Carosello strand ended after a 20-year run; in the same year, Rai, after six years of trying, started producing its own programs in color, giving birth to the Italian neotelevisione period.

=== 1980s ===
After losing its television monopoly at a local scale in the previous decades, Rai lost it at a national scale; in 1980 the broadcasts of Canale 5 (owned by Fininvest of Milanese publisher Silvio Berlusconi) began, and in 1982, those of the Italia 1 (owned by Rusconi) and Rete 4 (owned by Mondadori) began.

Shortly after the launch of Rete 4, the three public channels changed names: on 2 October 1983, the three channels removed the word "Rete", replacing it with the current "Rai". In the same year, the logos for the three networks were created: Rai 1 was represented by a blue sphere. The name change occurred to prevent Rete 4 from being mistaken for a RAI channel.

By early 1988, some 14 million viewers watched TG1, with the vast majority of which remaining with the channel after the main edition ended.

=== 2000s ===
In 2002, Fabrizio Del Noce, akin to Forza Italia, became the channel's director.

== High-definition feed ==
The channel launched an HDTV 1080i simulcast in September 2013, available nationwide on subscription-television providers and on DTT (channel 1). Previously, HD programmes used to be aired on Rai HD.

== Availability outside Italy ==
In Slovenia, France (except Monaco), Greece, Austria, Lebanon, Hungary, Switzerland, Croatia, Lithuania, San Marino and Vatican City. The channel is also available to watch on satellite via Hellas Sat 4.

The channel used to be carried terrestrially in northern Tunisia. The secular audience in its catchment area preferred it to Tunisia's two channels, which were religiously charged at the time. It was also included on the legal Israeli cable networks when they started in 1989.

The three main Rai channels distributed over satellite are subject to content restrictions. This issue was criticized by Eurodeputee Gianni Pittella in September 2005, especially following its acquisition of the rights to the 2006 FIFA World Cup, claiming that the Italian diaspora in Europe was penalized for the blocking.

== Logos ==
3 October 1983 to 26 September 1988

18 May 2010 to 12 September 2016

In use since September 2016

== Directors of Rai 1 ==
Name	Period
Giuseppe Matteucci	3 January 1954 - 14 March 1976
Mimmo Scarano	15 March 1976 - 6 March 1980
Paolo Valmarana	7 March - 9 October 1980 (ad interim)
Emmanuele Milano	10 October 1980 - 6 April 1987
Giuseppe Rossini	7 April 1987 - 8 December 1988
Carlo Fuscagni	9 December 1988 - 25 October 1993
Nadio Delai	26 October 1993 - 16 September 1994
Brando Giordani	17 September 1994 - 14 August 1996
Giovanni Tantillo	15 August 1996 - 31 May 1998
Agostino Saccà	1 June 1998 - 18 June 2000
Agostino Saccà	30 April 2001 - 5 May 2002
Pier Luigi Celli	19 June - 10 September 2000
Maurizio Beretta	11 September 2000 - 29 April 2001
Fabrizio Del Noce	6 May 2002 - 27 May 2009
Mauro Mazza	28 May 2009 - 28 November 2012
Giancarlo Leone	29 November 2012 - 17 February 2016
Andrea Fabiano	18 February 2016 - 11 October 2017
Angelo Teodoli	12 October 2017 - 26 November 2018
Teresa De Santis	27 November 2018 - 14 January 2020
Stefano Coletta	14 January 2020 - June 2022

From June 2022, as part of a management reorganization of Rai, network management has been abolished in favour of gender ones.

== Current programmes ==
=== Events ===
- Con il cuore (2003, since 2007)
- David di Donatello (1963-1967, 1969, 1971-1972, 1976-1977, 1979, 1984, 1986, 1988-1995, 1997-2000, 2002, 2004-2005, 2009-2015, since 2018)
- Diversity Media Awards (since 2022, first on Real Time (TV channel))
- Eurovision Song Contest (1956-1965, 1971-1973, 1975-1977, 1979, 1983, 1989, 1991, 1993, 1997, since 2016)
- Festival di Castrocaro
- Junior Eurovision Song Contest (since 2022, first on Rai Gulp)
- L'anno che verrà (since 2003)
- La partita del cuore (1992-2020, from 2024)
- Notte della Taranta (since 2021, first on Rai 2 and Rai 5)
- Premio Bellisario (since 2019, first on Rai 2)
- Premio Tenco (since 2023, first on Rai 2 and Rai 3)
- Prix Italia (since 2019, first on Rai 3)
- Oscars - La notte in diretta (from 2024, first on Canale 5 and Sky Uno)
- Sanremo Giovani (1993-1998, 2001, since 2015)
- Sanremo Music Festival (since 1955 (1955-1962 and from 1981, every night; 1963-1980, only final night))
- Telethon (since 1990, first on Rai 2 and Rai 3)
- TIM Music Awards (since 2012, first on Italia 1)
- Tutti a scuola (since 2000)
- Una. Nessuna. Centomila – in Arena (2024)
- Una voce per Padre Pio (since 2000)
- Zecchino d'Oro (since 1959)

=== Shows in prime time ===
- Ballando con le stelle (since 2005)
- I migliori anni (2008-2013, 2016-2017, from 2023)
- Tale e quale show (dal 2012)
- Tale e quale show - Il torneo (from 2012)
- Natale e quale show (2016, from 2022)
- Tali e quali (2019, from 2022)
- The Voice Senior (from 2020)
- Tale e quale Sanremo (from 2023)
- The Voice Kids (from 2023)
- The Voice Generations (from 2024)
- L'acchiappatalenti (from 2024)
- TIM Summer Hits (from 2024, first on Rai 2)

=== Game shows ===
- L'eredità (since 2002)
- Affari tuoi (2003-2017, from 2023)
- Reazione a catena (since 2007)

=== Daytime entertainment ===
- Domenica in (since 1976)
- Sottovoce (since 1994)
- Applausi (since 2004)
- Cinematografo (since 2004)
- Testimoni e protagonisti (since 2010)
- Unomattina in famiglia (since 2010, first on Rai 2)
- Ballando on the Road (since 2017)
- Da noi... a ruota libera (since 2019)
- È sempre mezzogiorno (since 2020)
- Ciao maschio (since 2021)
- Camper (since 2022)
- Unomattina Weekly (since 2022)
- La volta buona (from 2023)
- I vinili di... (from 2024, first on Sky Uno and Rai 3)

=== Disclosure and culture ===
- Check-up (1977-2002, since 2023)
- Linea verde (television program) (since 1981)
- Linea verde Estate (since 1982)
- Linea blu (since 1994), focusing on the Mediterranean Sea and shores
- Overland (since 1996)
- Passaggio a Nord Ovest (since 1997)
- Linea bianca (2000-2001, since 2014)
- Il caffè (since 2011)
- Milleeunlibro - Scrittori in tv (since 2013)
- Buongiorno benessere (since 2014)
- Stanotte a... (since 2015)
- Codice: la vita è digitale (since 2017)
- Meraviglie (since 2018)
- Superquark natura (since 2018)
- Linea verde Life (since 2018)
- Ulisse - Il piacere della scoperta (since 2018, first on Rai 3)
- Linea verde Start (since 2021)
- Azzurro - Storie di mare (since 2021)
- Linea verde Explora (since 2022)
- Linea verde Discovery (since 2022)
- Linea verde Sentieri (since 2022)
- Camper in viaggio (since 2023)
- Noos - L'avventura della conoscenza (since 2023)
- Noos - Viaggio nella natura (since 2023)
- Linea verde Bike (since 2023)
- Linea blu Discovery (since 2023)
- Linea verde Tipico (since 2023)

=== News and information ===
- Tribuna elettorale (since 1960)
- TV7 (since 1963)
- TG1 (since 1976)
- Speciale TG1 (since 1976)
- Meteo Verde (since 1981)
- Appuntamento al cinema (since 1981, also broadcast on other Rai networks Rai)
- Unomattina (since 1986)
- Unomattina Estate (since 1992)
- TG Parlamento (from 1993, also on Rai 2 and Rai 3)
- Porta a porta (since 1996)
- La vita in diretta (since 2000, first on Rai 2)
- Storie italiane (since 2011)
- Estate in diretta (2011, since 2013)
- Cose nostre (since 2016)
- Rai Meteo (since 2018, also broadcast on other networks RAI)
- TG1 Mattina (since 2022)
- Storie di sera (since 2023)
- Cinque minuti (since 2023)
- XXI secolo, quando il presente diventa futuro (since 2023)
- 1mattina News (since 2025)

=== Editing ===
- Techetechete' (since 2012), a programme using video clips, images, and vintage films from the RAI archive and connected to each other based on a specific. theme, thread, or character.
- TecheTeche Top Ten (from 2024)

=== Entertainment ===
- Il cantante mascherato
- Arena Suzuki

=== Documentaries and culture ===
- Quark Atlante, SuperQuark Saturday afternoon spin-off, focusing on wilderness and adventure
- Linea Verde, focusing on wilderness, agriculture and rural cooking, hosted by Patrizio Roversi and Daniela Ferolla
- Overland World Truck Expedition, adventure and documentary expeditions
- Rewind – Visioni private, focusing on TV history
- Magazzini Einstein, focusing on arts and culture

=== TV series ===
- Il Commissario Montalbano, with Luca Zingaretti, produced in HD since Season 9
- Il giovane Montalbano (prequel of "Il Commissario Montalbano"), with Michele Riondino and Alessio Vassallo, produced in HD
- Don Matteo, with Terence Hill, Nino Frassica and Natalie Guetta, produced in HD since Season 7
- Un passo dal cielo, with Terence Hill, produced in HD
- Fuoriclasse, with Luciana Littizzetto, produced in HD
- Che Dio ci aiuti, with Elena Sofia Ricci, produced in HD
- Der letzte Bulle, with Henning Baum and Maximilian Grill, produced in HD
- Provaci ancora prof, with Veronica Pivetti and Enzo Decaro, produced in HD since Season 5
- Questo nostro amore, historical drama with Anna Valle and Neri Marcorè, produced in HD
- Um Himmels Willen, with Fritz Wepper, produced in HD since Season 8
- Un medico in famiglia, with Lino Banfi, Giulio Scarpati and Margot Sikabonyi, produced in HD since Season 6
- Una pallottola nel cuore, with Gigi Proietti, produced in HD

=== Sports ===
- FIFA World Cup Finals (if Italy team involved only, 1954–2014)
- UEFA Europa League
- UEFA Conference League
- UEFA European Championship
- UEFA European Under-21 Championship (5 matches: three Italy group matches, one semi-final, and one final)
- UEFA Nations League (Italy matches only, plus a final)
- Italy national football team: Nations League, qualifiers, friendlies, and finals tournament

=== Kids ===
- 44 Cats
- Jurassic Cubs
- Prezzemolo
- Tommy e Oscar
- Topo Gigio
- Piccolo Pollone
- Chappy

== Past programmes ==
=== Events ===
- Safety Love (2024)
- La grande Opera Italiana patrimonio dell'umanità (2024)

=== Documentaries ===
- La nostra Raffaella (2024), documentary on Raffaella Carrà
- Marconi - L'uomo che ha connesso il mondo (2024)
- Perché Sanremo è Sanremo? (2024)
- Sanremo Dietro la Quinta (2024)

=== Films ===
- Un amore in Cornovaglia (2024) (Note: This film was broadcast on Rai 1 on July 24, 2024. The film title in English is "The Presence of Love" (Hallmark Channel Original Movies))
- Dirty - Dancing - Balli proibiti (2024) (Note: This film was broadcast on July 31, 2024 on Rai 1)

== Early programmes ==
Until the autumn 1976/77 season, regular broadcasting was in monochrome (black and white), with very few exceptions (shown in bold). Regular colour broadcasting began during the winter 1976/77 season.

- Un due tre... aka 1, 2, 3, satire/variety show starring Raimondo Vianello e Ugo Tognazzi. Considered one of the most influential shows in Italian television history, it was discontinued in 1959 after the duo performed an ironic sketch about then-president of the Republic, Giovanni Gronchi (six seasons, from 19 January 1954 to 2 August 1959).
- Lascia o raddoppia, a one-hour-long game show hosted by Mike Bongiorno (1955–59, on Thursday, at 9:00 PM, except for the first season shown on Saturday night).
- Primo applauso, early talent show hosted by Enzo Tortora and Silvana Pampanini. The clap-o-metre was introduced to Italian television during this programme. Magician Silvan and singer Adriano Celentano debuted in Primo Applauso (from 29 April 1956 until December of the same year, Sunday night, 9:00 PM).
- Telematch, variety/game show hosted by Enzo Tortora and Silvio Noto (from 6 January 1957 to July 1958, Sunday night at 9:15 PM).
- La macchina per vivere, health care/educational programme about the human body (two seasons, from 31 January 1957, Thursday night at 10:45 PM).
- Il Musichiere, a one-hour-long Italian version of Name That Tune, hosted by Mario Riva until his death (1957–60, on Saturday nights at 9:00 PM).
- Campanile Sera, a one-hour-long game show, hosted by Enzo Tortora, Mike Bongiorno and Enza Sampò (1959–61, on Thursday at 9:00 PM). One of the various games on the show, "il gioco dei prezzi", was an early Italian incarnation of The Price Is Right franchise.
- Studio Uno, Saturday night variety show, hosted mainly by Mina (1961–66, 9:00 PM).
- L'amico del giaguaro, Saturday night comedy/variety show, hosted by Corrado and starring Gino Bramieri, Marisa Del Frate and Raffaele Pisu. Broadcast during 1961, 1962 and 1964 summer seasons, at 9:00 PM.
- Giocagiò, daytime half-hour-long Italian version of the BBC children's show Play School (1966–70, Monday, Wednesday and Friday, at 5:00 PM)
- L'Odissea, eight one hour episodes of a screenplay of Homer's Odyssey, directed by Franco Rossi and starring Bekim Fehmiu as Odysseus and Irene Papas as Penelope. This Italian-German-French-Yugoslavian co-production was broadcast for the first time in Italy from 24 March 1968, on Sunday night, at 9:05 PM. In colour, but the programme was shown in black and white in Italy the first time it was aired.
- Eneide, seven one hour episodes of a screenplay of Virgil's Aeneid, directed by Franco Rossi and starring Giulio Brogi (Aeneas) and Olga Karlatos (Dido). This Italian-German-French co-production was broadcast for the first time in Italy from 19 December 1971, on Sundays, at 9:00 PM and in Germany from 5 November 1972. In colour.
- Le avventure di Pinocchio, five one hour episodes of a screenplay of Collodi's children novel The Adventures of Pinocchio, directed by Luigi Comencini and starring Nino Manfredi (Geppetto), Gina Lollobrigida (the Fairy with Turquoise Hair), Franco Franchi (the Cat), Ciccio Ingrassia (the Fox), Vittorio De Sica (the Judge) and child actor Andrea Balestri in the main role of Pinocchio. This very successful French-German-Italian coproduction aired for the first time in Italy on Saturday night from 8 April 1972, at 9:00 PM. The French version is about 40 minutes longer and is divided into 6 episodes. In colour.
- Fatti e fattacci, variety show, hosted by Gigi Proietti and Ornella Vanoni, directed by Antonello Falqui (four episodes, from 15 February 1975, Saturday night at 8:40 PM). In colour.
- Dov'è Anna, drama/giallo miniseries in seven episodes, starring Scilla Gabel and Mariano Rigillo, broadcast on Tuesday, from 13 January 1976, at 8:45 PM.
- Albert e l'Uomo Nero (the title, roughly translated, means Albert and the Bogeyman), drama/giallo miniseries in three episodes, starring Nando Gazzolo, Franco Graziosi and then kid Claudio Cinquepalmi in the title role of Albert. Avant-garde soundtrack by Franco Micalizzi. It was perhaps the last successful Italian black and white drama series, aired on 21 March (Sunday), 23 March (Tuesday) and 28 March (Sunday) nights at 8:45 PM.
- Bontà loro, one-hour-long late night talk show hosted by Maurizio Costanzo, is considered by some critics to be the first modern talk show on Italian television (two seasons, from 18 October 1976, Monday night, 10:45 PM). In colour from 1977.
- Non Stop, one-hour-long comedy consisting of a collage of sketches performed by young and (then) unknown comedians – among these, future theatrical actor and director Carlo Verdone and actors Massimo Troisi and Lello Arena. Broadcast for two seasons (1977-8 and 1978-9), on Thursday night, at 8:40 PM.

== Monthly share ==
Auditel data related to the average monthly day on the target of viewers over the age of 4.

Since May 2022, the ratings evaluation criteria have changed.

Year	Jan	Feb	Mar	Apr	May	Jun	Jul	Aug	Sep	Oct	Nov	Dec	Year average
2012	19,22%	21,10%	19,32%	18,31%	18,36%	19,09%	15,84%	14,47%	17,08%	17,99%	18,83%	18,07%	18,09%
2013	18,59%	20,89%	19,38%	18,47%	18,26%	16,48%	15,98%	15,91%	16,51%	17,22%	17,86%	16,64%	17,81%
2014	17,58%	18,84%	17,52%	16,83%	16,26%	17,94%	16,63%	15,30%	16,84%	17,95%	18,11%	17,54%	17,35%
2015	17,33%	19,70%	16,86%	16,84%	16,57%	15,54%	15,34%	15,61%	16,89%	17,50%	17,30%	17,11%	16,96%
2016	17,60%	20,01%	17,72%	17,31%	16,59%	17,94%	14,97%	13,45%	15,49%	15,85%	15,79%	15,65%	16,63%
2017	17,19%	19,26%	17,30%	16,95%	16,54%	15,99%	14,99%	15,20%	16,25%	15,90%	16,68%	16,55%	16,64%
2018	17,22%	19,86%	17,05%	17,09%	16,51%	14,38%	14,59%	16,20%	17,23%	16,36%	16,41%	16,47%	16,70%
2019	16,86%	19,64%	16,58%	16,60%	16,29%	15,44%	14,31%	14,05%	15,65%	16,20%	16,41%	16,19%	16,28%
2020	17,12%	20,56%	16,94%	15,76%	15,69%	15,85%	14,55%	14,80%	15,50%	16,55%	16,78%	16,27%	16,36%
2021	16,41%	16,57%	19,10%	15,76%	16,96%	18,77%	17,05%	14,55%	16,31%	17,15%	17,52%	17,20%	17,13%
2022	17,32%	21,20%	17,42%	16,69%	18,63%	17,08%	15,89%	16,09%	18,56%	19,01%	19,08%	20,15%	18,18%
2023	19,34%	23,52%	18,76%	17,90%	18,21%	16,93%	15,98%	15,83%	17,10%	18,48%	18,22%	17,76%	18,28%
2024	18,55%	23,46%	19,08%	18,34%	17,60%	18,09%	15,83%	14,01%	17,25%	18,01%	18,19%	18,60%	18,19%
2025	19,42%	23,93%	19,55%	18,93%	18,60%	17,16%							
