= Tagesschau =

Tagesschau (German for View of the Day) is the name of a news and public affairs program shared by three networks in Europe:

- Tagesschau (German TV programme), broadcast by ARD
- SRF Tagesschau, broadcast by Swiss television SRF 1
- Tagesschau (Italian TV programme), broadcast by RAI Sender Bozen in South Tyrol, Italy
