= Rai 2 =

Italian TV channel

- Logo used since 2016
- Country: Italy
- Broadcast area: Italy and San Marino, reaching bordering regions via overspill of the Italian terrestrial network
- Headquarters: Rome, Italy

Programming
- Language: Italian
- Picture format: 1080i HDTV (downscaled to 16:9 576i for the SDTV feed)

Ownership
- Owner: RAI
- Sister channels: Rai 1 Rai 3 Rai 4 Rai 5 Rai Gulp; Italiana; Rai Movie; Rai News 24; Rai Premium; Rai Sport; Rai Storia; Rai Yoyo; Rai Ladinia; Rai Südtirol; Rai Italia

History
- Launched: 4 November 1961; 65 years ago
- Former names: Secondo Programma (1961–1975); Rete 2 (1975–1983); Rai Due (1983–2010)

Links
- Website: rai.it/rai2

Availability

Terrestrial
- Digital terrestrial television: Channel 2 (HD); Channel 502 (SD)

Streaming media
- RaiPlay: Live Streaming (Only in Italy)

Rai 2 (Rai Due) is an Italian free-to-air television channel owned and operated by state-owned public broadcaster RAI – Radiotelevisione italiana. It is the company's second television channel, and is known for broadcasting TG2 news bulletins, talk shows, reality television, drama series, sitcoms, cartoons and infotainment. In the 1980s it was known for its political affiliation to the Italian Socialist Party, it has shifted recently its focus towards the youth, including in its schedule reality shows, entertainment, TV series, news, knowledge and sports.

The second television channel in Italy, it was launched on 4 November 1961, seven years after RAI's first channel was launched on 3 January 1954. The channel was initially referred to as "Secondo Programma". It received other names, such as "Rete 2" and "Rai Due" until it adopted its current name "Rai 2". It is a direct competitor to Mediaset's Italia 1. It is also a state-owned channel like Rai 1.

== History ==
=== Birth and early years ===
Rai announced the opening of its second television network in late 1960. Its early plans suggested that the network would open by the autumn of 1961. In the company's roadmap, it was planned that Rai would have 32 transmitters and 11 relayers carrying the service by year-end 1962.

This evening for us, citizens of the monoscope, subjects of the antennas, inscribed in the roles of the telescreen, this is a great day. A few minutes ago, on the building in via Teulada, a 17-inch hand displayed a white ribbon. And then you all know it: the Second Channel was born. Do you want to see the newborn? Ssssht, be quiet, he's so small. But the doctor says he will turn out very well. Anyway, shall we take a look at it? [...] Have you seen? His fate is already sealed, he was born in the name of victory. And now tell me that I'm rhetorical, that I'm sentimental but I want to dedicate a toast to this second television son. Cheers Second Channel! We consider you a friend and even if, as in the dynasties of monarchs, you bear the name Canale Secondo, we wish you to be second to none and now, little new channel, good night.

— 4 November 1961: Mina's wishes to the newly created channel during the program Studio Uno

Rai 2 begins its regular broadcasts on 4 November 1961 (after three months of experimental broadcasts, starting from 1 August that same year) under the name Secondo Programma: the birth of Rai's second network was baptized by Aba Cercato, who presented the inaugural broadcast of the nascent channel, dedicated to the First World War, with the airing of Giuseppe Dessi's miniseries La trincea, given the coincidence of the launch of the channel with National Unity and Armed Forces Day; the birth of the new channel was also celebrated by Mina during Studio Uno, on the air, though, on Programma Nazionale, the extant network. Its first director was Angelo Romanò, flanked by Fabio Borrelli and Pier Emilio Gennarini.

Already from its inception, the channel had the aim of broadcasting alternative programming to that of Programma Nazionale, but for a long time, it was considered Rai's minor channel: its programmes had much more limited budgets compared to the first channel and furthermore, while the variety shows on the National Programme featured the great stars of the time as protagonists, on the Second Programme instead space was given to the new talents of entertainment who, once they achieved popularity, were "promoted" on the first channel. Some examples in this sense are Diamoci tu and Teatro 11.

The channel featured new talent, who would later become well-known on television, and new formats. Starting from 1965, Jeux Sans Frontières (where Italy would eventually take part in every edition) aroused interest throughout the country; furthermore in 1969 Renzo Arbore debuted with the variety show Speciale per voi, one of the first television programmes aimed at a young audience with musical guests and studio debates; in 1967 another historic summer event began to be broadcast, the Festivalbar, a musical event that became an event for young people. In 1970, Rischiatutto debuted, the iconic game show by Mike Bongiorno which became a great success, so much so that the Rai top management decided to move it to the first channel for the 1972 and 1974 finals.

From its first day on air the channel aired Telegiornale del Secondo Programma (the current TG2), a brief news bulletin that aired after Telegiornale which had the aim of informing all those viewers who had missed the news on the first channel; this news programme, which included rapid investigations and quicker news, was produced in a different way than that of the Programma Nazionale. Enzo Biagi, already director of Telegiornale, debuted as a presenter in 1962 on Secondo Programma with RT Rotocalco Televisivo, the first Italian topical magazine programme.

In these years, Secondo Programma aired TV series and miniseries produced for the channel (with a smaller budget than their counterparts on Programma Nazionale): these included Mastro Don Gesualdo, L'ultima boheme, Paura per Janet and the French miniseries Belphegor, or the Phantom of the Louvre, this last one also repeated on the first channel. In the early 70s, it aired programs related to animation, such as Mille e una sera and GULP! - I Fumetti in TV. Even the second channel reserved a small slot for advertising, in alternative to the first channel's Carosello with Intermezzo, which aired until the end of 1976.

At 3:50pm on August 22, 1972, the channel made its first color broadcast - albeit experimental - employing the PAL format. Rosanna Vaudetti, who launched Secondo Programma in 1961, delivered the first color announcement, introducing the opening ceremony of the 1972 Summer Olympics. She donated the dress she wore for the announcement to the Rai Radio and Television Museum in 2025.

=== The Fichera management ===
With the 1975 RAI reforms, Secondo Programma, in 1976, was given the new name Rete 2 (Network 2), and as consequence, Telegiornale del Secondo Programma became TG2, separating itself from the extant Telegiornale brand (eventually becoming TG1) and becoming completely autonomous; the network and its newscast were given their own directives, assuring the contents they aired. The first network and TG2 directors were respectively Massimo Fichera (nominated on 2 December 1975) and Andrea Barbato (nominated on 16 December), of Socialist expression.

The network declared itself more youthful and experimental in contrast to Rete 1: here, programs such as L'altra domenica came to be, seen as an alternative to Domenica in, aired until the early 80s, and Buonasera con..., program which featured the participation of showbiz personalities. Still under Fichera's management, other programs deemed controversial for its period were born, such as Odeon, airing from 1976 to 1978, Stryx, aired in 1978 and presented by Tony Renis, Onda libera (noted under the name Televacca) presented Roberto Benigni and the historic tourist travel program Sereno variabile, presented by Osvaldo Bevilacqua, which aired until 2019. In 1979, the channel airs the Processo per stupro.

There was also Portobello, created and hosted by Enzo Tortora, who returned to Rai after eight years of exile spent managing local stations. The program aired starting in May 1977; initially placed in late evening and broadcast in black and white, after a short time it became a successful program so much so that from the following autumn it was promoted to prime time and began to be broadcast in color (in reality it should have broadcast with this system from the first episode, so as to be officially the first color program on the channel, but the studios at the Milan fair from where it was broadcast were only equipped at the beginning of 1978).

== Logo ==
3 October 1983 - 26 September 1988

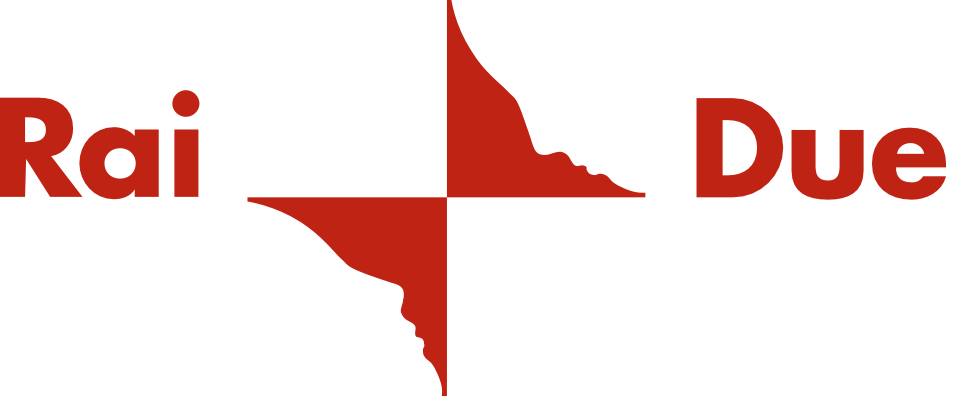
23 October 2000 - 18 May 2010

18 May 2010 - 12 September 2016

In use since 12 September 2016

== Past programmes ==
=== Documentaries ===
- Butterfly (2020) (Note: This film was broadcast on Rai 2 on November 27, 2020. The film was released in 2018. The documentary tells the story of Irma Testa.)

== Former programming ==
Until 1975, regular broadcasting was in black-and-white, with very few exceptions. In late 1975, then-called Rete 2 began airing some new programmes in colour, then beginning semi-regular colour broadcasting during the autumn season (a few hours a week). Rai 1 followed its "sister network" a few months later. Eventually, regular broadcasting in colour began on 1 February 1977.

- Rischiatutto – An hour-long Italian version of Jeopardy!, presented by Mike Bongiorno, aired on Thursday nights, from 5 February 1970, at 9:15 pm (in 1972 season at 9:30 pm). About 20 million viewers watched every episode of the show. The first one aired on Rai 2 to enter in the list of the Ten Most Watched Programmes on Italian TV during the year. The final two seasons (1973 and 1974) were aired on Rai 1.
- Ondalibera (known popularly as Televacca, Cow TV) – An hour-long comedy and satirical programme presented by a very young Roberto Benigni in his television debut. In the show, the Tuscan peasant Mario Cioni (Benigni) presents a programme aired on the fictional local channel Televacca, in which its headquarters are based in a stable full of hay and animals. Speaking in a sometimes vulgar and desecrating manner, with a heavy Tuscan accent, Benigni improvised monologues and satirised society and the medium of television. The programme was co-hosted by the boor Monna (Carlo Monni) and his "daughter" Donatella, a stylish young woman reminiscent of Daisy Mae Yokum. Considered one of the most controversial programmes in Italian TV history, censored and interrupted after only four episodes despite being relatively successful, the programme first aired on 19 December 1976, airing on Sunday nights at 8:45 PM.
