= Italiana (powered by Rai) =

Italian television channel

- Logo used on 1 October 2026
- Country: Italy

Programming
- Language: Italian
- Picture format: 720p HDTV (downscaled to 16:9 576i for the SDTV feed)

Ownership
- Owner: RAI
- Sister channels: Rai 1 Rai 2 Rai 3 Rai 4 Rai 5 Rai Gulp; Rai Movie; Rai News 24; Rai Premium; Rai Sport; Rai Storia; Rai Yoyo; Rai Ladinia; Rai Südtirol; Rai Italia

History
- Launched: 28 June 1999; 27 years ago (as Rai Edu Lab); 10 June 2002; 24 years ago (as Rai Edu 1); 19 October 2009; 17 years ago (as Rai Scuola); 1 October 2026; 47 days ago (as Italiana)
- Replaced: Rai Edu Lab (1999–2002); Rai Edu 1 (2002–2009); Rai Scuola (2009–2026)

Availability

Terrestrial
- Digital terrestrial television: Channel 57 (HD)

Streaming media
- RaiPlay: Live Streaming

Italiana (powered by Rai) is an Italian free-to-air television channel owned by Rai, an arm of state-owned broadcaster RAI, which replaced former channel Rai Scuola.

== Programming ==
The channel broadcasts documentaries, culture, and cuisine.

== History ==
Replacing RaiSat 3 - Encyclopedia, Rai Scuola started broadcasting only via satellite on 28 June 1999 under the name of Rai Educational Sat.

On 10 June 2002, after the channel was split, it changed its name to Rai Edu 1 and, on 19 October 2009, to Rai Scuola.

From 3 February 2004, Rai Edu 1 also became available on digital terrestrial television in most of the Italian national territory with Mux B.

From 2 February 2009, it was replaced in this multiplex by Rai Storia, but the channel's broadcasts on digital terrestrial continued until 18 May 2010, when the logos of the Rai channels were renewed.

From 21 December 2011, the channel returned to broadcast on digital terrestrial for the areas covered by Mux 2 until 14 September 2015. It currently broadcasts on RAI Mux B.

From 4 January 2017, the channel began broadcasting in high definition on the Tivùsat satellite platform.

On 10 April 2017, Rai Scuola renewed its logo, graphics and colours, going from lilac to orange.

From 20 October 2021, the standard definition version on digital terrestrial switches to MPEG-4 encoding while remaining visible only on HD devices.

On 14 December 2021, following a frequency reorganization, the SD version was removed from satellite, leaving only the HD version available. Consequently, the channel became available free-to-air.

On 17 January 2022, following a reorganization of certain channels, it moved to channel 26 on Tivùsat.

On 8 March 2022, following a reorganization of digital terrestrial frequencies and channels, Rai Scuola moved to channel 57, previously occupied by Rai Sport + HD. From March 16, 2023, it is also available on channel 146, replacing Rai Sport HD, which remains available only on channel 58.

On 28 August 2024, the channel broadcasts its programming exclusively in high definition via the new DVB-T2 digital terrestrial standard, alongside Rai Storia and Rai Radio 2 Visual.

On 16 February 2026, the channel broadcasts on digital terrestrial television using HEVC encoding.

On 3 July 2026, during the presentation of the television schedules for the 2026/2027 season, Rai announced the closure of Rai Scuola effective from 30 September to 1 October 2026. The channel was replaced by Italiana, a new television channel focused on showcasing national culture, heritage, and productions.

== Logos and identities ==
Logo of Rai Edu 1, used from 2002 to 19 October 2009.

Logo of Rai Scuola, used from 19 October 2009 to 18 May 2010.

Logo of Rai Scuola, used from 18 May 2010 to 9 April 2017.

Logo of Rai Scuola, used from 10 April 2017 to 1 October 2026.

Italiana's first and current logo, used since 1 October 2026

== See also ==
- RAI
- Rai Storia
- Rai Nettuno Sat 1
