= Rai Extra =

Italian television channel

- Logo used from 18 May to 26 November 2010
- Country: Italy
- Broadcast area: Italy

Programming
- Language: Italian
- Picture format: 576i 4:3/16:9 (SDTV)

Ownership
- Owner: Rai

History
- Launched: 31 July 2003
- Replaced: RaiSat Album; RaiSat Show
- Closed: 26 November 2010
- Replaced by: Rai 5
- Former names: RaiSat Extra (2003-2010)

Rai Extra was an Italian television channel owned by RAI and broadcast on Digital terrestrial television in Italy.

Initially the channel was called RaiSat Extra. But on 18 May 2010, when Rai rebranded all its channels, the name RaiSat was extinguished, and the channel was renamed Rai Extra.

It broadcasts reruns of popular entertainment, infotainment and news programs produced or co-produced by the state-owned RAI television network.

Since 26 November 2010, the channel is replaced by Rai 5.

== Programming ==
- AnnoZero
- Ballarò
- Che tempo che fa
- In 1/2 h
- Porta a Porta
- 60 Minutes
- Late Show with David Letterman
- The Tonight Show with Jay Leno
- Piloti
- Parla con me
- Cielito lindo
- Libero
- Paolo Limiti Show
- Punto Donna
- Biberon
- 10 Hertz * SuperGulp!
- MenaBò
- Mixer
- Notte Rock
- Stasera pago io
- I raccomandati
- Telegiornale
- Buonasera con..
- Tante scuse
- 3, 2, 1...contatto!
- Controcanale * Controfagotto
- Canzonissima * Studio Uno
- Milleluci
- Fantastico
- Piccolo Slam
- Speciale per voi

== Logos ==
Logo used until 18 May 2010

Logo used from 18 May 2010 – 26 November 2010

== Closure ==
The broadcasts of Rai Extra ended after an episode of the sitcom Piloti on November 26, 2010, at 6:30 PM to make way for the new channel Rai 5. From that moment on, the logo of Rai Extra began to alternate with that of Rai 5 with a countdown at the bottom left that marked the start time of the transmissions of the new channel.

The contents of Rai Extra flowed partly into the RaiPlay web portal and partly onto the Rai Premium television station.
