= Rai Südtirol =

German-language radio and television service

Rai Südtirol is a German-language radio and television service provided by the Italian public-service broadcaster RAI to South Tyrol from its studios in Bozen, comprising two services:

- Rai Südtirol (TV channel), a television channel
- Rai Südtirol (radio), a radio station
