= Rai Storia =

- Logo used since 2017
- Country: Italy
- Headquarters: Rome, Italy

Programming
- Language: Italian
- Picture format: 1080i HDTV

Ownership
- Owner: RAI
- Sister channels: Rai 1 Rai 2 Rai 3 Rai 4 Rai 5 Rai Gulp; Italiana; Rai Movie; Rai News 24; Rai Premium; Rai Sport; Rai Yoyo; Rai Ladinia; Rai Südtirol; Rai Italia

History
- Launched: 17 June 2002; 24 years ago
- Former names: Rai Edu 2 (2002-2009)

Links
- Website: raistoria.rai.it

Availability

Terrestrial
- DTT: Channel 554 (HD)

Streaming media
- RaiPlay: Live streaming

Rai Storia (English: "Rai History") is an Italian television channel owned by Rai Cultura, an arm of broadcaster RAI available on digital terrestrial television in Italy. Launched on 17 June 2002 as Rai Edu 2, the channel adopted its current name on 2 February 2009 and it is broadcast in Italy on DTT channel 554 on mux Rai 4.

In May 2016, the channel stopped broadcasting advertisements. Since then it has been funded solely by the license fee.

== Logos and identities ==
Rai Storia's first logo, used until 2 February 2009.

Rai Storia's third and previous logo, used from 18 May 2010 to 9 April 2017.

Rai Storia's fourth and current logo since 10 April 2017.

== Programming ==
The channel broadcasts the programme La storia siamo noi and documentaries about history and culture from Rai Educational and Rai Teche.

== See also ==
- RAI
- Italiana
- Rai 5
