= Rai News 24 =

Italian public all-news TV channel

- Logo used since 2022
- Country: Italy
- Broadcast area: Italy (Free TV), Worldwide (Cable TV)
- Headquarters: Rome, Italy

Programming
- Language: Italian
- Picture format: 1080i HDTV (downscaled to 16:9 576i for the SDTV feed)

Ownership
- Owner: RAI
- Sister channels: Rai 1 Rai 2 Rai 3 Rai 4 Rai 5 Rai Gulp; Italiana; Rai Movie; Rai Premium; Rai Sport; Rai Storia; Rai Yoyo; Rai Ladinia; Rai Südtirol; Rai Italia

History
- Launched: 26 April 1999; 27 years ago
- Former names: RaiNews 24 (1999–2010); Rai News (2010–2013)

Links
- Website: rainews.it

Availability

Terrestrial
- Digital terrestrial television: Channel 48 (HD); Channel 548 (SD)

Streaming media
- RaiPlay: Live Streaming
- Sling TV: Channel 138

Rai News 24 (Italian: Rai News Ventiquattro) is an Italian free-to-air television channel operated by a state-owned public broadcaster RAI. It is the company's all-news television channel, and is known for its 24-hour rolling news service and its live coverage of breaking news.

== History ==
RaiNews 24 screen capture, 1999. 16 April 1999 17:41:20 CEST

It was launched on 26 April 1999, at 6 am. Until 19 May 2000, the channel broadcast live on weekdays only and re-aired previous recordings during the weekend. On 4 January 2017, the channel launched its own HD feed. Since 25 March 2022, during the Russo-Ukrainian war crisis, the channel started broadcasting the news in the Ukrainian language.

In the beginning, Rai News 24 was directed by Roberto Morrione.

The channel experimented with solutions that were then unusual in Italy, integrating television, the internet and digital technologies; the choice of multi-screen graphics, designed by Giuseppe Rogolino, was significant, as was the widespread use of connections in video conference with correspondents and experts. In particular, to reduce the number of bits necessary for coding of the signal, the screen was divided into various windows: the window occupied by the television signal occupied just under half the number of total pixels, as the other parts of the screen contained informative texts regarding the exact time, major news headlines, stock exchange and currency indices, the weather forecast, the addresses of the in-depth Internet sites for the various news and the logo of the news or column on air at that moment.

In the graphics, three text fields and two videos appeared simultaneously, so as to make the news come up even without listening to the audio, with an architecture based on HTML.

Until 19 May 2000, the channel broadcast live from Monday to Friday, offering only re-runs on weekends. From 20 May 2000 onwards, live broadcasts were also extended to the weekends.

At the end of 2005, Rai News 24 scored various exclusives on the war in Iraq, informing of the use of weapons such as white phosphorus or napalm (through an investigation by Sigfrido Ranucci) by the US military, and the combat behaviour of some Italian soldiers in Nassiriya. These and other journalistic results have been obtained despite the considerable scarcity of economic and technological resources compared to the other major Rai newspapers (the first budget was only 42 billion lire, of which 10 was only for editorial expenses). The issue recurred several times in the following years.

On 10 November 2006, Rai News 24 opened its own official channel on YouTube, with videos taken from the news and programmes aired; the channel was deleted in 2014 due to the end of the collaboration between Rai and YouTube

On 25 November 2006, under the authority of the channel's new director, Corradino Mineo, the channel introduced a new logo that omitted the Rai wordmark, used a new font, new initials and a new full-screen graphic design, designed by Giuseppe Rogolino; the branding graphics subsequently undergo a modification by the graphic designer Marco di Cesare. Double conduction was also introduced for some editions of the news. In collaboration with Rai 3, there was also the development of a newscast in Arabic for Rai Med. In the same period, the channel also began to broadcast through digital terrestrial television.

=== Developments and contrasts with Rai ===
Between 2010 and 2012, thanks also to the transition to digital terrestrial, Rai News 24 recorded a development in terms of ratings, but some contrasts arose between the editorial staff and the publisher Rai for various reasons.

On 3 May 2010, Rai announced that the simulcast of the channel on Rai 3 would now end at 7 am, to make room for Buongiorno Italia, a new programme by TGR; the decision was met with much dismay among staff.

On 18 May 2010, to commemorate the occasion of the transition to digital terrestrial television in Lombardy and eastern Piedmont, Rai launched a new corporate identity and its new television offerings. Consequently, Rai News 24 simply became Rai News, adopting a new graphic, in which the editorial staff reported technical problems, readability and functionality, in particular during the broadcast of the latest news.

On the same day, the suite of channels expanded, with the launch of Rai Sport 2. On the same day, the range of channels was expanded with the launch of Rai Sport 2. This involved Rai Way moving the channel from mux B to mux A (from mux 3 to mux 1 in fully digital areas). Due to a change in the technical parameters related to tuning, the Rai Sport 2 signal was activated on the satellite frequency previously in use by Rai News; therefore, the channel was unavailable until re-tuning was done. Spectators from various parts of Italy complained of reception problems on both platforms and interruptions of live TV coverage.

Following this, journalists interrupted the programming of Rai News and convened ameeting of the editorial committee in the studio, which was broadcast live on the channel (under the control of Vittorio Di Trapani). The assembly is attended by the secretary of the Associazione Stampa Romana, Paolo Butturini, who announced his intention to denounce Rai for the interruption of public service and talked openly about the channel's deliberate obscurity.

Rai responded with a statement, in which they categorically denied having obscured the channel and claimed to have notified the editorial staff of the imminent technical intervention. In another statement, Rai reiterated the strategic role of Rai News, assuring that it has duly alerted viewers to the need for retuning digital equipment (Rai Way communication of May 17, 2010). Rai stated, among other things, that the displacement of multiplexes guaranteed Rai News greater national coverage and the possibility of broadcasting regional programs (a procedure that is technically impossible on a multiplex with an isofrequency transmission such as Rai Mux B). In September, there was a proposal to shift the night edition of TGR from Rai 3 to Rai News; both the editorial staff of TGR and Rai News did not approve this choice, and the plan was eventually scrapped.

On 29 August 2011, Rai News 24 shifted into a new interim studio due to ongoing renovations of the previous one. In the new studio, diode lighting capable of reducing fuel consumption and thermal dispersion, and new remote-controlled cameras, were tested.

SInce October 2011, the channel, by corporate choice, hosted selected daily columns of the TGR, namely Piazza Affari and Italia Sera; however, TGR and Rai News did not approve of these variations being scheduled, resulting in the former being closed in December of that year, and the latter shifting to Rai 3.

In the same month, the director Corradino Mineo explained in an editorial and in some interviews with other newspapers the difficulties of Rai News' operational efficiency, due to the scracity of technical resources and staff, a circumstance he believed was linked to Rai's lack of interest in the network. The director complains, in particular, of the lack of recording operators in the studio, with the consequent obligation to adopt fixed cameras (and therefore a low quality of the television image), the poverty of graphics, (due to the absence of a newsroom specifically in charge of its management), the shortage of staff and multiple other problems.

On 15 December 2011, the Rai News programme renewed its sonic branding and branding graphics, transitioning to the 16:9 format, becoming the first Rai news programme to broadcast with this aspect ratio. Rai also announced a new version of the historic studio of the channel for early 2012, however, the project would only materialise in early 2013.

Since March 2012, following the example of competing news channel TGcom24, Rai News began to make flash news broadcasts on other Rai digital channels as "information snippets", which among other things, helped with promoting the network. In addition, due to Rai's cost-cutting policy, the channel's budget was reduced by 300,000 euros, which dropped it to just over five million euros.

In the same year, Rai proposed a merger between Rai News and Televideo, entrusting the task to deputy general director Antonio Marano, however, the idea was not approved by both companies.

=== The Maggioni management and the birth of the Rainews.it portal ===
On 8 January 2013, Corradino Mineo left the management of the channel, due to him being a candidate for leader in the Senate of the Republic in the Sicilian lists of the Democratic Party. Two days after the Board of Directors of Rai, the former presenter and head of the TG1 specials Monica Maggioni was appointed to the management.

On 24 February 2013, at 7am, the channel reverted to its previous name of Rai News 24, while setting up a new studio.

On 14 June 2013, the Board of Directors of Rai (Note: In Italian, it is referred to as "Il Consiglio di Amministrazione della Rai" which translates to English as "the Board of Directors of Rai) ratified the merger of the editorial staff of Rai News 24 with that of Televideo, prodrome to the birth of the unified newspaper Rai News and the portal of the same name, which becomes a reality on 1 December, to which Rai entrusts the task of acting as the main reference of Rai information on the network, joining the sites of Rai News 24 and Televideo in a single portal.

Maggioni also modified the editorial line of the channel, focusing mainly on current events and live events. The schedule also changes, also launching new program: Di Mattina, conducted initially by Silvana Pepe, then by Roberto Vicaretti and Emanuela Bonchino; With the time running, conducted by Alessandro Baracchini and Paolo Cappelli; All in an hour, conducted by Silvana Pepe from 20:00 to 21:00. In addition, the economic resources and the technical and human resources available are considerably increased.

On the ratings front, in 2013 Rai News 24 showed a slight increase in average listening compared to the previous year, while the 2014 index revealed a drop of 11% compared to the previous year and the previous year. Nevertheless, Rai News 24 however its primacy among the news channels in Italy. Some newspapers and political exponents judged such results poor compared to investments, while the Rainews.it portal obtained the 300º place among the most visited sites by Italian users.

=== Petrecca's Management ===
On 24 May 2024, Rai News 24 relaunched its YouTube channel with videos not from the news and programs broadcast on TV.

== Directors of Rai News 24 ==
- Roberto Morrione (from 1999 to 2006)
- Corradino Mineo (from 2006 to 2013)
- Monica Maggioni (from 2013 to 2016)
- Antonio di Bella (2016–2020)
- Andrea Vianello (2020–2021)
- Paolo Petrecca (since 2021)

== Programmes and presenters ==
Local times are CET.

- Night editions (00:00-06:00): Piero Marrazzo, Josephine Alessio, Emanuela Gialli, Valentina Dello Russo, Gabriele Martelloni, Dario Marchetti, Maria Buono, Renata Petillo, Pierfrancesco Pensosi, Giorgio Santelli, Antonella Alba, Federico Zatti, Eugenio Francesconi
- Morning editions (06:00-12:00): Paolo Cappelli, Francesco Musi, Laura Squillaci, Micol Pieretti, Chiara Burtulo, Cristina Raschio, Elena Scotoni, Maria Grazia Abbate, Roberto Rizzo, Valeria Ferrante, Alessandro Marchetti
- Afternoon editions (12:00-18:00): Alessandro Baracchini, Francesca Biagiotti, Giuseppina Testoni, Barbara Di Fresco, Lorenzo Di Las Plassas, Laura Cervellione, Annalisa Fantilli, Carlotta Macerollo, Laura Tangherlini, Annamaria Esposito, Francesca Piatanesi, Eva Giovannini, Cecilia Tosi
- Evening editions (18:00-00:00): Giancarlo Usai, Emanuela Bonchino, Sabrina Bellomo, Francesca Piatanesi, Massimiliano Melilli, Lorenzo Lo Basso, Elisa Dossi, Daniele Lorenzetti, Emilio Fuccillo, Andrea Vaccarella, Giulia Bosetti, Adele Grossi

Note:

- TG LIS (Italian Sign Language) is broadcast at 11:00 and at 20:00 each day and lasts between 5 and 10 minutes. Following it, the network returns to normal programming.
- The above list of presenters may not be accurate as some hosts may be temporary for one year only or be "relief hosts" (meaning they fill in as needed)

=== Press Review ===
Press Review is where newspapers are reviewed and read to the television audience with commentary that is watching from home.

From 2021 to 7 June 2024, the evening press review was broadcast as Sera24 (segment/slogan title for programme titled "Oggi e Domani, weekdays only) or Rassenga Stampa (translates to "Press Review" in English, weekends only), there were usually guests (mostly journalists from newspapers) that discuss and comment the next day headlines/topics from various Italy newspapers with the presenter.

On weekdays, the press review is broadcast on TV from 22:30 to 23:50. On weekends, the press review is from 23:15 to 23:50. The last 5 minutes on the weekdays and weekends version of the press review is the presenter commenting and reading the headlines from various Italy national newspapers. Between 23:50 and 00:00 is when the Focus 24 rubric or a report by a journalist is broadcast.

During the 2024–2025 season, the evening press review that was broadcast as Sera24 was switched back to its original name which was Rassenga Stampa. The program broadcast time and format for both weekdays and weekends remain unchanged from last season.

During the summer season, press review is broadcast from 23:00 to 23:50 on weekends and from 23:15 to 23:50 on weekends. The last 5 minutes on the weekdays and weekends version of press review's time slot is the presenter commenting and reading the headlines from various Italy national newspapers. Between 23:50 and 00:00 is when the Focus 24 rubric or a report by a journalist is broadcast.

Morning press reviews are done at 7 am and 8:30 am on weekdays. In the 8:30 am morning press reviews edition, there is usually a guest invited to discuss the newspaper headlines. On weekends, press reviews are broadcast at 7:30 am and then rebroadcast at 8:30 am. On holidays, press reviews are done at 7:30 am and at 8:30 am.

The world (or international) press review is done on weekdays at 7:45 am and is later rebroadcast at 9:45 am to discuss the world newspapers' headlines.

- Evening press review: Emilio Fuccillo, Lorenzo Lo Basso, Massimiliano Melilli, Francesca Biagiotti, Chiara Paduano
  - Relief presenters: Daniele Lorenzetti, Giancarlo Usai, Laura Tangherlini, Giuseppina Testoni
  - Former presenters: Valentina Dello Russo, Emanuela Bonchino, Sabrina Bellomo, Gianluca Semprini and Emanuela Bonchino
- Morning press review: Roberto Vicaretti (weekdays) and Macro Silenzi (weekends)
  - Relief presenters: Micol Pieretti, Annalisa Fantilli, Chiara Burtulo, Paolo Cappelli
  - Former presenters: Sabrina Bellomo, Gianluca Semprini, Carlotta Macerollo,
- World press review: Paolo Cappelli

=== News programmes ===
Program Name	Description	Time slot	Presenter
Cronache dall'Italia	Weekday show featuring Italy top news headlines with live reporting	Weekdays, 9:30 to 9:45am	Various presenters but it usually the person that does Rassenga Stampa during Mattina 24
Economica 24	Discussion of the economy with guests	Weekdays, 17:30 to 18:00 (except summer and holidays)	Cristina Raschio, Riccardo Cavalliere, Raffaele Cappuccio, Annalisa Salsano, Alessandro Marchetti
Focus 24	This is a rebroadcast of an earlier interview or discussion that happened earlier in the day or from the previous day that focuses on a specific topic. The run time is usually between 5 and 12 minutes.	Various times throughout the week but usually after 19:30 and the next day between 12 am and 5 am.	Not applicable
In un'ora	Discussion of today's headlines in 1 hour with guests	Weekdays, 18:30 to 19:30 (except summer and holidays)	*Gianluca Semprini (2022); *Giancarlo Usai (25 September 2023 – present)
Lo Stato dell'Unione	Discussion of European Politics with guests	Sundays, 10:30 to 11:30 am	Donato Bendicenti
Mattina 24 (2022–present)	Weekday morning show featuring the top headlines. When the show is broadcast again at 7:30 am, the presenter summaries the news headline and then proceed to discuss Italy's arts, culture and society, news and events with guests. This broadcast is also known as Finestra sull'Italia	Weekdays, 6 to 7 am and 7:30 to 7:45 am (except summer and holidays)	* Chiara Paduano (April 2022 - 29 June 2023) * Roberta Ammendola (25 September 2023 – 7 June 2024)
News in English (2022–present)	A concise, English-language summary of the day's major Italian political, economic, and domestic news.	Weekdays, 13:29 to 13:40	Nick Porcellato
Periferie (2023-)	TBA	Saturday, 11:05 am to 12:00 pm	Lorenzo Lo Basso and Annalisa Fantilli
Pomeriggio 24	TBA	Weekdays, 14:30 to 16:00 (except summer and holidays)	* Alessandro Baracchini (2022–2023) * Giuseppina Testoni (25 September 2023 -7 June 2024)
TEЛEНOBИHИ - TG in lingua ucraina (26 March 2022 – present)	Ukraine News in Ukrainian language	7 days a week, 15:00 to 15:05	Not applicable
Specchio dei tiempi	Discussion of politics, economy and other news with guests	Weekdays, 10 to 11 am (except summer and holidays)	Roberto Vicaretti
Sport 24	* Discussion of sports headlines with guests * The 19:30 broadcast features today's sports news headlines with no presenter, it is a broadcast with various sports news segment combined * The 20:30 show that is broadcast on Mondays only is usually a discussion of soccer headlines with sports journalists.	* 12:30 to 13:00 (7 days a week) * Between 19:30 and 20:00 (10-12 mins, 7 days a week) * 20:30 to 20:45 (Mondays only)	* Laura Cervellione * Francesco Musi * Marco Lollobrigida (Mondays only at 20:30)

=== Other programmes ===
- 24MM L'Approfondimento (Mondays between 19:30 and 20:00 and rebroadcast on Fridays between 19:30 and 20:00)
- AR - Frammenti d'arte (Saturdays): Costantino D'Orazio
- Altri Mondi (2023–present, Thursday at 16:45): Dario Marchetti
- Amarcord (Mondays through Fridays at 17:20-17:30, 5–10 minutes)
- Basta la Salute (Wednesdays): Gerardo D'Amico
- Cammina Italia (Saturdays at 14:30 and rebroadcast at 21:30): Alfredo Di Giovampaolo
- Central Park West (Saturdays): Antonio Monda
- Futuro24 (Mondays at 16:45 and rebroadcast at 21:45): Andrea Bettini and Marco Dedola
- Rai Meteo (approximately every 30 minutes)
- Motori24 (Saturdays at 13:30 and rebroadcast on Sundays at 13:30): Gemma Favia
- La via dei libri (Tuesdays at 11:45 and rebroadcast at 21:45): Loretta Cavaricci | Former presenter(s): Paola Marinozzi, Enrica Tommasini, Mario Forenza, Carlotta Macerollo
- Scienze e Tecnologia: Andrea Bettini and Marco Dedola
- Spotlight (Fridays, except summer)
- Tutti Frutti (Fridays): Laura Squillaci
- Sapori e colori (Thursdays): Silvia Rita
- Pillole di Poesia (weekdays after Specchio dei tiempi and Pomeriggio 24 program, 2022–present): Luce Cardinale

Note: The above programme may be reaired at other times throughout the week until a new episode of that programme is aired. Dates indicated in parentheses are when a new episode of that programme is usually out.

=== Former programmes ===
- Piano Pianissimo: Guido Zaccagnini
- DigiTango (2 May 2022- 26 June 2023, Mondays at 20:30)
- Ma che Mu (2022–2023): Fausto Pellegrini and Alessandra Sacchetta | Program interviews music artists.
- Pillole di fisica

== Logos ==
2006 – 2010

2013 – 2022

2022 – present
