= Rai Yoyo =

Italian free-to-air kids television channel

- Logo used since 2017
- Country: Italy
- Broadcast area: Italy and San Marino, reaching bordering regions via overspill of the Italian terrestrial network
- Headquarters: Rome, Italy

Programming
- Language: Italian
- Picture format: 1080i HDTV (downscaled to 16:9 576i for the SDTV feed)

Ownership
- Owner: RAI
- Sister channels: Rai 1 Rai 2 Rai 3 Rai 4 Rai 5 Rai Gulp; Italiana; Rai Movie; Rai News 24; Rai Premium; Rai Sport; Rai Storia; Rai Ladinia; Rai Südtirol; Rai Italia

History
- Launched: 1 November 2006; 20 years ago (as RaiSat YoYo); 18 May 2010; 16 years ago (as Rai Yoyo)
- Former names: RaiSat Yoyo (2006-2010)

Links
- Website: raiplayyoyo.it

Availability

Terrestrial
- Digital terrestrial television: Channel 43 (SD)

Streaming media
- RaiPlay: Live streaming

Rai Yoyo is an Italian free-to-air television channel owned and operated by state-owned public broadcaster RAI – Radiotelevisione italiana. It is the company's television channel for younger children and preschoolers. The channel is best known for its programming for children between the ages of two and five.

== History ==
On 1 November 2006, RaiSat Ragazzi was split into two channels: RaiSat Yoyo (for preschoolers) and RaiSat Smash (for teens). Notable programmes include Postman Pat, Peppa Pig and Fifi and the Flowertots, among others.

On 31 July 2009, RaiSat Yoyo became a free-to-air channel on the Tivù Sat satellite platform and was replaced by Nick Jr. on Sky Italia.

On 18 May 2010, when Rai rebranded all its channels, the name RaiSat was extinguished, and the channel changed its name to Rai Yoyo.

In May 2016, the channel stopped broadcasting advertisements on air.

== Logos and identities ==
Rai Yoyo's first logo as RaiSat YoYo from 2006 to 2010

Rai Yoyo's second and previous logo as Rai YoYo from 2010 to 2017

Rai Yoyo's third and current logo as Rai Yoyo since 2017
