= Rai Sport =

- Logo used since 2022
- Country: Italy
- Broadcast area: Italy

Programming
- Language: Italian
- Picture format: 1080i HDTV (downscaled to 16:9 576i for the SDTV feed)

Ownership
- Owner: RAI
- Sister channels: Rai 1 Rai 2 Rai 3 Rai 4 Rai 5 Rai Gulp; Italiana; Rai Movie; Rai News 24; Rai Premium; Rai Storia; Rai Yoyo; Rai Ladinia; Rai Südtirol; Rai Italia

History
- Launched: 1 February 1999; 27 years ago
- Former names: Rai Sport Satellite (1999–2008); Rai Sport Più (2008–2009); Rai Sport + (2009–2010); Rai Sport 1 (2010–2017)

Links
- Website: raisport.rai.it

Availability

Terrestrial
- DTT: Channel 58 (HD)

Streaming media
- RaiPlay: Live streaming (Only in Italy)

Rai Sport HD is an Italian sports TV channel, launched in 1999 by the state-owned RAI television network. It broadcasts Italian and international sports events in Italy on DTT channel 58 on Rai Mux A from HDTV. It is also available on Sky Italia.

On 18 May 2010 a sister channel, Rai Sport 2 was launched. However, the channel closed on 5 February 2017. Rai Sport + HD launched on 14 September 2015, reviving the Rai Sport + brand that was used from 2009 to 2010.

== Logos and identities ==
Rai Sport's first logo, used until 10 May 2008.

Rai Sport's second logo, used from 10 May 2008 to 15 June 2009.

Rai Sport's third logo, used from 15 June 2009 to 7 September 2009.

Rai Sport's fourth logo, used from 7 September 2009 to 18 May 2010.

Rai Sport's fifth logo, used from 18 May 2010 to 5 February 2017.

Rai Sport's sixth logo from 5 February 2017 to 10 April 2017.

Rai Sport's seventh and previous logo, used from 10 April 2017 to 6 June 2022.

Rai Sport's eighth and current logo since 6 June 2022.

== Programming ==
The channel broadcasts three editions of the Tg Sport: the first at 9 am every day, with press review to touchscreen, the second at 2.30 pm from Monday to Saturday, the last at 11.30 pm from Monday to Friday.

A few programmes include:

- Lega Basket Serie A (LBA)
- Campionato Nazionale Primavera
- FIFA Futsal World Cup
- FIFA Futsal Women's World Cup
- I-league
- Serie A
- Italy national under-21
- Lega Pro Prima Divisione
- Lega Pro Seconda Divisione
- Serie D
- I-League
- Coppa Italia Lega Pro
- Coppa Italia Serie D
- Coppa Italia Dilettanti
- Diretta Azzurra
- 90° Minuto Champions
- Magazine Champions
- Magazine Europa
- Magazine Europa Conference
- Sabato Sprint
- A tutta Coppa
- Lega Pro
