= Rai 3 =

Italian TV channel

- Logo used since 2016
- Country: Italy
- Broadcast area: Italy and San Marino, reaching bordering regions via overspill of the Italian terrestrial network
- Headquarters: Rome, Italy

Programming
- Language: Italian
- Picture format: 1080i HDTV (downscaled to 16:9 576i for the SDTV feed)

Ownership
- Owner: RAI
- Sister channels: Rai 1 Rai 2 Rai 4 Rai 5 Rai Gulp; Italiana; Rai Movie; Rai News 24; Rai Premium; Rai Sport; Rai Storia; Rai Yoyo; Rai Ladinia; Rai Südtirol; Rai Italia

History
- Launched: 15 December 1979; 46 years ago
- Former names: Rete 3 (1979–1983); Rai Tre (1983–2010)

Links
- Website: rai.it/rai3

Availability

Terrestrial
- Digital terrestrial television: Channel 3 (HD, listings may vary); Channel 103 (HD)

Streaming media
- RaiPlay: Live streaming (Only in Italy)

Rai 3 (Rai Tre) is an Italian free-to-air television channel owned and operated by state-owned public broadcaster RAI – Radiotelevisione italiana. It was launched on 15 December 1979 and its programming is centred towards cultural and regional programming. It has always been considered the most left-leaning channel of Italian public television. Rai 3 is a direct competitor to La7 and Mediaset's Rete 4.

== History ==
=== Early years ===
RAI's third TV network, one of the goals of the 1975 reforms of the corporation, started broadcasting at 6:30pm on 15 December 1979, after over one year of tests. The inaugural broadcast was introduced by young actress Fabiana Udenio, while Loretta Goggi, though not directly appearing in video, symbolically became the network's "godmother", appearing in the Radiocorriere TV cover in the channel's launch week.

Initially, the signal only reached regional capitals and 45% of the Italian population, which ultimately led to reception problems and poor ratings. The programming initially lasted for approximately three hours a day, with mainly cultural contents such as theatrical performances, operas, investigations and programs of the Dipartamento Scuola Educazione, without the presence of commercial breaks. Subsequently, the duration of programming increased to five or six hours a day and, starting from 7 March 1983, commercial breaks were introduced.

The first director of the network was Giuseppe Rossini, supported by deputy directors Dario Natoli and Ernesto Mazzetti. TG3, the network's news programme, had a single 30-minute evening edition and depended on twenty regional editorial offices, which also acted as terminals for the other television news programs and the radio newspaper. The direction of TG3 was entrusted to Biagio Agnes, assisted by Sandro Curzi and the deputy directors Alberto La Volpe and Orazio Guerra.

Terza Rete (better known as Rete 3) it made extensive use of Magnetic Video Recording (RVM) technology and broadcast ten minutes of national news followed by twenty minutes of regional news. The national editorial team also had two weekly spaces for in-depth analysis and sports, with the collaboration of Cesare Viazzi and Aldo Biscardi. The latter, in 1980, inaugurated the program Il processo del lunedi, the longest-running sports talk show program on Italian television.

On 10 October 1983, the network changed its name to Rai 3 (back then styled RAI TRE), following the birth of Rete 4, to avoid confusions with the network. Contextually, a new logo, a green tetrahedron, was introduced, used until 23 October 2000.

Among the cultural programs broadcast in this period are Delta, dedicated to scientific dissemination, and La magnifica obsessione, a program on the history of cinema hosted by Enrico Ghezzi and Irene Bignardi.

In the entertainment scene, there was L'Orecchiocchio, a musical program for young audiences in the form of a television rotogravure broadcast in the afternoon from Monday to Friday. His strong points were the video clips and the studio recording of Italian and foreign singers and musical groups, both established and emerging. Launched in 1982, L'Orecchiocchio closed its doors in 1986 to give way the following year, in the same time slot, to the program Jeans hosted by Fabio Fazio.

=== The 1988 reform ===
In 1988, following the reform that harmonized the programming of Rai 3 with that of the other two Rai channels, TG3 was divided into two separate newscasts. On the one hand, TG3 became a national bulletin, acquiring the same status as TG1 and TG2; on the other hand, a new autonomous news unit was established, Testata Giornalistica Nazionale (Rai Regione), responsible for managing all the regional journalistic editorial offices, with responsibility for local television news and radio newscasts.

In 1987, with the arrival of Angelo Guglielmi as director, supported by deputy director Stefano Balassone, and Sandro Curzi at the helm of TG3, the management of the network and the news service passed from the Christian Democracy (DC) to the Italian Communist Party (PCI). This change of control occurred in conjunction with the approval of the Berlusconi decree and marked the definitive separation between the national and regional news services.

Under Guglielmi's control, Rai 3 enters a successful period in its history, be it in terms of ratings, thanks to the equiparation with the two other RAI networks, both for the birth of innovative programs and the affirmation of new faces. Among the prominent programs, there was Telefono giallo (1987-1992), presented by Corrado Augias, which investigated the major unsolved news cases; Chi l'ha visto?, on air since 1989 and presented by Donatella Raffai and Paolo Guzzanti, which brought back the format of the Dove sei? segment from Portobello; Fuori orario. Cose (mai) viste, a container of arthouse cinema; Schegge, a late night slot with content from Rai's archive repertory; and Blob, satirical broadcast created by Enrico Ghezzi and Marco Giusti, which edited the television day in an ironic and critical way.

During Guglielmi's management, Rai 3 becomes a laboratory for television satire, launching programs such as La TV delle ragazze, Scusate l'interruzione, Avanzi, Maddecheaò and Tunnel, which made comedians such as Corrado and Sabina Guzzanti, Angela Finocchiaro, Francesca Reggiani, Cinzia Leone and many others famous. Cinico TV, a surreal and cynical broadcast by Ciprì and Maresco, also found space in this context. Piero Chiambretti found his niche with programs such as Va' pensiero, Complimenti per la trasmissione and Il portalettere, which offered pungent comicity, as shown by his famous interview to president Francesco Cossiga during the Tangentopoli scandal.

Rai 3 was also distinguished for its public service output, such as Mi manda Lubrano (later Mi manda Raitre), dedicated to consumer defense and presented by Antonio Lubrano, and Samarcanda (1988-1993), presented by Michele Santoro, followed by Il rosso e il nero and Tempo reale, still presented by Santoro. The network was also a pioneer in truth TV, with programs such as Un giorno in pretura (from 1988), which documented real criminal trials.

On the cultural and informational front, Rai 3 proposed programs in collaboration with Dipartamento Scuola Educazione, such as Il cirolo delle 12, Parlato semplice and various documentaries.

=== The 90s ===
A service program of a psychological genre, in collaboration with the Teatro Stabile di Torino, which Laura Carassai in La Stampa defined as the theatrical-television success of the end of the year, was Da Storia nasce Storia (1991) conceived and presented by Ottavio Rosati with which Rai carries out a project already attempted in the fifties in France with Roberto Rossellini and Jacob Levi Moreno, father of psychodrama. Guglielmi will declare in this regard: «Rosati's program seems like a complicated matter to me, but psychodrama works on TV because it talks about people's lives".

Light entertainment programs such as La piscina with Alba Parietti were also prevalent, appearing in 1991 in the second half of prime time.

In 1993, another successful Rai program begins on this channel, Quelli che... il calcio, which marks the definitive affirmation of Fabio Fazio. With this program, the way of proposing soccer on TV is revolutionized, in a mix between sports analysis and variety; the program was broadcast successfully until spring 1998 and then moved from autumn of the same year to Rai 2, where it was broadcast until 2021.

Another program created during Guglielmi's direction was Ultimo minuto, on Saturday nights between 1993 and 1998 and presented by Simonetta Martone and Maurizio Mannoni: in Italy the broadcast was the forerunner of later programs such as Real TV, Alive, etc. Also, the network hosted Franco and Ciccio's last show with Avanspettacolo, Adriano Celentano's show Svaluation, which totaled over 13 million viewers, and the historic talk Harem hosted by Catherine Spaak, in the meantime the Regional Televideo was created.

== Foreign language programming ==
In the Aosta Valley, Rai 3 broadcasts programmes in French as well as in Valdôtain dialect.

In the Trentino-Alto Adige/Südtirol region, Rai Südtirol timeshares broadcast hours in German with Rai 3 when not broadcasting.

In the Friuli-Venezia Giulia region, Rai 3 BIS (TDD Furlanija Julijska Krajina) is a separate channel which broadcasts daily from 18:40 with a half-hour daily newscast in Slovene, and other shows in Slovene. In accordance with a bilateral cooperation agreement between Italy and Slovenia, Slovene-language shows produced by Rai 3 Bis are also aired on the Slovenian regional television channel TV Koper-Capodistria and on State-owned TV Slovenija 2.

== Current Programmes ==
A few shows include:

- TG3, Rai 3 main news service
- TGR, regional news service
- Doc3
- Quante storie (Rai 3, from 2019)
- Chi l'ha Visto?
- Un Posto al sole (A Place in the Sun) a soap opera airing on Rai 3 since 21 October 1996.
- Vieni via con me
- Glob
- Buongiorno Estate
- UEFA Europa League (one game per matchday live, the possibility of broadcasting all semi-finals due to law 8/99 if at least an Italian team is involved)
- UEFA Europa Conference League (one game per matchday live, the possibility of broadcasting all semi-finals due to law 8/99 if at least an Italian team is involved)

== Past programmes ==
=== Talk shows ===
- Gazebo (2013-2017) (Note: from 3 March 2013 until 19 May 2017. Since 2017, the programme's format has been broadcast on La7, with a new title Propaganda Live.)
- Che tempo che fa, from 15 October 2023 broadcast on Nove, a Television channel edited by Discovery Italia, a Warner Bros. Discovery group division.

=== Films ===
- Il complicato mondo di Nathalie (2024) (Note: This film was broadcast on Rai 3 on 25 July 2024. The English version title of this film is "Jalouse")
- I profumi di madame Walberg (2024) (Note: This film was broadcast on Rai 3 on 27 June 2024. The English version title of this film is "Perfumes".)

=== Information ===
- NewsRoom (2024)
- Mano a mano (2024)

=== Imported ===
- Inspector Gadget
- Melevisione
- Sabrina the Teenage Witch
- Law & Order
- Friends
- Desperate Housewives
- The Defenders
- Total Drama (Season 1-6)
- The Spaghetti Family

== Logos ==
15 December 1979 - 3 October 1983

3 October 1983 – 26 September 1988

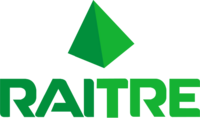
26 September 1988 - 23 October 2000

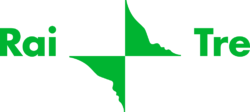
23 October 2000 - 18 May 2010

18 May 2010 - 12 September 2016

HD simulcast (Used from 25 October 2013 - 12 September 2016)

In use since 12 September 2016

HD simulcast (In use since 12 September 2016, but not visible on screen since 15 September 2026, because Rai removed the HD wording from all the Rai channels)
