= Rai Movie =

Italian free-to-air movie channel

- Logo used since 2017
- Country: Italy
- Broadcast area: Italy
- Headquarters: Rome, Italy

Programming
- Languages: Italian; English (with Italian subtitles)
- Picture format: 1080i HDTV (downscaled to 16:9 576i for the SDTV feed)

Ownership
- Owner: RAI
- Sister channels: Rai 1 Rai 2 Rai 3 Rai 4 Rai 5 Rai Gulp; Italiana; Rai News 24; Rai Premium; Rai Sport; Rai Storia; Rai Yoyo; Rai Ladinia; Rai Südtirol; Rai Italia

History
- Launched: 1 July 1999; 27 years ago
- Former names: RaiSat Cinema (1999–2003, 2006–2010); RaiSat Cinema World (2003–2006)

Links
- Website: rai.it/raimovie

Availability

Terrestrial
- Digital: Channel 24 (HD)

Streaming media
- RaiPlay: Live streaming (Only in Italy)

Rai Movie is an Italian movie television channel, owned by state-owned television network RAI and broadcast on digital terrestrial television in Italy and on satellite platform Tivù Sat.

The channel was launched in 2003 as RaiSat Cinema World and re-badged in 2006 as RaiSat Cinema. On 30 June 2009, RaiSat Cinema was removed from Sky and was launched in the new free-to-view satellite platform Tivùsat. On 18 May 2010, it was renamed Rai Movie. It broadcasts mostly Italian films, interviews, backstages and documentaries.

Since 2003 it has been the official media partner of the Venice Film Festival and since 2007 of the Rome Film Festival.

In April 2019, RAI announced that this channel, along with Rai Premium, would shut down to make place for a new channel called Rai 6, with a female target. This sparked controversy and an online petition that quickly reached 120,000 signatures. However, the scheduled date for the shutdown is unknown to this day.

== Films ==
=== Comedy, Family ===
- Al posto tuo

=== Drama, Fantasy, Biografic, Romantic, Musical ===
- Call Me by Your Name
- The Bookshop

== Logos ==
1999–2003 (as RaiSat Cinema)	2003–2006 (as RaiSat Cinema World)	2006–2010 (as RaiSat Cinema)	2010–2017 (as Rai Movie)	2017–present
