= Rai 5 =

Italian television channel

- Logo used since 2017
- Country: Italy
- Broadcast area: Italy and San Marino, reaching bordering regions via overspill of the Italian terrestrial network
- Headquarters: Rome, Italy

Programming
- Language: Italian
- Picture format: 1080i HDTV (downscaled to 16:9 576i for the SDTV feed)

Ownership
- Owner: RAI
- Sister channels: Rai 1 Rai 2 Rai 3 Rai 4 Rai Gulp; Italiana; Rai Movie; Rai News 24; Rai Premium; Rai Sport; Rai Storia; Rai Yoyo; Rai Ladinia; Rai Südtirol; Rai Italia

History
- Launched: 26 November 2010; 15 years ago
- Replaced: Rai Extra

Links
- Website: rai.it/rai5

Availability

Terrestrial
- Digital terrestrial television: Channel 23 (SD)

Streaming media
- RaiPlay: Live streaming (Italy only)

Rai 5 (Rai Cinque) is an Italian free-to-air television channel owned and operated by state-owned public broadcaster RAI – Radiotelevisione italiana. It was launched on 26 November 2010 replacing Rai Extra. Its programming deals with culture with a particular attention to the arts world, offering documentaries, reportages and highbrow entertainment (music, dance, cabaret and theatre).

== Logos ==
2010–2017

2017–present

== Eurovision Song Contest ==
Between 2011 and 2013, Rai 5 aired the Eurovision Song Contest's semi-final that included Italy among the voting countries.

== Programmes ==
- Paradisi da salvare (2023)
