= Rai Südtirol (TV channel) =

- Logo used since 2019
- Country: Italy
- Broadcast area: South Tyrol

Programming
- Picture format: 1080i HDTV (downscaled to 16:9 576i for the SDTV feed)

Ownership
- Owner: RAI
- Sister channels: Rai 1 Rai 2 Rai 3 Rai 4 Rai 5 Italiana; Rai Movie; Rai News 24; Rai Premium; Rai Sport; Rai Storia; Rai Yoyo; Rai Ladinia; Rai Radio Tutta Italiana; Rai Italia

History
- Launched: 7 February 1966; 60 years ago
- Former names: Rai Sender Bozen (1996–2010); Rai Bozen (2010–2014)

Links
- Website: raisudtirol.rai.it (Italian) raisudtirol.rai.it (German)

Rai Südtirol (lit. transl. Rai South Tyrol) is an Italian free-to-air regional television channel owned by state-owned public broadcaster RAI – Radiotelevisione italiana and operated by RAI's South Tyrolean service. It is the company's German and Ladin languages television channel aimed at the German-speaking public of South Tyrol and the Ladin-speaking population of Ladinia. It was launched on 7 February 1966, it broadcast from its studios in Bolzano and unlike all other RAI channels, it carries no commercials.

== History ==
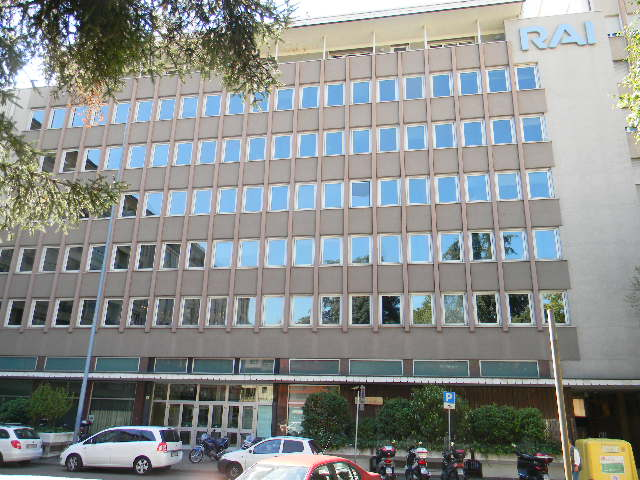
The headquarters of the RAI in Bolzano

Transmissions began on 7 February 1966 as Rai Sender Bozen. Programming initially occupied just one hour daily, the broadcast was carried out from Teatro Cristallo in Bolzano and aired on the local frequencies of Rete 2 (today's Rai 2) between 20.00 and 21.00.

In this period the provincial autonomy was still far from being achieved; South Tyrol was affected by the attacks of secessionist terrorist groups. In such a climate, the concession by the Italian government of a programme in German, when other requests are not satisfied, was seen by South Tyrolean politics as the imposition of a pro-government instrument of control. One of the reasons for setting up the channel was also to push towards the cessation of attempts to receive Austrian and German-speaking television programmes in general, a faculty invoked by the SVP. Therefore, on the occasion of the launch of the programs, the president of the Provincial Council of Bolzano and father of provincial autonomy Silvius Magnago, in open controversy with the choice, refused to leave a message on the German-speaking RAI; to replace him, the bishop of Bolzano-Bressanone, Msgr. Joseph Gargitter.

On 15 December 1979, with the birth of the third network, Rai Sender Bozen began broadcasting on its own dedicated channel. At the same time, a "bis network" was created, a fourth channel relaying Rai 3 when Sender Bozen wasn't broadcasting, with the aim of airing the German output without blocking the Italian output of the channel.

In 2013, the channel officially assumed the new name of Rai Südtirol and the number of hours of the entire television programming was increased.

== Weekly airtime ==
Unlike other RAI channels, Rai Südtirol does not broadcast 24/7. Instead, programming from Rai Südtirol and Rai Ladinia are broadcast in the evening. Outside its operation hours, the channel's frequencies are used by Rai 3.

Day	Start	End	Total hours
Monday	18.00	22.30	4h 30 mins
Tuesday	20.00	22.30	2h 30 mins
Wednesday	20.00	22.30	2h 30 mins
Thursday	20.00	23.00	3h
Friday	18.00	22.30	4h 30 mins
Saturday	18.00	23.00	5h
Sunday	20.00	22.30	2h 30 mins

== Logos ==
2010–2014 (as Rai Bozen)

2014–2019

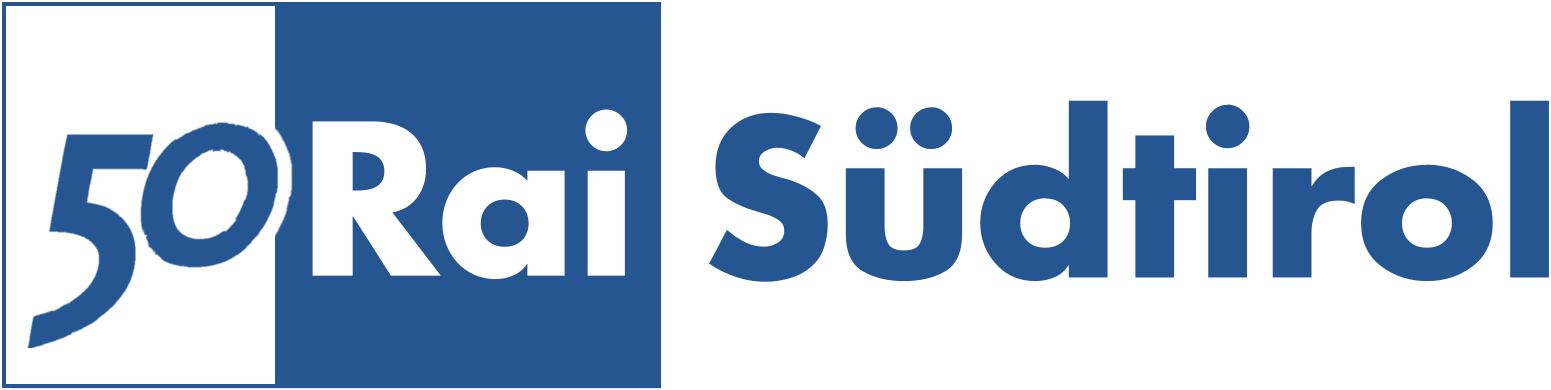
50th anniversary (2016)

2019–present

== See also ==
- Tagesschau, the daily newscast.
