= Rai Ladinia =

Ladin-language broadcaster

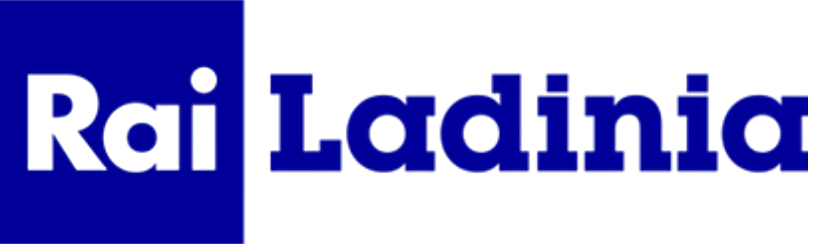
- Logo used since 2019
- Country: Italy
- Broadcast area: Trentino-Alto Adige/Südtirol, Veneto

Programming
- Language: Ladin
- Picture format: 1080i HDTV (downscaled to 16:9 576i for the SDTV feed)

Ownership
- Owner: RAI
- Sister channels: Rai 1 Rai 2 Rai 3 Rai 4 Rai 5 Italiana; Rai Movie; Rai News 24; Rai Premium; Rai Sport; Rai Storia; Rai Yoyo; Rai Südtirol; Rai Italia

History
- Launched: 26 September 1988; 38 years ago
- Former names: Rai Radio TV Ladinia (1988–2010); Rai Tvl (2010–2014)

Links
- Website: Rai Ladinia

Rai Ladinia is a Ladin-language radio and television service broadcasting to people in Ladinia. The service is owned by RAI, the public broadcaster of Italy.

== History ==
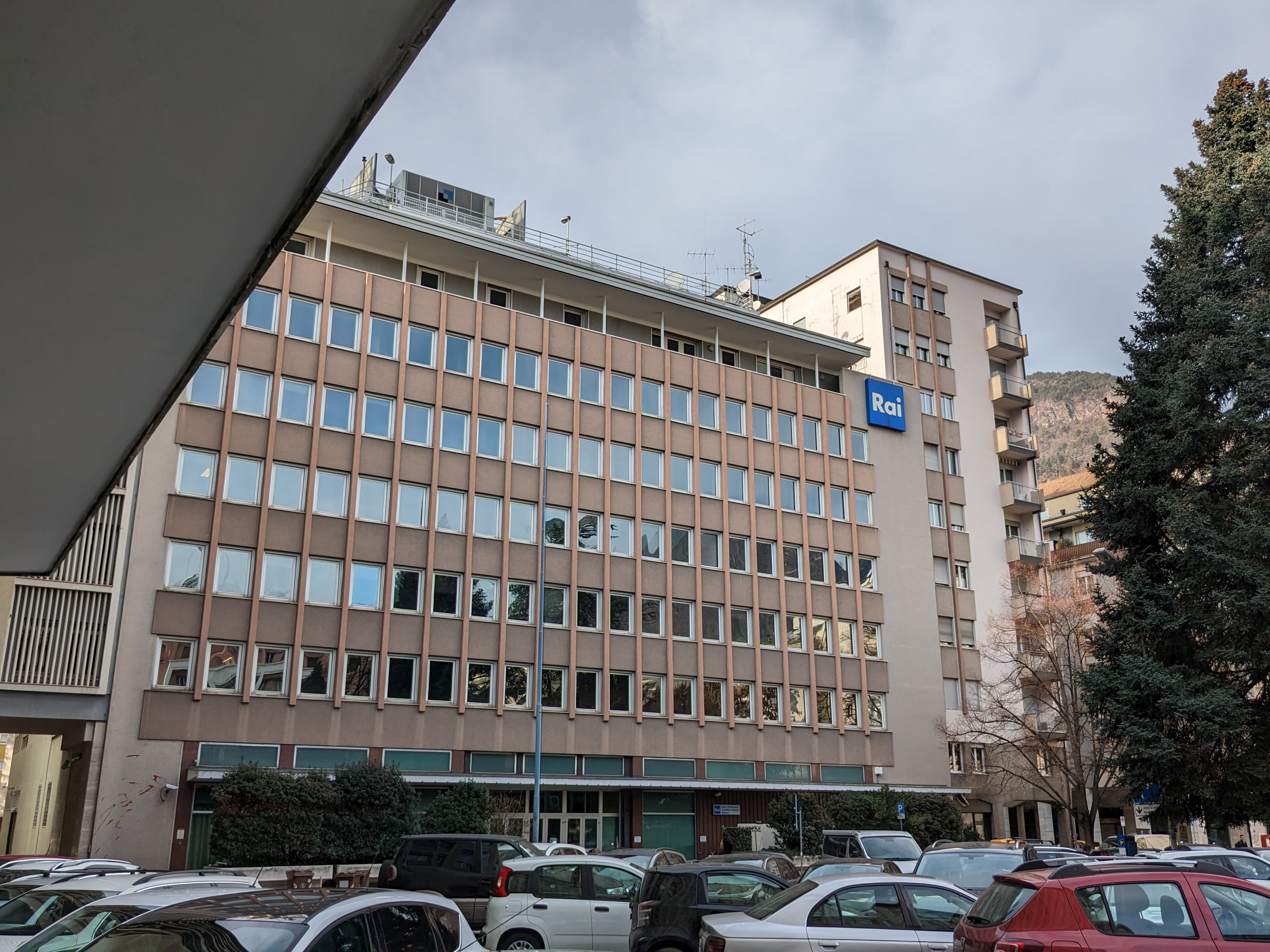
The RAI headquarters in Bolzano

The first Ladin-language radio broadcast from the RAI Bolzano station aired on 4 April 1946. Programming remained sporadic and occasional until 1958, when an initial schedule covering six days a week was established. Television broadcasts began on an experimental basis in 1976 through the initiative of journalists Carl Insam and Erwin Frenes.

In 1987, radio and television programming was entrusted to a specific internal structure within the Bolzano station called Radio TV Ladina. This was established following an agreement between RAI and the Council of Ministers with the mission of producing programs to serve the Ladin linguistic minority, while simultaneously highlighting their existence to citizens of other ethnic groups in the Trentino-Alto Adige/Südtirol region.

Although this agreement only officially covered minorities residing within the provinces of Bolzano and Trento, the historic Ladin communities of Cortina d'Ampezzo, Livinallongo del Col di Lana, and Colle Santa Lucia (united in the "Consulta Ladina") also expressed interest in receiving the station's broadcasts. Since 1996, these municipal administrations have installed a network of radio links and repeaters at their own expense—following the resolution of significant bureaucratic hurdles—to ensure television and radio coverage in their territories, implementing all necessary and costly technological upgrades over time.

The total hours of programming were initially very limited and integrated into the schedules of the German-language station Rai Südtirol, with which it shares transmission channels. This output has gradually increased over the years: in 1996, the first Ladin-language news program was launched, titled TRaiL. It was broadcast as a single 4-minute edition at 7:55 pm, with its editorial staff originally associated with the Testata Giornalistica Regionale (Regional News Desk).

In 2013, the department was renamed Rai Ladinia to reflect a broader focus on the entire Ladinia territory. Daily broadcasting hours were further increased, including the establishment of a second daily edition of the TRaiL news program, whose editorial team became independent from the Italian news desk. Simultaneously, television production was fully digitalized and transitioned to the 16:9 aspect ratio.

== Logos and identities ==
Rai Ladinia's first logo, used until 16 March 2000.

Rai Ladinia's third logo, used from 2010 to 2014.

Rai Ladinia's fourth and previous logo, used from 2014 to 2019.

Rai Ladinia's fifth and current logo used since 2019.
