= Tagesschau (Italian TV programme) =

- Starring: Gunda Regensberger; Jimmy Nussbaumer; Kerstin Abram; Krista Romen; Peter Malfertheiner, Sports; Roland Turk; Silvia Franceschini; Ulrieke van den Driesch, Sports; Zeno Braitenberg
- Country of origin: Italy
- Original language: German
- No. of episodes: N/A (airs daily)

Production
- Running time: about 20 minutes

Original release
- Network: Rai Südtirol
- Release: 7 February 1966 – present

Tagesschau (English: View on the Day) is the title of a news broadcast on Rai Südtirol, RAI's German language television channel in the province of South Tyrol. The program has been broadcast since the channel was launched on 7 February 1966, although its editorial staff was based in Rome until 1992.

The main and first edition is broadcast at 8PM and the second and last edition, added in the 1990s, is broadcast at 10:10PM and is called Tagesschau um 10 nach 10 (Tagesschau at 10 past 10). The Tagesschau covers local, national and international news.

== Format ==
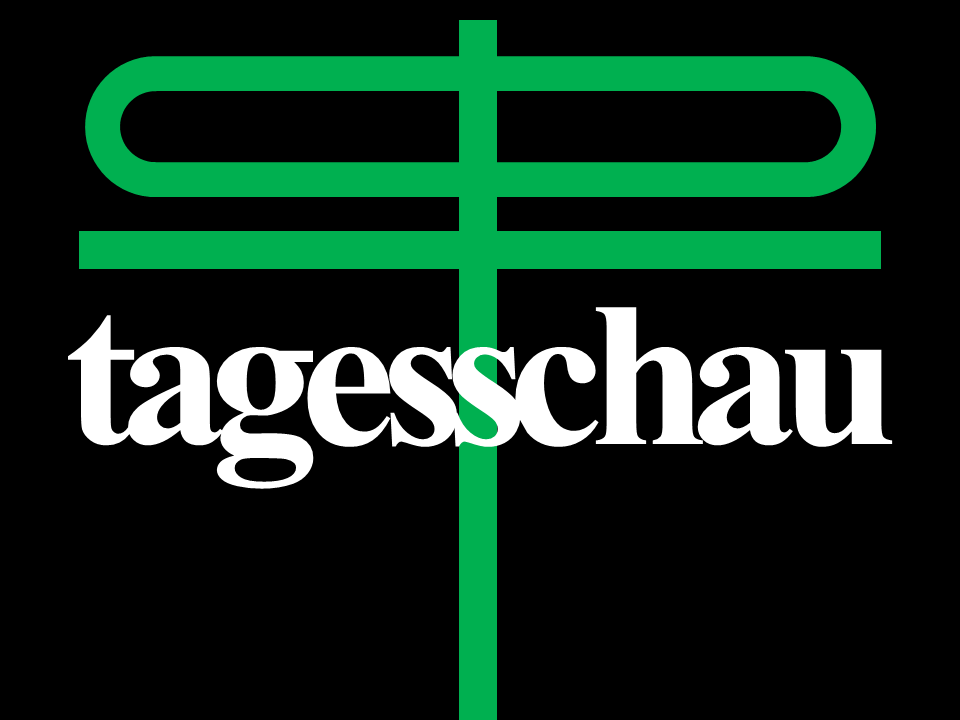
Third logo (1980–1988)

Eighth logo (1998–2014)

The Tagesschau open jingle begins with the first notes of the Bozner Bergsteigerlied. The headlines include the three most considerable news of the day. The two editions are broadcast from the same studio in the RAI broadcasting house in Bolzano and are both hosted by the same presenter. Four presenters alternately host the newscast.

The Tagesschau team covers news directly from South Tyrol, including specific issues concerning neighbouring regions and from Rome for national politics, where a correspondent is located. Reports over other current events from Italy or news from Europe and the World are recorded by the Tagesschau team in Bolzano using pictures from Italian RAI newscasts or from the EBU Network.

The last broadcast edition can also be watched in full as a video stream from the RAI Sender Bozen web page.

=== Tagesschau at 8PM ===
The main edition is the highest rated television programme in the province and normally covers news from Italy (mainly national politics), Europe and the world in the first part (about 5–7 minutes), while news from South Tyrol are in the second part of the newscast. If a special event in the province occurs, local reporting will come first. Monday to Saturday newscasts include sports reports in the final part of the newscast (about 2–3 minutes) before the weather forecast, which is the last report in the Tagesschau.

=== Tagesschau at 10:10PM ===
The last edition follows a different schedule, covering local news at first (about 13–15 minutes), while the news from Italy, Europe and the World are in the second part. Every day sports news are covered in the final part of the show before the weather forecast. Normally in both editions non-local news are covered throughout a report on a specific issue, followed by news in brief.

=== Weather forecast ===
The weather forecast concerns only the province. On Friday the weather forecast for the week-end is presented by a meteorologist of the Provincial Hydrographic Department from his/her office; on other days a satellite map of South Tyrol is shown, while a reporter reads the Hydrographic Department weather bulletin. The weather report includes the current meteorological situation in Central Europe, a map of the province with the forecast for the next day, a map with the temperature forecast in the main cities and a forecast for the next three days.
