= Rai Premium =

- Logo used since 2017
- Country: Italy

Programming
- Language: Italian
- Picture format: 1080i HDTV (downscaled to 16:9 576i for the SDTV feed)

Ownership
- Owner: RAI
- Sister channels: Rai 1 Rai 2 Rai 3 Rai 4 Rai 5 Rai Gulp; Italiana; Rai Movie; Rai News 24; Rai Sport; Rai Storia; Rai Yoyo; Rai Ladinia; Rai Südtirol; Rai Italia

History
- Launched: 2 April 1997; 29 years ago
- Former names: RaiSat Prem1um (2003–2010)

Links
- Website: rai.it/raipremium

Availability

Terrestrial
- Digital terrestrial television: Channel 25 (SD)

Streaming media
- RaiPlay: Live streaming (Only in Italy)

Rai Premium is an Italian free-to-air television channel that broadcasts reruns of popular fiction and films that were produced by state-owned broadcaster RAI.

An international version, Rai World Premium, exists, with the channel in 2022 drawing from a catalog of 2,750 hours worth of Rai Fiction and 156 hours worth of Rai Cinema's productions.

== TV Series ==
- Butta la luna
- Che Dio ci aiuti
- Incantesimo
- Un posto al sole
- A Million Little Things

== Logos ==
2003–2010 (as RaiSat Prem1um)	2010–2017 (as Rai Premium)	2017–present
