= Signal overspill =

Reception of broadcast signals outside a target area

Signal overspill is the receiving of a broadcast signal outside of its geographical target area. Radio frequencies have no way of obeying geographical borders and licensing arrangements, and the extent of overspill depends on where broadcast transmitters are sited and their power. In addition to traditional transmitters, overspill occurs when the footprint of a satellite is greater than that needed to serve its target audience.

Transmitters located near to international borders may overspill into a large part of a neighbouring country, for example the signal from Republic of Ireland broadcaster 2RN's Clermont Carn site can be picked up in a large swathe of Northern Ireland, and vice versa BBC broadcasts can be picked up in the Republic. Another example is signal overspill within the Indonesia–Malaysia–Singapore growth triangle.

Overspill is usually welcomed by listeners and viewers as it gives them additional choices. For example, when the Republic of Ireland began to migrate its television broadcasts to a digital platform, measures were put in place so that viewers in Northern Ireland could continue to receive the channels they had become used to. However, legally and often politically overspill can be unwelcome. Broadcast rights are sold on a per territory basis, and overspill can be seen as harmful to the commercial and intellectual property rights of creators.

Politically some governments may be wary of their own populace becoming too familiar with the culture of a neighbouring country or territory and feel threatened by it. For example, in China prior to its reforms, television dramas from Hong Kong could be easily picked up in neighbouring Guangdong, and helped spread the desire for greater liberty and material goods in Guangdong. Cross border radio and television reception was an important influence on political developments in Germany during the Cold War. North Korea, on the other hand, completely outlaws reception of signals from outside the country.

Overspill may have an accidental soft power effect, for example for many years listeners in the Netherlands were able to pick up BBC radio signals, listeners wanting to learn English would tune into the BBC leading to a British cultural influence on the Netherlands. Some nations will purposefully site transmitters and broadcast at a higher power than strictly necessary as a purposeful exercise in soft power. With regards to television, countries wishing to prevent this will choose a television encoding system incompatible to that of its neighbours.

Overspill is used as a cover by stations, such as those known as border blaster and those of the radio périphérique, where the audience supposedly accidentally receiving a broadcast is actually the intended audience. The transmitters used are positioned and are very much more powerful than that needed to serve their licensed audience.

== See also ==
- Rimshot (broadcasting)
