= List of television channels in Italy =

This is a list of national Italian TV services available on digital terrestrial, satellite, cable systems in Italy. Some channels have a "timeshift" service, i.e. the same programming (and usually advertisements as well) broadcast one or two hours later to give viewers another chance to catch a favourite programme. On free satellite, as well as on Sky Italia, foreign channels are also available, such as Euronews, CNN International, etc. For Italian-speaking channels not based in Italy, or not having studios in Italy, please see the link above this paragraph.

== National networks ==
=== RAI ===
Logo	Name	Type	Launched	Broadcast hours	Description
Terrestrial channel
	Rai 1	Free-to-air	3 January 1954	24 hours	Generalist and family-oriented
	Rai 2	Free-to-air	4 November 1961	24 hours	Generalist, catering towards urban audiences
	Rai 3	Free-to-air	15 December 1979	24 hours	Cultural and regional programming
	Rai 4	Free-to-air	14 July 2008	24 hours	Youth/urban programming and movies
	Rai 5	Free-to-air	26 November 2010	24 hours	Arts and culture programming
	Rai 4K	Free-to-air	17 June 2016	may vary	Ultra HD (4K) channel
	Rai Movie	Free-to-air	1 July 1999	24 hours	Movies
	Rai Premium	Free-to-air	31 July 2003	24 hours	Popular fiction and films
	Rai Gulp	Free-to-air	1 June 2007	24 hours	Shows aimed at young children ages 8–14
	Rai Yoyo	Free-to-air	1 November 2006	24 hours	Shows aimed at young children ages 4–7
	Rai News 24	Free-to-air	26 April 1999	24 hours	Non-stop rolling news
	Rai Storia	Free-to-air	2 February 2009	24 hours	Documentaries about history and culture
	Rai Sport	Free-to-air	14 September 2015	24 hours	Sports coverage and related news
	Italiana	Free-to-air	1 October 2026	24 hours	Documentary, cultural and cuisine
	Rai Radio 2 Visual	Free-to-air	28 September 2020	24 hours	Radio broadcast, news and music

==== RAI Regional ====
Logo	Name	Launched	Language	Region
	Rai Alto Adige	1960	Italian	Trentino-Alto Adige/Südtirol
	Rai Ladinia	1988	Ladin	Trentino-Alto Adige/Südtirol
	Rai Südtirol	1966	German	Trentino-Alto Adige/Südtirol
	Rai 3 BIS FJK	1995	Italian and Slovene	Friuli Venezia Giulia/Furlanija Julijska Krajina

=== Mediaset ===
Logo	Name	Type	Launched	Broadcast hours	Description
Terrestrial channel
	Rete 4	Free-to-air	4 January 1982	24 hours	General
	Canale 5	Free-to-air	11 November 1980	24 hours	General
	Italia 1	Free-to-air	3 January 1982	24 hours	General
	20	Free-to-air	3 April 2018	24 hours	TV Series and Sports
	Iris	Free-to-air	30 November 2007	24 hours	Movies
	Twentyseven	Free-to-air	17 January 2022	24 hours	Cinema
	La5	Free-to-air	12 March 2010	24 hours	Entertainment and lifestyle
	Cine34	Free-to-air	20 January 2020	24 hours	Cinema
	Focus	Free-to-air	17 March 2018	24 hours	Documentaries
	Top Crime	Free-to-air	12 March 2004	24 hours	Entertainment
	Italia 2	Free-to-air	4 July 2011	24 hours	Entertainment and sports
	TGcom24	Free-to-air	28 November 2011	24 hours	Non-stop rolling news
	Mediaset Extra	Free-to-air	26 November 2010	24 hours	General
	Radio 105 TV	Free-to-air	23 December 2019	24 hours	Radio broadcast, news and music
	R101 TV	Free-to-air	13 July 2015	24 hours	Radio broadcast, news and music
	Radio Monte Carlo TV	Free-to-view	10 April 2020	24 hours	Radio broadcast, news and music
	Virgin Radio TV	Free-to-view	6 November 2018	24 hours	Radio broadcast, news and music

=== Boing S.p.A. ===
Logo	Name	Type	Launched	Broadcast hours	Description
Terrestrial channel
	Boing	Free-to-air	20 November 2004	24 hours	Shows aimed at young children ages 8–14
	K2	Free-to-air	1 July 2009	01:00 – 22:00	Shows aimed at young children ages 8–14
	Boing Plus	Free-to-air	11 July 2019	24 hours	Shows aimed at young children ages 8–14
	Frisbee	Free-to-air	12 June 2010	01:00 – 22:00	Shows aimed at young children ages 4–7
	Cartoonito	Free-to-air	22 August 2011	24 hours	Shows aimed at young children ages 4–7

=== Cairo Communication ===
Logo	Name	Type	Launched	Broadcast hours	Description
Terrestrial channel
	La7	Free-to-air	24 June 2001	24 hours	General
	La7 Cinema	Free-to-air	1 October 2025	24 hours	Cinema

=== Sky Italia ===
Logo	Name	Type	Launched	Broadcast hours	Description
Terrestrial channel
	TV8	Free-to-air	1 August 2015	24 hours	General
	Cielo	Free-to-air	16 December 2009	24 hours	Entertainment, sports and movies
	Sky TG24	Free-to-air	31 August 2003	24 hours	Non-stop rolling news

=== Discovery Italia ===
Logo	Name	Type	Launched	Broadcast hours	Availability	Description	Notes
Terrestrial channel
	Nove	Free-to-air	1 February 2015	24 hours	Tivùsat and FTV satellite (HD, SD); DTT (HD); Sky Italia (HD)	General	
	Real Time	Free-to-air	1 October 2005	24 hours	Tivùsat (HD); DTT (HD); Sky Italia (HD)	Lifestyle	
	Food Network	Free-to-air	8 May 2015	24 hours	Tivùsat; DTT; Sky Italia	Cooking and cuisine	
	Discovery	Free-to-air	1 September 1997	24 hours	Tivùsat; DTT; Sky Italia	Documentaries	
	Giallo	Free-to-air	14 May 2012	24 hours	Tivùsat; DTT; Sky Italia	Entertainment	
	DMAX	Free-to-air	10 November 2011	24 hours	Tivùsat; DTT; Sky Italia	Entertainment	
	HGTV	Free-to-air	2 February 2020	24 hours	Tivùsat; DTT; Sky Italia	Lifestyle	
	Discovery Turbo	Free-to-air	29 April 2018	24 hours	Tivùsat; DTT; Sky Italia	Automotive	

=== De Agostini ===
Logo	Name	Type	Launched	Broadcast hours	Availability	Description
Terrestrial channel
	Super!	Free-to-air	1 September 2010	24 hours	DTT; Tivùsat; Sky Italia	Shows aimed at young children ages 8–14

== National premium channels ==
=== Sky Italia ===
Logo	Name	Type	Launched	Broadcast hours	Description
Premium channel
	Sky Uno	Pay	1 April 2009	24 hours	Entertainment
	Sky Cinema Uno	Pay	31 July 2003	24 hours	Movies
	Sky Atlantic	Pay	9 April 2014	24 hours	TV Series
	Sky Serie	Pay	1 July 2021	24 hours	TV Series
	Sky Investigation	Pay	1 July 2021	24 hours	TV Series about crime
	Sky Collection	Pay	1 November 2025	24 hours	TV Series about collections
	Sky Crime	Pay	1 November 2023	24 hours	Documentaries about crime
	History	Pay	31 July 2003	24 hours	Documentaries about history
	Sky Documentaries	Pay	1 July 2021	24 hours	Documentaries
	Sky Voices	Pay	2 November 2026	24 hours	Video podcast
	Sky Adventure	Pay	1 July 2025	24 hours	Documentaries about adventure
	Sky Nature	Pay	1 July 2021	24 hours	Documentaries about nature
	Sky Arte	Pay	1 November 2012	24 hours	Documentaries about arts and culture
	Sky Classica	Pay	10 October 2013	24 hours	Classical music
	Sky Sport 24	Pay	30 August 2008	24 hours	Sports news
	Sky Sport Uno	Pay	1 July 2003	24 hours	Sports
	Sky Sport Calcio	Pay	2 July 2018	24 hours	Football (soccer)
	Sky Sport Tennis	Pay	28 June 2021	24 hours	Tennis related events
	Sky Sport Arena	Pay	31 June 2003	24 hours	Sports
	Sky Sport Basket	Pay	2 July 2018	24 hours	Basketball related events
	Sky Sport Max	Pay	4 September 2023	24 hours	Sports
	Sky Sport F1	Pay	2 July 2018	24 hours	F1 related events
	Sky Sport MotoGP	Pay	2 July 2018	24 hours	MotoGP related events
	Sky Sport Golf	Pay	2 July 2018	24 hours	Golf related events
	Sky Sport Legend	Pay	1 July 2025	24 hours	Sports
	Sky Sport Mix	Pay	1 July 2025	24 hours	Sports
	Sky Sport 4K	Pay	20 August 2021	24 hours	Sports in Ultra HD (4K)
	Sky Cinema Stories	Pay	7 December 2025	24 hours	Movies
	Sky Cinema Collection	Pay	1 March 2008	24 hours	Movies dedicated to film reviews and collections/ franchises and night oscars live coverage
	Sky Cinema Family	Pay	20 December 2008	24 hours	Movies dedicated to comedies, animated films, teen-comedies, blockbusters and films from the eighties and nineties
	Sky Cinema Action	Pay	20 July 2009	24 hours	Movies dedicated to action
	Sky Cinema Suspense	Pay	8 March 2019	24 hours	Movies dedicated to thriller, crime, horror and noir films
	Sky Cinema Romance	Pay	11 March 2011	24 hours	Movies dedicated to love, romance and passion
	Sky Cinema Drama	Pay	8 March 2019	24 hours	Movies dedicated to dramas and biographies
	Sky Cinema Comedy	Pay	1 March 2011	24 hours	Movies dedicated to comedies
	Sky TG24 Primo Piano	Pay	8 November 2010	24 hours	Live event, news
	Sky Meteo 24	Pay	1 August 2004	24 hours	Weather news forecasts

=== Discovery Italia ===
==== Turner Broadcasting System ====
Logo	Name	Type	Launched	Broadcast hours	Availability	Description
Premium channel
	Cartoon Network	Pay	31 July 1996	24 hours	Sky Italia (HD)	Shows aimed at young children ages 8–14
	Boomerang	Pay	31 July 2003	24 hours	Sky Italia (HD)	Shows aimed at young children ages 4–7

=== Paramount ===
Logo	Name	Type	Launched	Broadcast hours	Availability	Description
Premium channel
	Comedy Central	Pay	1 May 2007	24 hours	Sky Italia (SD)	Entertainment
	MTV	Pay	1 September 1997	24 hours	Sky Italia	Entertainment
	Nick Jr.	Pay	31 July 2009	24 hours	Sky Italia (SD)	Shows aimed at young children ages 4–7
	Nickelodeon	Pay	1 November 2004	24 hours	Sky Italia (SD)	Shows aimed at young children ages 8–14

=== The Walt Disney Company Italy ===
Logo	Name	Type	Launched	Broadcast hours	Availability	Description
Premium channel
	Disney Jr.	Pay	1 December 2025	24 hours	Sky Italia	Shows aimed at young children ages 4–7

== Streaming premium channels ==
=== Discovery Italia ===
Logo	Name	Launched	Broadcast hours	Availability	Description
Premium channel
	Eurosport 1	5 February 1989	24 Hours	Discovery+; HBO Max; TIMvision; DAZN	Sports
	Eurosport 2	10 January 2005	24 Hours	Discovery+; HBO Max; TIMvision; DAZN	Sports

== Others ==
Channel name	Owner/parent company	Broadcast hours	Format	Availability	Content
7 Gold	Italia 7 Gold	24 hours	16:9 SDTV	DTT	General
AB Channel	Promosat S.r.l.	24 hours	4:3 SDTV	FTA satellite; local DTT	General
Alice	Alma Media	24 hours	16:9 SDTV	FTA satellite; DTT	Cooking
Antichità Chiossone		24 hours	16:9 SDTV	FTA satellite	Teleshopping (antiques)
BabyFirst	First Media	24 hours	16:9 HDTV	FTA satellite	Children
Bike Channel	Filmedia	24 hours	16:9 SDTV	Sky Italia	Sports
Byoblu	Byoblu Edizioni S.r.l.s	24 hours	16:9 SDTV	Sky Italia; Tivùsat; DTT	News; Documentaries
Caccia	Digicast	24 hours	16:9 SDTV	Sky Italia	Hunting
Cagnola	Cagnola	24 hours	16:9 SDTV	FTA satellite	Teleshopping
Camera dei Deputati	Chamber of Deputies	24 hours	16:9 HDTV	FTA satellite	Politics; Lives from Italian lower House
Canale 65	GM Comunicazione	24 hours	16:9 SDTV	DTT	Teleshopping
Canale Italia 2	Canale Italia	24 hours	4:3 SDTV	DTT	General
Canale Italia 83	Canale Italia	24 hours	4:3 SDTV	FTA satellite; DTT	General; Music
Canale Italia 84	Canale Italia	24 hours	4:3 SDTV	FTA satellite; DTT	General
Case Design Stili	Alma Media	24 hours	16:9 SDTV	DTT	Lifestyle
Channel 24	Gold TV Italia	24 hours	16:9 SDTV	DTT	Teleshopping
Città Italia	DWT	24 hours	16:9 SDTV	FTA satellite	Lifestyle
Class CNBC	Class Editori; Versant; Mediaset	24 hours	16:9 HDTV	Sky Italia	Business
Class TV Moda	Class Editori	24 hours	16:9 HDTV	FTA satellite	Lifestyle
DAZN 1	DAZN Group	24 hours	16:9 HDTV	FTA satellite, Sky Italia	Sports
DAZN 2	DAZN Group	24 hours	16:9 HDTV	FTA satellite, Sky Italia	Sports
DAZN 3	DAZN Group	24 hours	16:9 HDTV	Sky Italia	Sports
DeA Junior	De Agostini	24 hours	16:9 HDTV	Sky Italia	Family
DeA Kids	De Agostini	24 hours	16:9 HDTV	Sky Italia	Family
Deejay TV	GEDI Gruppo Editoriale	24 hours	16:9 HDTV	DTT	Music
Doctor's Life Channel		24 hours	16:9 SDTV	Sky Italia	Health; Documentaries
Donna TV	Filmedia	24 hours	16:9 HDTV	DTT	Lifestyle
Elite Shopping		24 hours	16:9 SDTV	FTA satellite	Teleshopping
Gambero Rosso Channel (HD)	D. Gusto; Sky Italia	24 hours	16:9 HDTV, SDTV	Sky Italia	Cooking
Gold TV	Gold TV Italia	24 hours	16:9 SDTV	FTA satellite; DTT	Teleshopping
Hip Hop TV	Seven Music Entertainment	24 hours	4:3 SDTV	Sky Italia	Music
Horse TV	Class Editori	24 hours	16:9 SDTV	FTA satellite	Lifestyle; Horse racing
HSE24	Home Shopping Europe	24 hours	16:9 SDTV	FTA satellite (HD); DTT (SD)	Teleshopping
IlSole24Ore TV	Gruppo 24 ORE	24 hours	16:9 HDTV	FTA DTT	News
Inter TV	FC Internazionale Milano	24 hours	16:9 SDTV	Sky Italia	Sports
Italia 53	Canale Italia	24 hours	4:3 SDTV	DTT	Movies; News
Italia +	Gold TV Italia	24 hours	16:9 SDTV	FTA satellite; DTT	Teleshopping
Italia Channel – Mediatext.it	Mediatext.it	24 hours	16:9 SDTV	FTA satellite; DTT	Teleshopping
Italian Fishing TV		24 hours	16:9 SDTV	FTA satellite	Fishing
Juwelo Italia	Juwelo TV Deutschland GmbH	10:00 – 01:00	16:9 SDTV	FTA satellite; DTT	Teleshopping (jewelry)
La 4	Gold TV Italia	24 hours	16:9 SDTV	FTA satellite; DTT	Teleshopping
LaEffe	Giangiacomo Feltrinelli Editore	24 hours	16:9 SDTV	Sky Italia	Culture
Lazio Style Channel	S.S. Lazio	24 hours	16:9 SDTV	Sky Italia	Sports
Man-Ga	Yamato Video	24 hours	16:9 SDTV	Sky Italia	Anime
Marcopolo	Alma Media	24 hours	16:9 SDTV	FTA satellite and DTT	Documentaries; Traveling
Milan TV	Infront Sports & Media	24 hours	16:9 SDTV	Sky Italia	Sports
Muzik TV		24 hours	16:9 SDTV	FTA satellite	Music
Odeon 24	Profit Group	24 hours	16:9 SDTV	DTT	General
Padre Pio TV	Teleradio Padre Pio	08:00 – 01:00	16:9 SDTV	FTA satellite; DTT	Religious
Pesca	Digicast	24 hours	16:9 SDTV	Sky Italia	Fishing
QVC (HD)	QVC Group	24 hours	16:9 HDTV, SDTV	FTA satellite (HD); DTT (SD)	Teleshopping
Radiofreccia TV	RTL 102.5	24 hours	16:9 HDTV and SDTV	FTA satellite (HD, SD); DTT (SD)	Music
Radio Italia TV	Radio Italia S.M.I.	24 hours	16:9 HDTV, SDTV	FTA satellite (HD); DTT (SD, HD)	Music
Radio Kiss Kiss TV	Radio Kiss Kiss	24 hours	16:9 HDTV	FTA satellite (HD); DTT (HD)	Music
Radionorba TV	Gruppo Norba	24 hours	16:9 SDTV	FTA satellite, local DTT	Music
Radio Zeta TV	RTL 102.5	24 hours	16:9 HDTV and SDTV	FTA satellite (HD, SD); DTT (SD)	Music
RDS Social TV		24 hours	16:9 HDTV	FTA satellite (HD); DTT (HD)	Music
Retecapri	Television Broadcasting System	24 hours	16:9 SDTV	FTA satellite; DTT	General
Reteconomy	Reteconomy	24 hours	16:9 SDTV	FTA satellite	Business
RTL 102.5 TV	RTL 102.5	24 hours	16:9 HDTV and SDTV	FTA satellite (HD, SD); DTT (SD)	Music
Senato della Repubblica	Senate of the Republic	24 hours	16:9 HDTV	FTA satellite	Politics; Lives from Italian upper House
Sportitalia	Sportitalia	24 hours	16:9 HDTV	Sky Italia; DTT	Sports
SuperTennis (HD)	Federazione Italiana Tennis e Padel	24 hours	16:9 HDTV, SDTV	FTA satellite (HD); DTT (SD)	Sports
Telepace (HD)	Telepace; Vatican Media	24 hours	16:9 HDTV, SDTV	FTA satellite (HD); local DTT (SD)	Religious
TG Architettura		24 hours	4:3 SDTV	FTA satellite	Educational
TG Norba 24 (HD)	Gruppo Norba	24 hours	16:9 HDTV, SDTV	FTA satellite (SD); local DTT (HD, SD)	News
Top Calcio 24	Mediapason	02:00 – 19:00	16:9 SDTV	DTT	Football (soccer)
TV2000	Conferenza Episcopale Italiana	24 hours	16:9 SDTV	FTA-FTV satellite; DTT	General; Religious
Uninettuno University TV	UTI UNINETTUNO	24 hours	4:3 SDTV	FTA satellite	Educational
UNIRE Sat	UNIRE	24 hours	16:9 SDTV	FTA satellite	Horse racing

== See also ==
- Television in Italy
- Media of Italy
- List of newspapers in Italy
- List of magazines published in Italy
- List of radio stations in Italy
- History of Italian journalism
- Censorship in Italy
- Telecommunications in Italy
- Internet in Italy
