= Focus (TV channel) =

Italian television channel

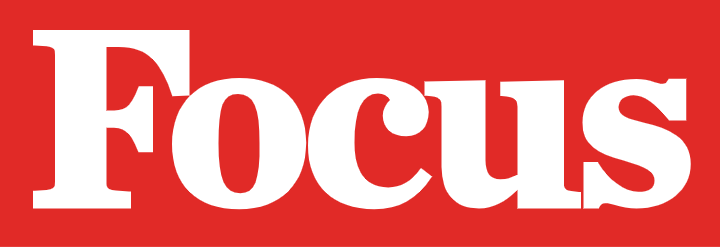
- Country: Italy
- Broadcast area: National

Programming
- Language: Italian
- Picture format: 1080i HDTV

Ownership
- Owner: Switchover Media (2012-2013); Discovery Italia (2013-2018); Mediaset (2018-present)
- Parent: Mediaset (MFE - MediaForEurope)
- Sister channels: Rete 4 Canale 5 Italia 1; 20; Iris; 27 Twentyseven; La5; Cine34; Top Crime; Boing; Boing Plus; Cartoonito; Italia 2 TGcom24; Mediaset Extra

History
- Launched: July 28, 2012; 13 years ago (original); May 17, 2018; 7 years ago (relaunch)
- Replaced: Doc-U
- Closed: April 29, 2018; 8 years ago
- Replaced by: Motor Trend (original)

Availability

Terrestrial
- Digital terrestrial television: Channel 35

Streaming media
- Mediaset Infinity: Focus

Focus is an Italian free television channel operated by Mediaset and owned by MFE - MediaForEurope. Focusing on a mixture of factual and entertainment programming, the network deals with topics of natural sciences, pseudoscience and history, in partnership with the homonymous magazine.

== History ==
=== Switchover Media management (2012–2013) ===
The channel appears at midnight on July 13, 2012 in the form of a promotional sign, replacing Doc-U: broadcasts officially begin at 8:00 on July 28.

The birth of this channel is a license agreement between Switchover Media and Gruner+Jahr/Mondadori, editors of the magazine Focus.

=== Discovery Italia management (2013–2018) ===
With the takeover of Switchover Media, on January 14, 2013 the channel goes to Discovery Italia as well as the other channels published by the same company. Among the effects of this passage are the more popular programs broadcast by other group channels such as Extreme Engineering and How It's Made. From September 15, 2013 the channel will renew its logo and graphics, while from April 9, 2014 it will land on the platform Sky Italia on channel 418.

The old logo.

From January 29, 2015 the channel logo will pass to the top left, being surrounded by a red rectangle with the writing in white and the title of the program will be added to the top right only when it airs, from February 6 of same year, the Discovery logo is added, the same also applies to the other free channels. From July 23 of the same year, he also joined the platform Tivùsat on channel 56.

=== Mediaset management (from 2018) ===
After the end of the agreement between Discovery Italia and Mondadori, on April 29, 2018, Focus ended under the Discovery management and it was replaced by Motor Trend on channel 56, a channel dedicated to engines. In addition, the programs of the old Discovery branded Focus move to DMAX.

On May 14, 2018, the channel was relaunched on channel 35 under the management of Mediaset, with the various promos and previews, instead of Italia 2 (which moved to number 120 and subsequently to 66) and the next day also returns to Tivùsat at number 60. The new Mediaset Focus officially started on May 17 at 9.15 pm with the documentary Un anno nello spazio and from January 2, 2019 it became available again also within the platform Sky Italia to channel 414.
