= Family Club (television block) =

Family Club

Family Club was an Italian TV Block that aired every day from 10:00pm to 1:00am on K2 and Frisbee, airing Discovery-branded documentaries like How It's Made and How Do They Do It?., it ended permanently on August 2nd, 2026 after no longer being owned by Warner Bros. Discovery

== Programming ==
The block's current programming is different on both channels. On K2 it's directed at males with documentaries and has programs taken from its sister channels Motor Trend and Animal Planet, while on Frisbee it's directed at women with shows about food and Home and airs shows from Food Network and HGTV.

=== Current programming ===
- How It's Made
- How Do They Do It?
- Come fanno gli animali
- La mia nuova casetta dei giochi
- Extreme Cake Wars
- Kids Baking Championship

=== Former programming ===
- Just for Laughs Gags
- Wipeout
- WWE Afterburn
- Parrucchieri per cani
