= Italia 2 =

Italian television channel

- Logo used since 2011
- Country: Italy
- Broadcast area: Italy, reaching bordering regions via overspill of the Italian terrestrial network

Programming
- Language: Italian
- Picture format: 1080i HDTV

Ownership
- Owner: Mediaset Italia (MFE - MediaForEurope)
- Sister channels: Italia 1 Rete 4 Canale 5; 20; Iris; 27 Twentyseven; La5; Cine34; Focus; Top Crime; Boing; Boing Plus; Cartoonito; TGcom24; Mediaset Extra

History
- Launched: July 4, 2011

Links
- Website: Italia 2

Availability

Terrestrial
- Digital terrestrial television: Channel 49

Streaming media
- Mediaset Infinity: Italia 2

Mediaset Italia Due, commonly known as Italia 2 (pronounced Italia Due [iˈtaːlja ˈduːe]), is an Italian television channel, operated by Mediaset and owned by MFE - MediaForEurope. It was founded, and started to broadcast, in 2011.

Italia 2 currently broadcasts in Italian. It broadcasts at a national level and also serves to target Italian youth, aimed primarily at a male audience.

== History ==
On July 1, 2011, Italia 2 started broadcasting its launch spots. On July 4, at 10pm CEST, it officially began broadcasting, with the first viewing of the film Dragonball Evolution.

The peculiarity of the schedule of Italia 2 for the first year consisted in its division into "zones", where each of them has a thematic character; amongst these, worthy of note is the U-Zone, made by the channel's viewers through their amateur videos. The daytime programming of Sunday and Saturday is different from the other days of the week. The first night programs started at 10 pm, then at 9:30 pm, and finally at 9:10 pm, like all Mediaset channels, with TV series and television programs divided into theme evenings.

In 2012, Italia 2 started transmitting different matches of the UEFA Europa League–until 2013, in partial simulcast with Italia 1 and Italia 1 HD free practice, qualifying and all of the Grand Prix of the world Championship and, from 2013 to 2018, free trials, qualifications and races of the world championships in Superbike, Superstock, Superstock 300 and the European Superstock 1000.

As of September 2012, the schedule has been enhanced with the daily broadcast of the second edition of Sport Mediaset. In 2013, the historical program Superclassifica Show made a return on Italia 2, renamed Superclassifica 2.

On September 2, 2012, the channel was to be restyled, which should have been called Italia .2, but in fact, it never materialized despite Mediaset announcing it with some promos broadcast during the summer of 2012.

On 19 April 2018, Italia 2 was replaced by a relaunch of Focus on its original frequencies on channel 35. Italia 2 was transferred to channel 120 on mux La3. On 28 February 2019, the channel took the channel 66, bought to Retecapri.

As of January 2, 2019, Italia 2 is also available to be viewed on the Sky Italia platform at channel number 175.

== Format ==
In the strategies of Mediaset, Italia 2 goes alongside La5, a channel aimed instead at a female audience. The schedule of the channel reflects this logic: it is composed of television series, films, animated shows (some first-run), music, and sporting events, in addition to the revival of some of the TV programs of Italia 1, to which the network is affiliated. There are also some occasional internal productions.

== Digital terrestrial frequencies ==
The spread of the channel began on digital terrestrial and originally on LCN 35 and, after a few weeks, also on the satellite platform Tivùsat, on Hotbird, frequency 11.013 MHz (later on 11.919 MHz, the historical frequency for Mediaset, where there is still).

As of February 28, 2019, the channel is visible on LCNs 66 and 566.

== Directors ==
Name	Period
Luca Tiraboschi	July 4, 2011–November 2, 2014
Marco Costa	Since November 3, 2014

== Audience share ==
The goal of the channel is to reach a 0.4% share on the total individuals and 0.55% on the commercial target.

The maximum peak ratings achieved by the channel took place on October 14, 2012, during the Red Bull Stratos (which had an average audience of 867,000 viewers) with a share of 4.90% of the target individuals and 15.20% of the target men aged 15–34 years, with peaks of 1,856,000 viewers and the 19.4% share for the targeted audience.

== Continuity announcers ==
From 2011 to 2013, the official continuity announcer of Italia 2 was Paolo de Santis, while from 2014, it was Gianluca Iacono. For short periods, Simone d'Andrea also served as a continuity announcer in 2015 and Luca Bottale in 2017.
