= 20 (TV channel) =

Italian television channel

- Country: Italy
- Broadcast area: Italy; Switzerland

Programming
- Language: Italian
- Picture format: 1080i HDTV (downscaled to 16:9 576i for the SDTV feed)

Ownership
- Owner: Mediaset Italia (MFE - MediaForEurope)
- Sister channels: Rete 4 Canale 5 Italia 1 Iris; 27 Twentyseven; La5; Cine 34; Focus; Top Crime; Boing; Boing Plus; Cartoonito; Italia 2 TGcom24; Mediaset Extra

History
- Launched: 3 April 2018; 8 years ago

Links
- Website: 20 Mediaset

Availability

Terrestrial
- Digital terrestrial television: Channel 20 (HD)

Streaming media
- Mediaset Infinity: 20

20 is an Italian free-to-air television channel, operated by Mediaset and owned by MFE - MediaForEurope. It was founded and started to broadcast in 2018.

== History ==
Following the acquisition of channel 20 from the Television Broadcasting System Group, from 5 May 2017 to 22 March 2018, Mediaset broadcast a provisional program consisting of fiction and telenovelas from the Mediaset library, with the brand Retecapri, which, from 22 March 2018, had given way to promos advertising the new channel 20.

=== Launch ===
The channel officially launched at 7:30 pm on 3 April 2018 with the first round of the quarterfinals of the UEFA Champions League between Juventus FC and Real Madrid C.F. followed by the exclusive match in free-to-air, averaging 6,569,000 viewers and 23.35% ratings share. It was the most watched program that evening.

== Transmission ==
The channel airs on digital terrestrial television (DTT) in SD on channel 20 in the Mediaset 2 multiplex and in HD on Tivù Sat. It is available with two audio tracks in Italian and original language.

From 1 June 2018, it is available in HD also on DTT on channel 520 in La3 multiplex.

From 12 September 2018, the channel's SD feed is also available on Tivù Sat.

Since 2 January 2020, 20 is available on Sky Italia channel 151.

== Programming ==
20 proposes principally TV-Series, films and sport events.

=== TV Series ===
- Agent X
- Anger Management
- Badass!
- Blood Drive
- Chicago Fire
- Community
- Containment
- Covert Affairs
- Frequency
- Grimm
- Gotham
- Heroes Reborn
- Homeland
- Hostages
- House M.D.
- Hyde and Seek
- In Plain Sight
- Imposters
- Lucifer
- Miracle Workers
- Mr. Robot
- Murder in the First
- New Amsterdam
- Renegade
- Person of Interest
- Psych
- Proof
- Suits
- Station 19
- Shades of Blue
- Taken
- The 100
- The Big Bang Theory
- The Following
- The Girlfriend Experience
- The Last Kingdom
- The Mentalist
- The Sinner
- The Vampire Diaries
- Two and a Half Men

=== Sport events ===
- International football friendlies
- UEFA Nations League
- UEFA Euro 2020 qualifying
- UEFA Youth League
- Formula E (14 races live)
- Extreme E
- Super Bowl LIV
- Autumn Nations Cup
- FIFA Club World Cup
- 2022 FIFA World Cup qualification (UEFA)
- Coppa Italia
- Italian Open (International BNL of Italia, 2021)
