= La5 =

- Country: Italy
- Broadcast area: Italy, reaching bordering regions via overspill of the Italian terrestrial network

Programming
- Language: Italian
- Picture format: 1080i HDTV

Ownership
- Owner: Mediaset Italia (MFE - MediaForEurope)
- Sister channels: Rete 4 Canale 5 Italia 1; 20; Iris; 27 Twentyseven; Cine34; Focus; Top Crime; Boing; Boing Plus; Cartoonito; Italia 2 TGcom24; Mediaset Extra

History
- Launched: 12 May 2010

Links
- Website: La5

Availability

Terrestrial
- Digital terrestrial television: Channel 30

Streaming media
- Mediaset Infinity: La5

La5 is an Italian entertainment television channel, launched on 12 May 2010, operated by the media company Mediaset and owned by MFE - MediaForEurope. It is broadcast in Italy on DTT channel 30 on mux Mediaset 4 and digital satellite television through Tivù Sat.

It is dedicated to a female audiences and broadcasts movies, television series and soap operas.

== Programming ==
=== TV series ===
- Acacias 38
- Baciati dall'amore
- The Bold and the Beautiful
- Beautiful People
- Buffy the Vampire Slayer
- Californication
- Cashmere Mafia
- Caterina e le sue figlie
- Erkenci Kuş
- Emilie Richards
- Friends
- Gilmore Girls
- Hope & Faith
- House
- Jack & Bobby
- Inga Lindström
- L'onore e il rispetto
- Le tre rose di Eva
- The O.C.
- The Originals
- Patito Feo
- Privileged
- Pushing Daisies
- Riverdale
- Royal Pains
- Rules of Engagement
- El secreto de Puente Viejo
- Storm of Love
- The Tudors
- Una nuova vita
- Un Paso Adelante
- The Vampire Diaries
- Veronica Mars
- Vivere
- Wildfire
- Will & Grace

=== Entertainment programs ===
- Amici di Maria De Filippi
- Grande Fratello
- Pomeriggio Cinque
- La Pupa e il Secchione
- Verissimo
