= Top Crime =

- Country: Italy
- Broadcast area: Italy; Switzerland

Programming
- Languages: Italian; English
- Picture format: 1080i HDTV

Ownership
- Owner: Mediaset
- Parent: MFE - MediaForEurope
- Sister channels: Rete 4 Canale 5 Italia 1; 20; Iris; 27 Twentyseven; La5; Cine34; Focus; Boing; Boing Plus; Cartoonito; Italia 2 TGcom24; Mediaset Extra

History
- Launched: 1 June 2013
- Replaced: For You

Links
- Website: www.mediasetplay.mediaset.it/topcrime

Availability

Terrestrial
- Digital terrestrial television: Channel 39

Top Crime, often stylised TOPcrime, is a thematic television channel, dedicated to the TV series and movies on the world of crime, operated by Mediaset and owned by MFE - MediaForEurope. The broadcasts began on 1 June 2013 both on digital terrestrial television (on mux Mediaset Italia 2), and on satellite via the satellite platform Tivù Sat, both with the channel 39. The trailer with previews of the schedule were first shown on 21 May of that year. The channel started its regular broadcasts transmitting the first two episodes of the seventh season, first-run movies for television of Bones.

The channel offers re-run television series such as Columbo and Poirot, as well as new films themed for this type of programming.

== Television series ==
- Hannibal
- Found
- Motive
- Major Crimes
- Person of Interest
- Damages
- Chase
- Bones
- Life
- The Shield
- 24
- Raising the Bar
- Women's Murder Club
- Judging Amy
- Psych
- Undercovers
- White Collar
- Rescue: Special Ops
- Magnum, P.I.
- Rescue Me
- RIS Delitti Imperfetti
- Law & Order: SVU
- Law & Order: Criminal Intent
- Prison Break
- GSG 9

== Movie ==
- Serial Killer Story
- All Hitchcock
- John Grisham Collection
- Seven
- Red Dragon
- The Bone Collector
- Sherlock Holmes

== Documentaries ==
- Urban Legends
- Cold blood
- True CSI
- Psychic Investigators
