= Cine Sony =

- Country: Italy
- Broadcast area: Italy; San Marino; Vatican City

Programming
- Language: Italian
- Picture format: 480i (SDTV); 576i (SDTV); 1080i (HDTV)

Ownership
- Owner: Sony Pictures Television
- Sister channels: Pop

History
- Launched: 7 September 2017; 8 years ago
- Closed: 11 July 2019; 6 years ago
- Replaced by: Mediaset Extra 2

Links
- Website: cinesony.it

Cine Sony was an Italian free-to-air television channel owned by Sony Pictures Television.

The channel launched on 7 September 2017 and closed on 11 July 2019 after Sony Pictures Television sold it and sister channel Pop's slots to Mediaset. Cine Sony's former slot would be used to launch a temporary channel called Mediaset Extra 2. Cine Sony aired Knife Fight before its shutdown.

== Programming ==
Owned by the Sony Pictures Television subsidiary of Sony Corporation, its programming consisted of documentaries, films, TV series and shows produced from Sony Pictures Entertainment. The channel included contents from Columbia Pictures, TriStar Pictures and Sony Pictures Classics.

- Cine Classic: la storia di Hollywood
- Donne da oscar
- I migori registri di Hollywood
- La fabbrica dei sogni: storia e volti del cinema italiano
- Ultimate Countdown: CineClassifica
- Vite da star

== Film ==
- Captain Philips
- Walk the Line
- Hollow Man

== See also ==
- Television in Italy
- List of Sony Pictures Television programs
- Sony Pictures Networks
