= Boing (company) =

Italian children's television company

Boing S.p.A.
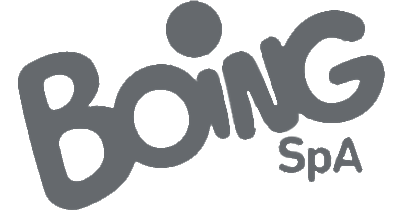

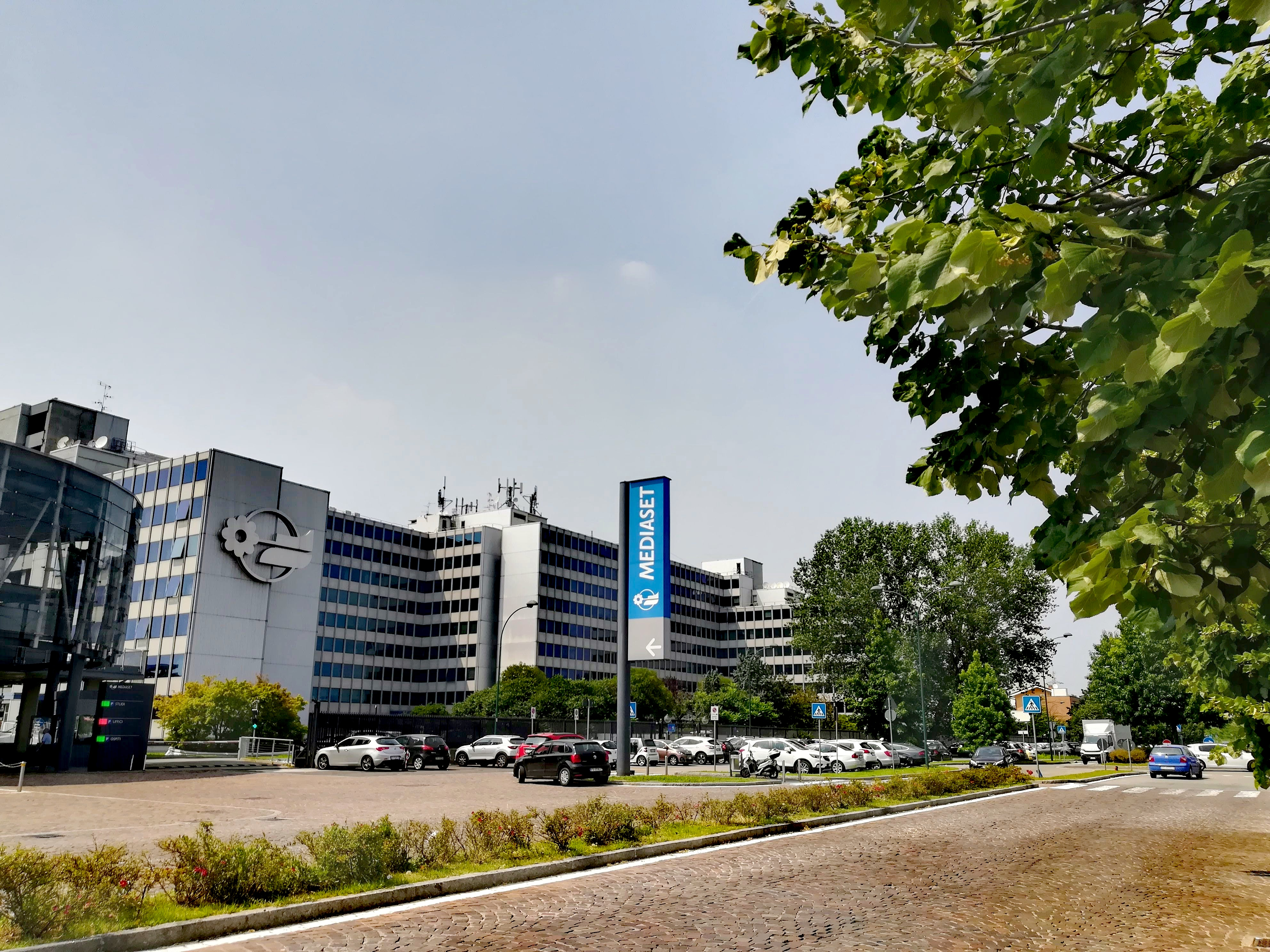
- Headquarters in Cologno Monzese
- Type: Società per azioni
- Industry: Media
- Founded: 5 November 2004; 21 years ago
- Headquarters: Cologno Monzese, Milan, Italy
- Key people: Marcello Dolores (CEO); Silvio Carini (Chairman)
- Products: Television channels
- Number of employees: 11-50 (2023)
- Parent: Mediaset (51%); Skydance Corporation (49%)
- Website: boingtv.it

Boing S.p.A. is an Italian children's television broadcasting company operated as a joint venture between Mediaset, which owns a 51% stake in the company, and Skydance Corporation, which owns a 49% stake in the company. It was established with a capital of € 10 million between Mediaset and Turner Broadcasting System Europe.

== History ==
The company was founded as a joint venture between Mediaset and Turner Broadcasting System Europe with the aim of launching the first free-to-air Italian television channel aimed at children.

In 2011, the company launched the Italian version of Cartoonito, a channel aimed at preschool children.

On 15 March 2013, Mediaset sold the children's business unit to Boing S.p.A.

Boing achieved a pre-eminent position in children's television broadcasting thanks to the ratings achieved by Boing and Cartoonito in 2013 and 2014.

On 11 July 2019, Boing Plus launched, replacing Pop, which was owned by Sony Pictures Entertainment Italia.

On 9 July 2026, it was announced that Warner Bros. Discovery Italia's two free-to-air children's networks, Frisbee and K2, would be transferred over to Boing S.p.A. to expand the company's offerings in the children's market.

== Channels ==
=== Boing ===
Boing launched on 20 November 2004 as a joint venture between Mediaset and Turner. The channel targets children aged 4–14. It is available on channel 40 of digital terrestrial television and on Mediaset Infinity.

=== Boing Plus ===
Boing Plus launched on 11 July 2019, replacing Pop, a television channel owned by Sony Pictures Entertainment Italia, after the company purchased its time slot from Mediaset.

=== Cartoonito ===
Cartoonito launched on 22 August 2011. The channel is aimed at a preschool audience.

=== K2 ===
Originally launched as a network by Jetix's Italian operations in 2009, K2 focuses on a young male audience. It was acquired alongside Frisbee from Warner Bros. Discovery Italia in July 2026.

=== Frisbee ===
Originally launched by Switchover Media in 2010, Frisbee focuses on a pre-school audience. It was acquired alongside K2 from Warner Bros. Discovery Italia in July 2026.

== Management ==
Since 18 May 2023, the company's CEO has been Marcello Dolores. Since 2018, the channels' director has been Alice Fedele and the company chairman is Silvio Carini.

== Advertising ==
The advertising on its three channels is managed by Publitalia 80'.
