= Giallo (TV channel) =

Italian television channel

- Country: Italy
- Broadcast area: National

Programming
- Language: Italian
- Picture format: 576i SDTV

Ownership
- Owner: Switchover Media (2012–2013); Discovery Italia (2013–2022); Warner Bros. Discovery Italy (2022–present)
- Sister channels: Nove; Discovery; Discovery Turbo; DMAX; Food Network; Frisbee; HGTV; K2; Real Time

History
- Launched: May 14, 2012; 14 years ago
- Replaced: CanalOne

Giallo is an Italian free television channel owned by Warner Bros. Discovery EMEA.

== History ==
=== Switchover Media management (2012–2013) ===
On 7 May 2012, Giallo replaced the CanalOne broadcasts with a sign announcing the launch of the channel, in which the protagonists wrote sentences on a wall (with reference to the "chromatic" idioms of the Italian language), then erased with yellow paint, occurred on 14 May at 4:00 pm by Switchover Media.

=== Discovery Italia management (2013–2022) ===
Since 14 January 2013, the channel has been produced by Discovery Italia, after the acquisition of the latter by the publisher Switchover Media. From 9 April 2014, Giallo also transmits via satellite on Sky Italia at channel 144. Three days later the channel renews its logo and graphics and also changes its position, moving to the top left. From 6 February of the same year, the transparent "D" is added to the left of the logo. The same thing for the other free channels belonging to Discovery, from 23 July of the same year, Giallo also broadcasts on Tivù Sat to channel 38.

From 10 April 2020, as also happened on Real Time, the superimposed logo has undergone some changes, becoming monochromatic and with the Discovery logo in full in place of the D-globe.
