= Frisbee (TV channel) =

Italian TV channel for children

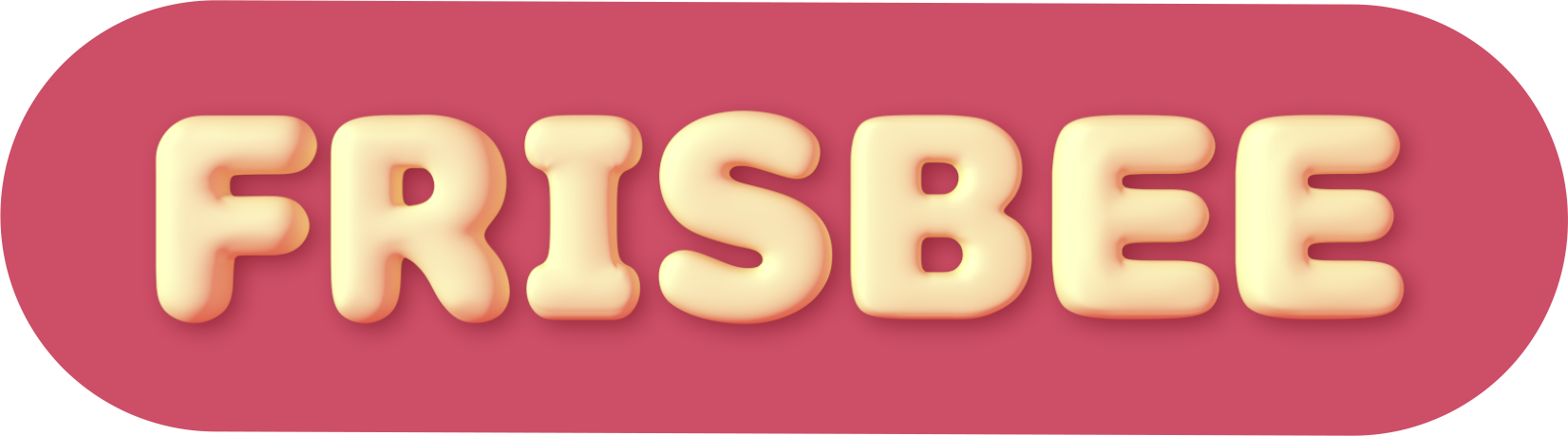
- Country: Italy
- Headquarters: Rome

Programming
- Language: Italian
- Picture format: 1080i HDTV

Ownership
- Owner: Switchover Media (2010–2013); Discovery Italia (2013–2022); Warner Bros. Discovery EMEA (2022–2026); Boing S.p.A. (2026–present)
- Sister channels: Boing; Boomerang; Cartoon Network; Cartoonito; Discovery; Discovery Turbo; DMAX; Food Network; Giallo; HGTV; K2; Nove; Real Time

History
- Launched: 12 June 2010 at 7am

Links
- Website: frisbeetv.it

Availability

Terrestrial
- Digital terrestrial television: Channel 44

Streaming media
- Discovery+: Frisbee

Frisbee is an Italian TV television channel owned by Boing S.p.A. a division of Skydance Corporation and Mediaset aimed at children aged 4 to 14.

== History ==
Frisbee was launched by Switchover Media on 12 June 2010. The channel was marketed at a male audience as a "Channel of Heroes".

After Switchover was acquired by Discovery Communications, On 30 June 2013 the channel rebranded in order to target a female audience and switched its aspect ratio to 16:9.

On 30 April 2015 the channel rebranded again and changed its focus to a general 4–14 year old audience.

== Programs ==
During the beginning of the channel's existence (2011–2013), almost all the programs featured were ex-Jetix shows acquired from Disney-ABC International Television which meant for the first few years, the channel would not need to acquire any new programming. By 2011, the channel began to air reruns of sitcoms, alongside the addition of more modern programming as well.

The current schedule currently focuses on the preschool demographic, featuring shows such as Curious George. Until mid-2019 there was a FRISBEEMINI block which aired shows aimed at preschoolers, however it was removed due to the channel shifting exclusively to that demographic. During the night/graveyard slots it airs programs present on its sister channel K2, such as Oggy and the Cockroaches alongside shows from Discovery like Cake Boss.
