= TgCom24 =

Italian news TV channel and website

TGcom24
- Country: Italy

Programming
- Language: Italian
- Picture format: 1080i HDTV

Ownership
- Owner: Mediaset Italia (MFE - MediaForEurope)
- Sister channels: Rete 4 Canale 5 Italia 1; 20; Iris; 27 Twentyseven; La 5 Cine34; Focus; Top Crime; Boing; Boing Plus; Cartoonito; Italia 2 Mediaset Extra

History
- Launched: 28 November 2011; 14 years ago

Links
- Website: http://www.tgcom24.mediaset.it

Availability

Terrestrial
- Digital terrestrial television: Channel 51

Tgcom24 is an Italian cross‑media news system that includes the 24‑hour all‑news television channel Tgcom24, the website tgcom24.mediaset.it, social media channels, and related digital platforms.

The online platform originated from the earlier news website TGcom (launched in 2001), which was closed on 28 November 2011 and replaced by tgcom24.mediaset.it, coinciding with the launch of the Tgcom24 TV channel.

Operated by Mediaset and owned by MFE – MediaForEurope, the channel broadcasts on channel 51 of the Italian digital terrestrial network and, historically, on channel 509 of Sky Italia’s satellite platform.

The channel runs live breaking‑news bulletins and simulcast or deferred editions of selected Mediaset programs, including Mattino 4, TG4, Studio Aperto, TG5, Diario del giorno, Pomeriggio Cinque (first hour) and 4 di sera, as well as deferred editions of Sport Mediaset.

== Directors ==
The editorial direction of the channel has been held by the following directors:

Name	Period
Mario Giordano	2011-2014
Alessandro Banfi	2014-2015
Paolo Liguori	2015-2019
Andrea Pucci	2019

== See also ==
- Television in Italy
- Digital terrestrial television in Italy
- Mediaset
- TGCOM
- Sport Mediaset
