= Jetix Europe =

Defunct European television broadcasting company

Jetix Europe N.V.
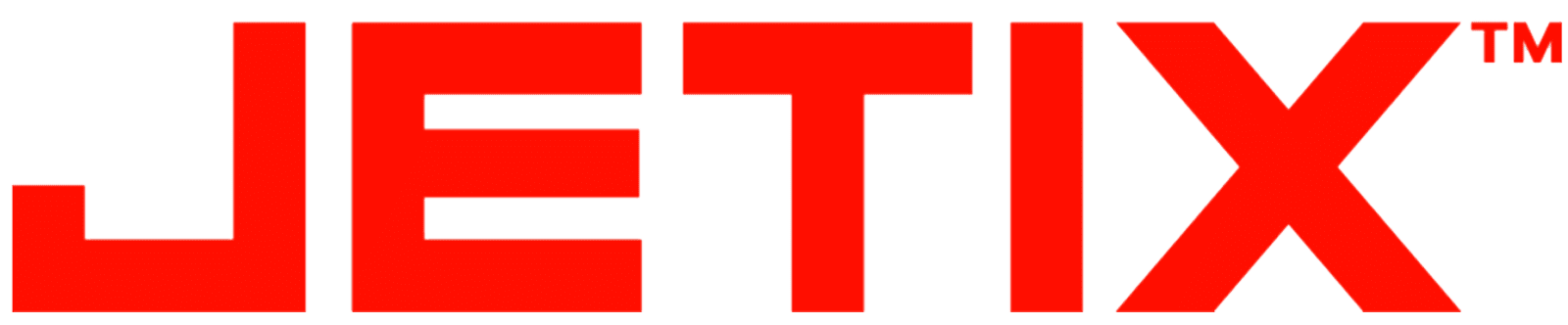
- Formerly: Fox Kids Europe N.V. (1996–2004)
- Type: Subsidiary
- Traded as: AMEX: FKE; Reuters: FOXK.AS; Bloomberg: FKE.NA
- Industry: Television
- Founded: 12 September 1996; 30 years ago
- Defunct: 20 April 2014; 12 years ago
- Fate: Remaining shares purchased by The Walt Disney Company, assets dispersed into other Disney units on 20 April 2014.
- Headquarters: London, United Kingdom, Paris, France
- Area served: Europe, Middle East
- Products: Television channels, programming blocks, licensed merchandise
- Number of employees: 362
- Parent: BVS Entertainment
- Subsidiaries: Jetix Consumer Products (JCP); Jetix Europe Limited (50% joint venture with Sky UK); Jetix Italy S.r.l. (joint venture with Sky Italia); Jetix España S.L. (Joint venture with Sogecable S.A.); Jetix Poland Limited (Minority owner, subsidiary of United Pan-Europe Communications N.V.); TV10 B.V. (Joint venture with SBS Broadcasting); Jetix Europe GmbH (joint venture with Premiere Fernsehen GmbH & Co. KG); Jetix Israel

Jetix Europe N.V. (formerly known as Fox Kids Europe N.V.) was a European television broadcasting company that owned children's television channels and programming blocks across Europe and Asia, such as Jetix and Jetix Play.

== History ==
=== Fox Kids Europe ===
==== Formation ====
In September 1995, Fox Broadcasting Company and Saban Entertainment announced they had formed a strategic partnership in the creation of children's programming networks worldwide under the Fox Kids umbrella. The networks would capitalise on Saban's library and Fox-parent News Corp's distribution strength. The venture launched their first international Fox Kids Network branded channel in the United Kingdom on 19 October 1996.

After the successful launch of Fox Kids UK, five additional Fox Kids networks were launched between 1997 and 1999 for the Netherlands, France, Poland, Scandinavia and Spain.

On 1 April 1999, the Central and Eastern Europe feed was launched for the CIS and Baltic countries.

==== Expansion and going public ====
Fox Kids Europe became a publicly traded company in November 1999 with Fox Family Worldwide holding a 75.7% majority stake and the other 24.3% being listed on the Amsterdam Stock Exchange.

In 2000, five additional Fox Kids feeds launched: Italy, Turkey, Germany, Hungary and the Middle East, while the Scandivanian feed was expanded to Iceland. These launches made Fox Kids the only children's entertainment company with a local channel in every major European market.

In late 2000, Saban Entertainment reconsolidated their European licensing subsidiary based in the United Kingdom, Saban Consumer Products Europe, as a subsidiary of Fox Kids Europe.

In February 2001, a Fox Kids feed was launched in Israel, while the Hungarian feed was extended to the Czech Republic and Slovakia, while launching in Russia as a programming block on free-to-air channel Ren TV. In June 2001, Fox Kids Europe announced that the Fox Kids brand had become the most widely distributed children's channel in Europe and the Middle East, reaching 24.9 million households and broadcasting in 54 countries through 11 channel feeds in 16 languages.

In the summer of 2001, the Italian Fox Kids channel launched a syndicated block for several local stations in Italy.

==== Purchase by The Walt Disney Company ====
On 23 July 2001, it was announced that The Walt Disney Company would purchase Fox Family Worldwide for $2.9 billion, which included FFW's majority stake in Fox Kids Europe, which was completed on 24 October 2001 The original intention of The Walt Disney Company for the Fox Kids Europe networks after the acquisition was to rebrand all operations as Toon Disney, a channel that had very little distribution internationally, but this was cancelled, and the company was instead granted a non-fixed term license with 20th Century Fox Film Corporation to continue using the "Fox Kids" brand at no charge.

In November 2001, a Greek service was launched with a limited 13-hour schedule following a 2-hour block launched in October.

On 21 March 2002, it was announced that Buena Vista International Television would take over television servicing from Saban International for the 6,300 episode Saban catalogue in Europe and the Middle East beginning in May. FKE would continue to hold all television rights in Europe and the Middle East with Buena Vista servicing FKE's programme distribution activities to third-party broadcasters, while Buena Vista would handle all rights to Saban's catalogue not under Fox Kids Europe including rights outside of Europe and the Middle East.

In December 2002, the company signed with BMG Europe for two Fox Kids Hits music compilation albums per year for 10 European markets.

In January 2003, Fox Kids Europe launched its first sister network, Fox Kids Play, in Poland. The channel later extended to CEE and MENA regions, and the brand was also used for other usages, such as a VOD channel on UK cable provider Telewest.

In April 2003, Saban Consumer Products Europe was renamed as Active Licensing Europe.

On 11 June 2003, Fox Kids Europe announced that due to the low amount of original content being supplied following the October 2001 purchase of FFW, the company would increase the level of coproduction work with Disney to produce new programmes aimed at a young male audience that would air on Fox Kids networks in Europe and the Middle East and Disney networks in all other territories; alongside the increase of third-party acquisitions. The first agreement made out of the new strategy was a three-year deal with Disney's Buena Vista Home Entertainment to release Power Rangers and select Marvel shows in English-speaking territories. The company's CEO, Bruce Steinberg, also denied that the company would be rebranded under the Disney umbrella, saying, "Fox Kids Europe won't rebrand with Disney in its name. We're a very different channel, and that's why Disney bought us. We'll exploit other synergies, such as coproductions, consumer products, and home video." The company also announced it had purchased MECH's stake in Fox Kids Israel and the Israeli rights to Saban's library, both for $20.5 million.

By 2003, Fox Kids Europe had extended to 34.8 million households in 57 countries through 12 channel feeds in 17 languages. In October 2003, it was announced that John de Mol Jr. had purchased a 5.1% stake in Fox Kids Europe. This stake was later expanded to 10.2%.

=== Jetix Europe ===
==== Introduction and rebranding ====
In January 2004, Fox Kids Europe, Fox Kids Latin America and the ABC Cable Networks Group agreed to rename its then current operations under a single brand, called Jetix, which helped strengthen its then operations into a single force. The Jetix name was chosen after the company conducted international research specifically with a number of children's focus groups. Many of the children chose the name as it implied action and adventure, and the company was able to use the name internationally due to its ambiguity. Bruce Steinberg, chairman and chief executive officer of Fox Kids Europe, explained that Jetix would help strengthen Fox Kids Europe's partnership with Disney while building new alliances to continue to successfully leverage its programming library and distribution.

The pre-launch period began with the launch of Jetix branded blocks on the Fox Kids networks which would transition to the rebrand once the name would become more familiar. The UK feed added the Jetix-branded block in April. The following month saw the subsidiaries begin to adopt the Jetix brand, with Active Licensing Europe becoming Jetix Consumer Products on 4 May 2004. Following suit with Fox Kids Europe changing to Jetix Europe on 14 July 2004.

The rebranding of the Fox Kids channels to Jetix began with the France channel's rebranding on 28 August 2004, and ending with the German channel's rebranding on 10 June 2005.

==== Later history ====
In May 2005, Jetix Europe subsidiary Jetix Italia launched GXT on Sky Italia, targeted towards male teens.

SIP Animation co-produced a few animated series with Jetix Europe during the 2000s. On March 23, 2006, the pre-1989 DIC Entertainment catalogue, consisting of 20 shows which had been held by Jetix Europe and Disney since 2001, was re-acquired by DIC. Disney retained only few portions of an early DIC Audiovisuel's shows. In December, John De Mol Jr.'s stake in Jetix Europe was increased to 17.4%.

In 2008, Jetix Europe licensed out Jetix France to The Walt Disney Company France and Disney-ABC-ESPN Television became its channel distribution partner. In February 2008, Jetix Europe was in talks to join affiliated companies, Disney Channel Europe, ESPN Europe and Disney–ABC International Television (DAIT), in their combined distribution sales unit. In June, Jetix Europe agreed to have DAIT take over distribution sales for all channels across Europe, the Middle East and Africa. In November, the Central and Eastern European channel team won gold in the U.K. Promax Awards for Jetix Max idents.

==== Full purchase by The Walt Disney Company ====
On 8 December 2008, Disney made an agreement to increase ownership in Jetix Europe to 96%, with intentions to purchase the remainder and have Jetix Europe delisted from the Euronext Amsterdam exchange. By 2009, Disney had owned 99.8% of the company.

On 15 July 2009, Jetix Europe subsidiary Jetix Italy S.r.l. announced that they would undergo a management buyout and rebrand as Switchover Media, and announced that they would purchase the GXT and K2 networks and blocks from The Walt Disney Company. The company also agreed to operate Jetix Italy for Disney until its rebranding as Disney XD Italy.

Disney XD was expected to be introduced in European territories in 2009. Later, however, Disney announced that the Jetix channel in certain countries (Hungary, Romania, Czech Republic, Slovakia, Russia, Bulgaria and Israel) would be rebranded as Disney Channel, marking that channel's first introduction in these countries. The change took place on 19 September 2009, in the CEE region.

On 19 September 2009, Disney Channel replaced Jetix in Bulgaria, the Czech Republic, Hungary, Moldova, Romania and Slovakia. But the Russian feed was still broadcasting under the Jetix name until it was announced that a separate Disney Channel would launch. After the launch of Disney Channel in Romania and Bulgaria, the Jetix feed in Russia began to be independent and became localized, with Russian titlecards and banners with Russian hours.

The last Jetix channel to rebrand as Disney XD was the Dutch version on 1 January 2010. The last Jetix channel to close was the Russian version, which was rebranded as Disney Channel on 10 August 2010. The Jetix Play channels soon followed suit in 2010 and 2011, being replaced with Playhouse Disney/Disney Junior.

Remnants of Jetix Europe continued until around 2012 to 2014, to shut down operations and as an overhang period to fully integrate Jetix into Disney. European Disney XD co-productions such as Rekkit Rabbit contained the Disney XD logo in the credits, with "Jetix Europe Properties SARL, Luxembourg, Zurich Branch" credited underneath.

As a legal entity, the UK subsidiary (which was mostly responsible for the operational side of Jetix) ended on 11 March 2019. However, other UK-based Jetix divisions, Jetix Entertainment Limited and Jetix Consumer Products UK Limited were operational until 20 April 2014, although by then Jetix's functions were already integrated into Disney. The Dutch subsidiary which mostly handled the corporate side of Jetix had its final shareholders meeting on 22 March 2012.

== Co-commissioned and produced shows ==
Buena Vista International Television serviced the television distribution of Jetix Europe's programmes, while the company itself distributed all other rights, except for W.I.T.C.H., which was entirely distributed by Disney.

=== For Fox Kids Europe ===
- Jason and the Heroes of Mount Olympus (2001–2002) (Co-produced with Saban International Paris, TF1, Fox Kids International Programming, and Fox Family Properties)
- Living with Lionel (2001–2003) (Co-produced with Unbound Studios Inc.)
- What's with Andy? (2001–2007) (Co-produced with Teletoon, CinéGroupe, Saban Entertainment (season 1), and SIP Animation (season 2))
- Gadget & the Gadgetinis (2002–2003) (Co-produced with SIP Animation, Fox Kids International Programming, DIC Entertainment Corporation, Channel Five, M6 Métropole Télévision, Mediatrade S.P.A., and ABC Family Properties)
- Pig City (2002–2003) (Co-produced with CinéGroupe, AnimaKids Productions, Red Rover Studios Limited, SMEC Animation & Graphic Technology, ProSieben, and Teletoon)

=== For Jetix Europe ===
- The Tofus (2004) (Co-produced with France 3, Teletoon, SIP Animation and CinéGroupe)
- W.I.T.C.H. (2004) (Co-produced with France 3, SIP Animation and The Walt Disney Company)
- A.T.O.M. (2005) (Co-produced with SIP Animation)
- Monster Warriors (2006) (Co-produced with Coneybeare Stories)
- Galactik Football (2006, seasons 1–2) (Co-produced with Alphanim and France 2, in association with Welkin (Season 1), Hosem (Season 1), Audi'Art, LuxAnimation (Season 1), Supersonic (Season 1), Europool (Season 2), and Carloon (Season 2). Also distributed European licensing, merchandising and home video rights))
- Shuriken School (2006) (co-produced with Xilam Animation, Zinkia Entertainment, in association with France 3)
- Team Galaxy (2006) (Co-produced with Marathon Media, Image Entertainment Corporation, in association with France 3)
- Ōban Star-Racers (2006) (Co-produced with Sav! The World Productions, in association with HAL FilmMaker, Bandai Visual, and France 3)
- Pucca (2006) (Co-produced with Studio B Productions and VOOZ Character System)
- Monster Buster Club (2008) (Co-produced with Marathon Media and Image Entertainment Corporation, in association with YTV and TF1)
- Combo Niños (2008) (Co-produced with SIP Animation and TF1)
- Kid vs. Kat (2008, season 1) (Co-produced with Studio B Productions, in association with YTV)
- Marvo the Wonder Chicken (2008/2009, season 1) (Co-produced with Red Kite Animation and The Dandy)
- Jimmy Two-Shoes (2009, season 1) (Co-produced with Breakthrough Entertainment and Mercury Filmworks, in association with Teletoon)

=== Jetix Animation Concepts shows ===
These programmes are co-productions with Walt Disney Television Animation.

- Super Robot Monkey Team Hyperforce Go! (2004)
- Get Ed (2005)
- Yin Yang Yo! (2006)

=== Licensed shows ===
Other than their own co-produced shows, Jetix Europe also licensed pay television, free-to-air television, home video, merchandising, and consumer product rights to other animated programs in Europe and the Middle East.

=== For Fox Kids Europe ===
- Why Why Family (Licensed from Saban International Paris, excluding France/Germany free-to-air television rights)
- Saban's Adventures of Oliver Twist (Licensed from Saban International Paris, excluding France free-to-air television rights)
- Saban's Sissi the Princess (Licensed from Saban International Paris, excluding France/Italy/Germany free-to-air television rights)
- Walter Melon (Licensed from Saban International Paris, excluding France/Germany free-to-air television rights)
- Monster Farm (Licensed from Saban Entertainment)
- Bad Dog (Licensed from Saban Entertainment)
- The Kids from Room 402 (Licensed from Saban Entertainment)
- Diabolik (Licensed from Saban International Paris, excluding France/Italy free-to-air television rights)
- Jim Button (Licensed from Saban International Paris, excluding France/Germany free-to-air television rights)
- Wunschpunsch (Licensed from Saban International Paris, excluding France/Germany free-to-air television rights)
- So Little Time (Licensed from Dualstar Productions, television rights only)
- The Fairly OddParents (Licensed from Nelvana, Latin America, Brazil and Italian television rights only)
- RoboRoach (Licensed from Portfolio Entertainment, including German pay television rights)
- Quintuplets (Licensed from Tokyo Broadcasting System)
- Shaman King (Licensed from TV Tokyo MediaNet)
- Tutenstein (Licensed from PorchLight Entertainment)
- Sonic X (Licensed from TMS Entertainment)
- Pucca shorts (Licensed from VOOZ Character System)

=== Jetix Europe ===
- Captain Flamingo (Licensed from Breakthrough Entertainment, excluding France)
- Iggy Arbuckle (Licensed from Blueprint Entertainment, excluding France and German free-to-air television rights)
- Urban Vermin (Licensed from DHX Media, excluding France)

== Channels ==
=== Main ===
- Central and Eastern Europe (Romania, Moldova, Russia, and Bulgaria) (Launched in February 1999, Rebranded as Jetix on January 1, 2005, and became Disney Channel on September 19, 2009. Russian version remained as Jetix until August 10, 2010)
- Central and Eastern Europe (Hungary, the Czech Republic, and Slovakia) (Launched in Hungary in November 2000 and expanded to the Czech Republic and Slovakia in February 2001. Rebranded as Jetix on January 1, 2005, and became Disney Channel on September 19, 2009)
- Central and Eastern Europe (Bulgaria) (Launched in 2003, rebranded as Jetix on January 1, 2005, and became Disney Channel on September 19, 2009)
- France (Launched in November 1997, rebranded as Jetix on August 1, 2004, and became Disney XD on April 1, 2009)
- Germany (Launched in October 2000, rebranded as Jetix on June 10, 2005, and became Disney XD in October 18, 2009)
- Greece (Launched in October 2001, rebranded as Jetix on January 1, 2005, and became Disney XD on October 3, 2009)
- Italy (Launched on March 1, 2000, rebranded as Jetix on March 1, 2005 and became Disney XD on September 28, 2009)
- Israel (Launched on April 18, 2001, rebranded as Jetix in March 2005, and became Disney Channel on September 9, 2009)
- MENA (Middle East, Africa, and Turkey) (Launched in November 2000, rebranded as Jetix on January 1, 2005 and became Disney XD on October 3, 2009)
- Netherlands (Launched on August 2, 1997, Rebranded as Jetix in February 2005 and became Disney XD on January 1, 2010)
- Poland (Launched on April 18, 1998, rebranded as Jetix on January 1, 2005, and became Disney XD on September 18, 2009)
- Russia (Became a separate feed in September 2009, and replaced with Disney Channel on August 10, 2010)
- Scandivania (Sweden, Denmark, Norway, Finland, Iceland, Lithuania, Latvia, and Estonia) (Launched on February 18, 1998, rebranded as Jetix on October 1, 2004. Merged with Toon Disney Scandivania to create Disney XD on September 12, 2009)
- Spain (Launched on November 15, 1998, rebranded as Jetix on January 7, 2005 and became Disney XD on September 18, 2009)
- United Kingdom and Ireland (Launched on October 19, 1996, and later expanded to Ireland. Rebranded as Jetix on January 1, 2005, and became Disney XD on August 31, 2009)

=== Other ===
- GXT (Italy) (Launched in 2005, sold off in 2009 and eventually closed in December 2014)
- GXT +1 (Italy) (Launched in 2008, timeshift of GXT)
- Jetix +1 (Italy) (Timeshift channel, Launched in 2003, renamed to Jetix +1 in 2005 and renamed Disney XD +1 in September 2009)
- Jetix +1 (Spain) (Timeshift channel, Launched in 2006, and renamed Disney XD +1 in September 2009)
- Jetix +1 (United Kingdom and Ireland) (Timeshift channel, Launched in September 1999, renamed to Jetix +1 on January 1, 2005, and renamed Disney XD +1 on August 31, 2009)
- Jetix Play Central & Eastern Europe (Launched in January 2003, renamed Jetix Play in 2005, expanded to Romania and the Czech Republic in 2006. Closed on August 1, 2010, in most regions, on September 1, 2010, in Turkey and on March 12, 2011, in Romania)
- K-2 (Italy) (Originally launched as a syndicated Fox Kids branded block in 2001, and renamed K-2 on October 1, 2004. Sold off in 2009 (with the launch of a dedicated channel, shortening the name to K2) and is now owned by Boing S.p.A. (A joint-venture between Skydance TV and Mediaset)
