= Boing (Italian TV channel) =

Italian television channel aimed at children

- Country: Italy
- Broadcast area: Italy, reaching bordering regions via overspill of the Italian terrestrial network
- Headquarters: Rome and Milan, Italy

Programming
- Language: Italian
- Picture format: 1080i HDTV (downscaled to 576i for the SD feed)
- Timeshift service: Boing +1 (2009-2012); Boing Plus (2019-2020)

Ownership
- Owner: Boing S.p.A. (RTI/Mediaset, 51% Skydance Corporation, 49%)
- Sister channels: List: Warner Bros. Discovery EMEA CNN International Cartoon Network Boomerang Joint Venture Cartoonito Boing Plus Mediaset Italia Rete 4 Canale 5 Italia 1 20 Iris 27 Twentyseven La5 Cine34 Focus Top Crime Italia 2 TGcom24 Mediaset Extra

History
- Launched: 20 November 2004; 22 years ago

Links
- Website: boingtv.it

Availability

Terrestrial
- Digital terrestrial television: Channel 40 (HD); Channel 540 (HD)

Boing is an Italian free-to-air television channel marketed at children and teenagers, owned by Boing S.p.A., a joint venture of Fininvest's MFE - MediaForEurope (through its Mediaset and RTI subsidiaries) and Skydance Corporation (through its International division). It is available on digital terrestrial, television and free-to-air satellite provider Tivùsat.

== History of Boing ==
First logo, used from 2004 to 2016

Third logo, used from 2016 to 2019.

The channel was launched on 20 November 2004 at 8:00 pm, after replacing VJ TV some months prior with a sign that said Boing, in arrivo. (Boing, coming soon.). In 2006, the channel rebranded to a new transparent screen bug and logo in promos, to follow the brand identity of Mediaset's other channels. The change included a new graphics package, introducing the channel's official mascots, the Animadz. Most of them lasted until August 2020.

With the launch of Cartoonito in 2011, the channel refocused its demographic to older children and teenagers. As a result, all pre-school programmes and blocks were moved to Cartoonito's schedule.

Boing rebranded to a new graphics package along with its Spanish and French feeds developed by Lumbre on 7 March 2016, teased from the week prior. Most of the Animadz remained with a new look, however, many were removed.

On 30 August 2020, Boing rebranded again to a new graphics package by Art&Graft, with only two Animadz remaining.

On 19 May 2023, Boing and Cartoonito transitioned, from standard definition 576i SDTV to the high definition 1080i HDTV ratio on all platforms.

== Sister channels ==
=== Boing +1 ===
On 23 February 2009, a one-hour timeshift of the channel - Boing +1, launched. It was, however, only available in Sardinia and Trentino-South Tyrol. The channel closed on 1 March 2012.

=== Cartoonito ===
An Italian version of Turner's pre-school channel Cartoonito was launched on 22 August 2011. The launch allowed Boing to refocus its target audience from 0-12 years to 7-12 years.

Cartoonito airs pre-school programmes mainly sourced from Warner Bros. and Nickelodeon, in addition to acquired and local shows from other Mediaset networks or abroad.

=== Boing Plus ===
Boing Plus
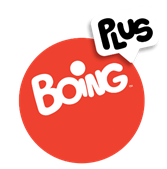

Programming
- Picture format: 576i SDTV

Ownership
- Owner: Boing S.p.A. (Mediaset/RTI, 51%; Warner Bros. Discovery EMEA, 49%)

History
- Launched: 11 July 2019; 7 years ago
- Replaced: Pop

Availability

Terrestrial
- Digital terrestrial television: Channel 45

Former logo (2020–2025)

Boing Plus is the sister channel to Boing, which launched on 11 July 2019, replacing Pop after Mediaset purchased the slot from Sony Pictures Italia. Originally, the channel operated as a one-hour timeshift service, with Cartoonito being timeshifted from 1:00 am–1:00 pm and Boing's programming for the rest of the day. On 1 December 2019, the channel began timeshifting Cartoonito from 1:00am-6:00am and Boing the rest of the day.

On 30 August 2020, Boing Plus changed its logo slightly. The channel also began to function more as a standalone channel, although still functioning as a semi-timeshift.

On 13 December 2024, Boing Plus ceased to be a timeshift service of Cartoonito, remaining only for Boing.

On 11 March 2025, Boing Plus returned to its original logo along with Mediaset's graphic choices. It's unknown if the old logo from 2020 returns to the television.
