= Mediaset Extra =

Programming
- Language: Italian
- Picture format: 1080i HDTV

Ownership
- Owner: Mediaset
- Sister channels: Rete 4 Canale 5 Italia 1; 20; Iris; 27 Twentyseven; La5; Cine34; Focus; Top Crime; Boing; Boing Plus; Cartoonito; Italia 2 TGcom24

History
- Launched: 26 November 2010; 15 years ago

Links
- Website: Mediaset Extra

Availability

Terrestrial
- Digital: Channel 55

Mediaset Extra is an Italian entertainment television channel, operated by the media company R.T.I. and owned by Mediaset, launched on 26 November 2010.

It is broadcast in Italy on DTT channel 55 on mux Mediaset 2.

The channel programming mainly consists of reruns of Mediaset's channels.

On 12 June 2018, a temporary HD feed of the channel launched on Tivùsat for the 2018 FIFA World Cup and closed on 1 August 2018. On 11 July 2019, another simulcast channel called Mediaset Extra 2 was launched on terrestrial replacing Cine Sony. This simulcasts Mediaset Extra during the day and then airs its own programming at night. The channel was replaced by Cine34 in January 2020.

== Programming ==
=== TV shows ===
Generally, Mediaset Extra repeats the cult programs in the past and present of general Mediaset channels, but there are some programs created for this channel:

- Extrashow
- Extra Comics
- Extra Week
- Maurizio Costanzo Show – La Storia

=== Telenovelas ===
- Pasión Morena
- Amore senza tempo
- Dolce Valentina
- Il segreto
- Gabriela

=== Soap operas ===
- The Bold and the Beautiful

== See also ==
- Television in Italy
- Mediaset
- R.T.I. - Mediaset
