= GXT =

Italian television channel

- Country: Italy
- Broadcast area: Italy

Programming
- Language: Italian
- Picture format: 4:3 SDTV
- Timeshift service: GXT +1

Ownership
- Owner: Jetix Italy S.r.l. (Jetix Europe (2004–2009); Switchover Media (2009–2013); Discovery Italia (2013–2014)
- Sister channels: K2

History
- Launched: 1 May 2005; 21 years ago
- Closed: 31 December 2014; 11 years ago

Links
- Website: www.gxt.it (Internet Archive)

GXT was an Italian subscription-based comedy/entertainment television channel.

== History ==
Jetix Europe launched GXT as a male teen channel in May 2005 on Mondo Sky. On 1 June 2008, a 1-hour-timeshift of GXT was launched on Sky Italia.

Due to Disney's decision to rebrand the Jetix Europe operation under the Disney XD brand umbrella, the Italian subsidiary of Jetix Europe, Jetix Italy S.r.l., bought the Italian Jetix network, renamed itself as Switchover Media, agreed to let the Jetix Italy channel rebrand itself to Disney XD Italy, and purchased K-2 and GXT from Jetix Europe in June 2009. With the acquisition of Switchover Media in January 2013 by Discovery Communications, GXT began to be managed by Discovery EMEA.

On 31 December 2014, GXT and its timeshift ceased broadcasting, after Discovery decided to not renew their broadcast deal with Sky Italia to operate the network.

== Contents ==
GXT is design to target a young and predominantly male audience, offering programming geared towards action, humor and excess, including game-shows such as Takeshi's Castle and Sasuke, sports entertainment programs such as WWE and American Gladiators as well as programs produced by Guinness World Records and comedy, action and horror films.

== TV programs ==
=== All programs ===
- Aquarius
- Bugs Television
- Crossfire
- Extreme Dodgeball
- Fear Factor
- Guinness World Records
- Guinness World Records Australia
- Guinness World Records Spagna
- GXT Sport Attack
- HAWAII MEETS VENICE
- Judo Boy
- I Dudesons
- I Re del Cazzeggio
- I Survived a Japanese Game Show
- Komitiva
- Kung Faux
- New American Gladiators
- Ninja Warrior
- Normalman
- Poker Big Game
- Poker World Open
- Robot Wars
- Roller Jam
- Scull of Rap
- Sport Stars Challenge
- The Contender Muay thai
- The Power of One
- Total Wipe Out - Pronti a tutto
- Gatchaman
- Ultimate Poker Challenge
- Unbeatable Banzuke
- Wipe Out - Pronti a tutto
- World Combat League
- WWE
- WWE After Burn
- WWE Bottom Line
- Battle Dome
- Bullrun
- Chilli Factor
- Criss Angel Mindfreak
- Crossfire
- Dog the Bounty Hunter
- Freaky
- Gamebuster
- Ghost Hunters
- Guinness World Records Primetime
- Il Filmazzo
- IFSA Strongman
- Masters of Combat
- Slamball
- Takeshi's Castle
- TNA Live: Xplosion
- TNA Live: iMPACT!
- Total Drama
- TNA Story: Pay Per View
- World's Strongest Man
