= K2 (TV channel) =

Italian children's television channel

- Broadcast area: Italy
- Headquarters: Rome

Programming
- Language: Italian
- Picture format: 1080i HDTV

Ownership
- Owner: Jetix Italy S.r.l. (2004–2009); Switchover Media (2009–2013); Discovery Italia (2013–2022); Warner Bros. Discovery EMEA (2022–2026); Boing S.p.A. (2026–present)
- Sister channels: Boomerang; Boing; Cartoonito; Cartoon Network; Discovery; Discovery Turbo; DMAX; Food Network; Frisbee; Giallo; HGTV; Nove; Real Time

History
- Launched: 1 October 2004; 22 years ago (block); 15 June 2009; 17 years ago (channel)
- Replaced: Fox Kids (Block)
- Former names: K-2 (Block)

Links
- Website: wbditalia.com/k2

Availability

Terrestrial
- Digital terrestrial television: Channel 41

Streaming media
- Discovery+: K2

K2 is an Italian free-to-air television channel owned by Boing SpA, a division of Skydance Corporation and Mediaset for children between 4 and 14 years of age. Its registered office is in Rome. It launched on 1 October 2004 as a syndicated television strand.

== History ==
=== Background ===
The channel's origins trace back to a July 2001 decision by Fox Kids Europe to launch a block for thirteen regional television stations, broadcasting for one hour a day (6-7pm) from 1 September of that year.

=== As a syndication block ===
K2 was launched on 1 October 2004 as an analogue-based block from 5pm to 7pm, which was syndicated in other Italian regional television stations, replacing Fox Kids in the process during its rebrand into Jetix. In 2009, it was launched as its own digital terrestrial television channel.

=== Becoming a real channel ===
Due to Disney's decision to rebrand the Jetix Europe operation under the Disney XD brand umbrella, the Italian subsidiary of Jetix Europe, Jetix Italy S.r.l., bought the Italian Jetix network, renamed itself as Switchover Media, agreed to let the Jetix Italy channel rebrand itself to Disney XD Italy, and purchased K-2 and GXT from Jetix Europe in June 2009.

In this period 2 channels popped up, K2 Extra and K2 Plus, however, they were just copies of the original channel and were removed in December 2012.

=== Under Discovery/WBD ===
With the acquisition of Switchover Media in January 2013 by Discovery Communications, K2 began to be managed by Discovery EMEA.

On 17 May 2021 AT&T and Discovery, Inc. reached a definitive Reverse Morris Trust agreement, in which WarnerMedia would spin out from AT&T as an independent company that in turn will acquire Discovery's assets. The $43-billion cash/securities/stock transaction, which will include the retention of certain existing WarnerMedia debt, is expected to be finalized by 8 April 2022. Upon completion, K2 and all other assets of Discovery would be combined with the WarnerMedia assets (such as Adult Swim, Boomerang, Cartoon Network, HBO, Cinemax, CNN and more). AT&T shareholders will own 71% of the company's stock and Discovery shareholders will own the remaining 29% share; Discovery President/CEO David Zaslav will be appointed to head the new company, replacing WarnerMedia CEO Jason Kilar.

In April 2022, the merger between WarnerMedia and Discovery, Inc. was completed, forming Warner Bros. Discovery, and K2 was transferred to Warner Bros. Discovery EMEA as part of it.

Starting in July 2026, the channel, alongside Frisbee became part of Boing SpA, a joint venture between WBD and Mediaset.

== Programs ==
The channel is aimed for 4-14-year-olds, airing mostly children's shows like Alvinnn!!! and the Chipmunks, Oggy and the Cockroaches, Zig & Sharko and Total DramaRama. During 10:00pm and 1:00am, along with its sister channel Frisbee, it airs a block called Family Club, with educational shows taken from Discovery's other channels, like How It's Made and How Do They Do It?. During the night instead, it airs recent French shows taken off from the daily schedule, such as The Daltons and Mr. Magoo. On weekends, it airs Pokémon marathons and Total Drama. Whenever movies are aired (mostly on Mondays), they're repeated on Saturday at 1.00pm and Sunday at 9.00am.

== Movies ==
From 2011 to 2013, the channel broadcast movies from the pre-2004 Metro-Goldwyn-Mayer library and DIC Entertainment and then from 2014 to 2021 movies from DreamWorks Animation and Universal Pictures.

== Advertising ==
The channel's current advertising is managed by PRS Media Group.
