= Cartoon Network (Italy) =

Italian pay TV channel

- Country: Italy
- Broadcast area: Italy; San Marino; Switzerland; Malta

Programming
- Languages: Italian, English
- Picture format: 1080i

Ownership
- Parent: Skydance Corporation
- Sister channels: Boomerang; Boing; Cartoonito; Frisbee; K2

History
- Launched: 31 July 1996; 30 years ago (Note: As part of Cartoon Network Europe. A dedicated feed began on 31 July 1996.)

Links
- Website: m.youtube.com/@cartoonnetworkitalia

Cartoon Network is an Italian version of the U.S. television channel of the same name. The channel, a pay TV channel available on Sky Italia and UPC Switzerland, is owned by Warner Bros. Discovery under its International division, and primarily airs animated series. The channel was originally launched as part of the larger pan-European feed back in September 1993.

The channel's official announcers are Andrea Piovan from 1996 to 2004, Paolo Monesi, Lorenzo Scattorin since 2013 and Gianluca Iacono since 2016.

== History ==
After the launch of the pan-European Cartoon Network Europe feed, distributed from the United Kingdom, on 17 September 1993, the channel distributed a multilingnual feed to 34 European countries, among them Italy, from late 1994. The channel, available via satellite, included fourteen hours of cartoons for children, timesharing with TNT, with ten hours of movies. In January 1996, Turner Broadcasting signed an agreement with Atena to transmit Cartoon Network to the Italian public through the Telepiù satellite package. Being the first digital satellite bouquet in Italy, the channel added an Italian audio track for part of the programming.

On 30 June 1996, a Cartoon Network-branded programming block was introduced on Telemontecarlo's second network, TMC2. It was an hour-long block (from 7:45pm) presented by Emanuela Panatta and Beppe Rispoli. The block was officially launched the following day, airing content from Hanna-Barbera's archives and, sometimes, from Warner Bros. Television and Metro-Goldwyn-Mayer. The block was also broadcast on Telemontecarlo in the morning, while on Sundays it aired a special edition in the afternoon. When it was on air, the block had an average share of 4,00 - 4,50% in the morning and 6,00% in the evening, with circa 200-300 overall viewers, figures higher than the network's average.

Cartoon Network Italy started broadcasting on 31 July 1996 on the Italian satellite pay TV platform TELE+ Digitale, and it later began available also on Stream TV's cable and satellite bouquet. Initially it broadcast 14 hours a day timeshared with TNT, only with the English audio track available. In Switzerland, the channel was distributed by Cablecom Ticino.

In October 1997, Stream TV began distributing a 24/7 Italian-language feed of the channel, also making it available on Telepiù. By June 1998 it split off creating a unified Spanish, French and Italian feed of Cartoon Network. The three versions were divided into channels of their own in August 1999.

Its official website opened in April 2000. In March 2001, Simona Fabbri became the channel's first director of content, Turner chose her in order to make it the most-watched kids channel in Italy. At the time, 1.6 million households in Italy and Ticino had access to the channel.

Following the buyout of Telemontecarlo to create the current La7, the Cartoon Network block returned from 2001 to 2004 under the new name Cartoon Network Week-end and later Cartoon CARTOON, presented by Panatta alone. At the time, the website was also made available at the Turbo Web service at Virgilio's Tin.it Family package. According to the ISPO 2002 study, by mid-2002, 757,000 children under 14 watched the channel for a daily average of 68 minutes. Its website had over 80,000 unique visitors and over three million page visits.

On 31 July 2003, it became exclusively available on Sky Italia, born after the two previous pay TV providers merger. That same day, the +1 timeshift started broadcasting. The channel contributed, alongside Boomerang, to the diffusion and success of Sky representing one of the most appreciated and watched content on the platform, together with CNN.

In 2004, Turner Broadcasting System participated with Wind at the time of the launch of the i-mode service in Italy, sealing an agreement, the first in the world, to distribute Cartoon Network on mobile TV.

In February 2006, Medita and Neo Network, partner of the channel for the management of multimedia and web services, collaborated for the creation of the Cartoon Network Gang web community. Accessible from Cartoon Network's official website, the community gave the possibility of accessing the schedule, listed by Medita, and an online magazine supplied by Neo Network.

On 11 September 2006, like what happened to other versions of the channel abroad before, the channel rebranded to the City era along with a new logo.

On 8 December 2008, the channel became available on Mediaset Premium, in tandem with the launch of the new Premium Fantasy package of kids channels. The arrival coincided with its special marathon for the tenth anniversary of The Powerpuff Girls, which was scheduled for the same day.

The channel rebranded again on 29 November 2010, to the CHECK it. era, with the new slogan Ce N'è., uniting it with the original American channel, this coincided with the Italian premiere of Ben 10: Ultimate Alien.

On 28 November 2016, an HD feed began transmitting exclusively on Sky Italia.

On 1 June 2018, the channel closed on Mediaset Premium.

On 1 May 2020, the channel became available on Now, replacing Disney Channel following its closedown.

On 15 December 2020, Cartoon Network SD feed closed (after being limited to Sky Go since March), becoming thus only available in HD. However, its +1 timeshift channel is still only available in SD.

On 15 March 2021, Cartoon Network launched the "#ioSonoDiverso" (I'm Different) campaign to celebrate diversity through four short films presented by several testimonials: singer-songwriter Francesco Gabbani, female footballer Sara Gama, presenter Andrea Delogu and youtuber CiccioGamer89. The shorts were animated by youtuber Sio and Fraffrog e and aired from 15 March to 14 June 2021, accompanied by characters from Steven Universe, The Powerpuff Girls, The Amazing World of Gumball, Adventure Time and We Bare Bear. Before the shorts aired, Cartoon Network revealed the arrival of shorts from another campaign, "Be a Buddy not a Bully", in order to raise awareness of bullying among kids, which aired from July 2021.

Following Sky's NowForTheKids initiative, some of its programs were available from 21 April 2022 also available in the Ukrainian language with dubs or subtitles on Now for Ukrainian refugee children who fled the country due to the war. In June, Cartoon Network finished a refurbishing project of green areas in Milan, Florence and Naples, respectively: the Gardin of Desires, the Cubattoli garden and the Viviani Park orchard. The project even included the re-evaluation of the green areas and of the eplay xones, the planting of trees, the creation of seats and systems that can facilitate aggregation and educational paths and the decoration of areas and walls with characters from the network. In occasion of the thirtieth anniversary of the network, a special event was held in Rome on 27 December 2022, during which a light show was held with drones forming characters from Courage the Cowardly Dog, The Powerpuff Girls, Ben 10, Adventure Time, The Amazing World of Gumball, We Bare Bears and The Heroic Quest of Prince Ivandoe, accompanied by music from their respective shows.

In May 2025, Cartoon Network Italy’s website, along with Boomerang’s, was sunsetted with the domains pointing to their YouTube channels.

In November 2025, it was announced that as part of Sky Italia not renewing its carriage deal with Warner Bros. Discovery, Cartoon Network and Boomerang would shut down on 1 January 2026. On 13 December, it was announced that Sky had entered into negotiations with Warner Bros. Discovery, which would allow both networks to remain broadcasting.

== Logos ==
31 July 1996 - 11 September 2006

11 September 2006 - 29 November 2010

29 November 2010 – present

== Cartoon Network +1 ==
Cartoon Network +1 was a 1 hour timeshift channel based in the United Kingdom and Ireland television channel of the same name launched on 31 July 2003, used also as a channel to air temporary special programming.

From 4 to 12 February 2017 Cartoon Network +1, along with the British version, became Cartoon Network Lego Days, airing only LEGO series and movies. This schedule got repeated from 27 October to 4 November 2018 and from 18 to 27 October 2019.

From 4 to 14 March 2021 the channel became a We Bare Bears channel, airing only We Bare Bears.

It closed on 1 January 2026.
