= Cartoonito (Italian TV channel) =

Italian television channel aimed at children

- Country: Italy
- Broadcast area: Italy, reaching bordering regions via overspill of the Italian terrestrial network

Programming
- Language: Italian
- Picture format: 1080i HDTV

Ownership
- Owner: Boing S.p.A. (RTI/Mediaset, 51% Skydance Corporation, 49%)
- Sister channels: List: Skydance Corporation CNN International Cartoon Network Boomerang Joint Venture Boing Boing Plus Mediaset Rete 4 Canale 5 Italia 1 20 Iris 27 Twentyseven La5 Cine34 Focus Top Crime Italia 2 TGcom24 Mediaset Extra

History
- Launched: 22 August 2011; 15 years ago

Links
- Website: cartoonito.it

Availability

Terrestrial
- Digital terrestrial television: Channel 46 (HD)

Original logo with purple eyes, used from 2011 to 2018

Former logo with black eyes, used from 2018 to 2022

Cartoonito is an Italian free-to-air television channel owned by Boing S.p.A., a joint venture of Fininvest's MFE - MediaForEurope (through its Mediaset and RTI subsidiaries) and Skydance Corporation (through its International division). It is available on digital terrestrial television and free-to-view satellite provider Tivùsat.

The channel was launched on 22 August 2011 and airs preschool programs mainly sourced from Warner Bros. Discovery, in addition to acquired and local shows from other Mediaset networks or aboard.

Cartoonito was launched on the channel on 14 November 2015 at 8:30PM where you follow the Cartoonitos while the words (lyrics) are on the screen. By far, this was being seen on the Cartoonito Italy website and during every show on the channel itself.
