= Canale 5 =

Italian television channel

- Logo used since 2018
- Country: Italy
- Broadcast area: Italy, reaching bordering regions via overspill of the Italian terrestrial network
- Headquarters: Milan, Italy

Programming
- Language: Italian
- Picture format: 1080i HDTV

Ownership
- Owner: Mediaset (MFE - MediaForEurope)
- Sister channels: Rete 4 Italia 1; 20; Iris; 27 Twentyseven; La5; Cine34; Focus; Top Crime; Boing; Boing Plus; Cartoonito; Italia 2 TGcom24; Mediaset Extra

History
- Launched: 11 November 1980
- Former names: TeleMilano 58 (1978–1980)

Links
- Website: Canale 5

Availability

Terrestrial
- Digital terrestrial television: Channel 5 (HD)

Streaming media
- Mediaset Infinity: Canale 5

Canale 5 (Italian: [kaˈnaːle ˈtʃiŋkwe]) is an Italian free-to-air television channel owned by Mediaset. In 1980, it became the first private television network to achieve national coverage in Italy. The channel is aimed mainly at an adult audience and its programming is geared towards entertainment, including movies and TV series.

== History ==
=== 1970s ===
In 1974, Giacomo Properzj and Alceo Moretti founded the private cable television station Telemilanocavo in a suburb of Milan. It began cable transmission on 24 September, following a verdict of the Constitutional Court of Italy in July of that year, which liberalised regulations pertaining to this type of television broadcasting. Approximately 5,000 households were connected to the cable system, which corresponded to about 20,000 viewers.

In 1976, the Constitutional Court further liberalised broadcasting regulations, allowing for terrestrial broadcasting. The competition from the new terrestrial channels led to a fall in revenues for Telemilanocavo, causing the owners to sell the station in 1976 for the symbolic price of one lira to a company belonging to the Berlusconi group.

The new owners moved the studios to the Palazzo dei Cigni and changed the channel name to Telemilano 58. 58 was the UHF frequency that the channel was broadcast over. It was previously used by TVI Television International of Milan, which Berlusconi had purchased. Further investments in technology were made with the help of Adriano Galliani, an entrepreneur who specialised in television equipment. The 1979–1980 season led to the popularity of the station, with programmes hosted by well-known presenters like Mike Bongiorno, Claudio Lippi, Claudio Cecchetto and I Gatti di Vicolo Miracoli, among others.

On 23 February 1979, the trademark Canale 5 was registered in Milan. A few months later, on 12 November, the trademark Canale 5 Music S.r.l was also registered in the same city. The name was chosen by Berlusconi and Galliani "as a matter of euphony," as well as due to the broadcaster's national aspirations, which did not jibe with the fact of having "Milan" in the name. During this time, Berlusconi had acquired several local private broadcasters scattered throughout Italy, including the Fiat Group's Tele Torino International.

=== 1980s ===
In January 1980, with a view to creating a national network, Silvio Berlusconi reached an agreement with 25 private broadcasters across the country, including those not owned by him, to broadcast the same programmes in the same time slots. The experiment officially began with the game show I sogni nel cassetto (Dreams in the Drawer), hosted by Mike Bongiorno and produced by Reteitalia. This show, together with other Reteitalia productions, achieved a significant viewership thanks to the "pizzone" technique which allowed Reteitalia's shows to be broadcast nationwide. The technique consisted of recording the programmes on videocassettes, with the advertising already inserted, and distributing them via courier (daily or weekly depending on the programme) from the operations centre in Milan to the consortium of local private broadcasters distributed across the whole national territory. Thus began Canale 5's activities as an extra-regional broadcaster throughout northern Italy.

In the region of Lombardy, where the operations centre was located, programming ran throughout the day, while in other regions, it could only be broadcast in the late morning or in the evening due to the nature of the distribution of tapes. In central-southern Italy, meanwhile, Canale 5 initially went by the name Canale 10. However, on 11 November 1980, Canale 10 was officially replaced by Canale 5. The opening and closing theme of the programmes began with the song Rondò Veneziano by Gian Piero Reverberi, chosen by Berlusconi under the advice of Baby Records.

The first major sporting event broadcast by Canale 5 was the 1980 World Champions' Gold Cup, a football tournament in Uruguay which ran from 30 December 1980 to 10 January 1981. Reteitalia had initially secured the European television rights for the tournament, but they ultimately decided to sell them to RAI. In exchange for the sale, Reteitalia was allowed to broadcast the tournament, with a few exceptions for national matches and the final match. The matches were broadcast live in Lombardy and at a delay in the rest of the country, reaching 8 million viewers.

In 1981, Canale 5 obtained legal recognition as a unitary circuit that broadcast over the following stations: (Note: The companies related to these stations were then absorbed by the Canale 5 S.p.A company in 1990.)

- Telemilano 58 (Lombardia);
- Tele Emilia-Romagna (Emilia-Romagna);
- Tele Torino International (Piemonte);
- Video Adige (Trentino-Alto Adige);
- Video Veneto (Veneto);
- A&G Television (Liguria);
- Tele Toscana 1 and Teleamiata (Toscana);
- Videoumbria (Umbria);
- Roma TV (Lazio);
- Sole TV (Abruzzo);
- Ischia TV (Campania);
- Puglia TV (Puglia);
- Tele Calabria 1 (Calabria);
- TVR and Tele Monte Lauro (Sicilia);
- Sardegna TV (Sardegna).

In 1981, Hello Goggi, the first variety show produced by Fininvest, aired. The show was presented by Loretta Goggi, who was the first RAI personality to leave public TV to join Canale 5. However, the programme did not reach its anticipated ratings due to the network's inexperience in the production of variety shows and the lack of live coverage, then reserved for public and local broadcasters.

With the advent of the morning show Buongiorno Italia, presented by Marco Columbro and Antonella Vianini, Canale 5's scheduling was extended to the morning; previously, morning broadcasts had been restricted to Lombardy. In the evening, meanwhile, Canale 5 started broadcasting a news programme called Speciale Canale 5 - News, though it was not live. Also in 1981, Canale 5 bought the rights to broadcast the American soap opera Dallas, which, in the following years, was the subject of an "audience war" against rival show Dynasty, airing on their competitor network, Rete 4. In the early 1980s, Canale 5 also started using block programming, airing shows such as Pomeriggio Con Five and Okay, which featured a variety of cartoons from the United States, Europe and Japan. The afternoon schedule was filled with American series and soap operas, while quiz shows and game shows, such as Encore, hosted by Mike Bongiorno, ran in the morning. In addition, the network had 6,000 hours' worth of cinema in its warehouse.

Between 1980 and 1981, advertising revenues increased from 13 to 75 billion lire. From 1981 to 1983, it increased further to 110 billion, representing about 20% of the total share.

Between September and December 1981, the average daily audience was 1,400,000, equal to about 10% of the total audience. In 1983, the percentage rose to 13%.

In 1982, in the footsteps of Loretta Goggi and Mike Bongiorno, many other Italian television personalities from RAI signed a contract with Canale 5. Among them were Corrado Mantoni, who presented the new morning quiz show Il Pranzo è Servito, and the couple Sandra Mondaini and Raimondo Vianello, who presented the variety show Attenti a noi due.

In 1982, the Speciale Canale 5 - News segment changed its name to Canale 5 News and began to broadcast in the late evening. In 1983, the evening television audience amounted to over 8 million, equal to almost 30% of the total; in 1984, according to the ISTEL survey, it exceeded 9 million, equal to 33%. Among the successes of the period were the television series Dallas and miniseries The Thorn Birds, both attracting 15 million viewers each.

In 1982, Fininvest bought Italia 1 from Edilio Rusconi. Later, in 1984, it also took over former competitor Rete 4. Following this acquisition, some programmes first seen on Rete 4 moved to Canale 5, such as The Maurizio Costanzo Show, which would go on to be broadcast for over twenty years, and Nonsolomoda.

In October 1984, the National Independent Radio Association filed a complaint against Fininvest, claiming that it had violated the RAI monopoly law. As a result, the group's three networks, including Canale 5, were shut down in the Lazio, Abruzzo and Piedmont regions. However, the Craxi government intervened, issuing a decree later known as the Berlusconi Decree, which repealed the RAI monopoly law. In December 1984, following the blackout, new information-based programmes hosted by Arrigo Levi, Guglielmo Zucconi, Giorgio Bocca and Peter Nichols debuted.

In 1985, the two longest-running programmes on the Mediaset network, Buona Domenica and Forum, started airing.

On 14 January 1987, Canale 5 achieved a historic record, with the prime-time premiere of the film The Woman in Red reaching nearly 13 million viewers, or about 48% of the total audience share.

=== 1990s ===
Following the Mammì law of 1990, Canale 5 and other private national networks obtained permission to broadcast live. The first live broadcasts on the network were Cos'è cos'è, directed by Jocelyn Hattab, Non è la Rai, directed by Gianni Boncompagni and Buona Domenica. Overall, however, Canale 5's programming in the 1990s was similar to that of the previous decade.

Some programmes that aired on Italia 1 were promoted on Canale 5, such as Paperissima - Errori In TV and Scherzi A Parte. However, during this period, much of Canale 5's schedule was self-produced, including Ore 12, Stranamore, Beato Tra Le Donne and Tira & Molla.

There was no shortage of programmes for children and teenagers on Canale 5, such as Bim Bum Bam, broadcast from 1991 to 1997, which featured animated shows from the U.S. and Japan. In the 1993–94 season, A Tutto Disney replaced Bim Bum Bam on Saturday afternoons, offering classic Disney cartoons interspersed with segments and games presented by Irene Ferri and Riccardo Rossi. However, the programme was not very successful, and was eventually cancelled and replaced by Bim Bum Bam. Live-action children's TV series were also broadcast.

In April 1996, Fininvest's various television activities were consolidated under the Mediaset brand.

On 6 May 1997, Michael Jackson was the guest of honor at Canale 5's Telegatti awards ceremony in Milan, where he appeared alongside Luciano Pavarotti.

=== 2000s ===
In 2000, reality shows came to Italy with Grande Fratello, which proved a huge success, with its final episode reaching 16 million viewers, thanks in part to the show's numerous controversies.

Many programmes destined for a long life on the channel first aired during the 2000s, including C'è Posta Per Te presented by Maria De Filippi and Chi vuol essere milionario? (English: Who Wants to Be a Millionaire?), presented by Gerry Scotti. Striscia la notizia, a satirical news program, was also highly lucrative, resulting in the program being repeatedly renewed. Other hits of the period include Stranamore and La Corrida.

On 22 May 2001, Canale 5 updated its logo. This new logo appeared for the first time at the end of an episode of Striscia la notizia. On the same day, the American series The Sopranos premiered in Italy exclusively on Canale 5.

=== 2010s ===
All the network's flagship programmes from previous years were renewed in the 2010s with no change in hosts. In addition, the late evening show Chiambretti Night, hosted by Piero Chiambretti, was moved from Italia 1 to Canale 5.

On 19 September 2012, Canale 5 aired the first match of the UEFA Champions League in HD, using Mediaset's HD channel, which was used generally by Italia 1. Three months later, on 5 December 2012, Canale 5 got its own HD channel, Canale 5 HD.

On 16 April 2018, the channel's logo and branding were updated ahead of the 2018 FIFA World Cup, which was broadcast on the Mediaset networks.

=== 2020s ===
Canale 5 secured the exclusive rights to broadcast the Coppa Italia from 2021 to 2027, starting from the round of 16. They also secured the exclusive rights to broadcast the Supercoppa Italiana from 2021 to 2026.

== Format ==
Since 2003, the channel has been free-to-air over digital terrestrial signals.

In the early 2000s, anyone with a set-top box or Multimedia Home Platform could access Canale 5 Plus, which offered interactive features transmitted through the broadcaster's signal.

During the airing of the movie Remember Me, My Love on 12 May 2009, Canale 5 broadcast in 16:9 format for the first time. However, programmes were still transmitted in 4:3, using letterboxing, on analog terrestrial television and satellite television until 18 July 2012.

Since 1 October 2009, access to Canale 5 over satellite has been encrypted via Mediaguard 2.

== Programming ==
Canale 5, being the flagship channel of Mediaset, has long broadcast a diverse selection of content, including major events such as film festivals and holiday celebrations, as well as news, entertainment, children's shows, and more.

=== News ===
- TG5 (newscast).
- Mattino Cinque (newscast), presented by Federica Panicucci and Francesco Vecchi.
- Pomeriggio Cinque (newscast), presented by Barbara D'Urso.
- Striscia la notizia (satire).

=== Entertainment ===
- Amici di Maria De Filippi (talent show), presented by Maria De Filippi.
- Tu si que vales (talent show).
- Avanti un altro! (game show), presented by Paolo Bonolis.
- Caduta libera (Italian version of the Israeli game show La'uf al HaMillion), presented by Gerry Scotti.
- C'è Posta Per Te (reality show and talk show), presented by Maria de Filippi.
- Uomini e donne (reality show and talk show), presented by Maria de Filippi.
- Forum (legal drama), presented by Barbara Palombelli.

=== Foreign media ===
- Acacias 38 (Spanish soap opera).
- New Amsterdam (American medical drama).
- Laverne & Shirley (American sitcom).
- Married... with Children (American sitcom).
- Roseanne (American sitcom).
- The Baker and the Beauty (American romcom).

=== Children's shows ===
- Bim Bum Bam

=== Animated series ===
- Miracle Girls
- Sailor Moon

In addition, the Catholic Holy Mass is broadcast every Sunday at 10 am.

=== Jingle ===
Canale 5's background music from 1980 to 1993 was composed by Augusto Martelli. From 1993 to 2005, it was composed by Alessandro Radici. The latter tune was released for digital download by Mediaset.

== Announcers ==
Canale 5 has had several continuity announcers over its history. The first such announcer was Eleonora Brigliadori, who was active from September 1980 to May 1984. She was replaced by Fiorella Pierobon, who would go on to be Canale 5's longest-serving announcer, occupying this role for 19 years, from May 1984 to June 2003. Pierobon, in turn, was replaced by Lisa Gritti, who presented from September 2003 to December 2005.

Other announcers on Canale 5 have included Barbara D'Urso (back when Canale 5 was still Telemilano 58), Fabrizia Carminati, Alba Parietti, Paola Perego, Susanna Messaggio, Michela Rocco di Torrepadula and Daniela Castelli.

== Logo history ==
The current logo of the network is a number 5 overlapped by the stylized head of Biscione (a reference to the Visconti family and the city of Milan), from whose mouth, unlike the original, emerges a flower. There is also a second interpretation, according to which the queue of the Biscione is placed at five (even if the 5 is written with a typographical font).

Canale 5's fourth logo used from 1980 to 1981

Canale 5's fifth logo used from 1981 to 1984

Canale 5's sixth logo used from 1984 to 1987

Canale 5's seventh logo used from 1987 to 2001

Canale 5's previous logo from 2001 to 2018

== Management ==
Name	Period
Giorgio Gori	10 June 1991 – 11 May 1997
Gianpaolo Sodano	12 May 1997 – 28 October 1997
Maurizio Costanzo	29 October 1997 – 3 November 1999
Giorgio Gori	4 November 1999 – 29 April 2001
Giovanni Modina	30 April 2001 – 15 October 2006
Massimo Donelli	16 October 2006 – 31 December 2012
Giancarlo Scheri	since 1 January 2013

== Audience share ==
Average daily audience share by month
Year	January	February	March	April	May	June	July	August	September	October	November	December	Average per year
2012	16.73%	16.62%	17.00%	16.78%	15.62%	12.86%	11.80%	11.03%	15.50%	15.93%	15.96%	14.85%	15.05%
2013	16.00%	15.69%	15.62%	14.76%	14.18%	13.39%	12.66%	11.88%	15.35%	16.34%	16.20%	15.14%	14.76%
2014	15.22%	16.07%	17.32%	15.55%	16.18%	13.20%	12.28%	11.69%	14.58%	16.69%	17.32%	15.15%	15.10%
2015	16.10%	16.48%	17.46%	16.21%	16.53%	14.75%	13.59%	12.04%	14.92%	15.65%	15.56%	13.97%	15.27%
2016	15.56%	15.52%	16.60%	17.19%	17.06%	13.85%	13.71%	11.90%	15.48%	16.80%	16.89%	15.25%	15.48%
2017	16.04%	16.06%	16.73%	16.48%	16.63%	14.46%	13.60%	11.73%	14.64%	16.87%	17.10%	15.20%	15.60%
2018	16.32%	16.21%	16.92%	16.63%	16.25%	13.53%	15.46%	11.07%	13.88%	16.16%	17.06%	14.81%	15.47%
2019	15.52%	15.93%	17.04%	16.21%	16.71%	14.80%	13.78%	12.00%	14.63%	16.04%	16.03%	14.86%	15.42%
2020	15.77%	15.82%	14.19%	14.20%	12.12%	14.07%	13.50%	12.22%	13.13%	16.39%	16.26%	14.54%	14.89%
2021	15.42%	16.01%	16.18%	16.54%	15.99%	13.01%	12.53%	12.91%	15.23%	16.67%	17.11%	15.73%	15.09%
2022	16.53%	16.31%	17.16%	15.32%	16.50%	16.08%	14.57%	14.63%	17.61%	18.41%	18.09%	16.46%	16.74%
2023	17.62%	17.59%	19.16%	19.09%	17.65%	16.14%	16.31%	15.47%	17.55%	17.68%	17.76%	17.47%	17.56%
2024	18.09%	17.26%	18.01%	17.73%	17.60%	15.67%	15.72%	14.85%	17.03%	17.65%	17.24%	16.87%	17.07%
2025	17.12%	16.15%	16.97%	16.59%	16.38%	15.71%	18.06%	17.38%	17.86%	19.04%	19.07%	18.41%	17.39%

== See also ==
- Mediaset
- Rete 4
- Italia 1
- Italia 2

== Bibliography ==
- Baroni, Joseph (2005). Dizionario della televisione. Raffaello Cortina Editore. ISBN 88-7078-972-1.
- Grasso, Aldo (2008). Enciclopedia della televisione (3rd ed.). Garzanti Editore. ISBN 978-88-11-50526-6.
- Dotto, Giancarlo (2006). Il mucchio selvaggio. Mondadori. ISBN 978-88-04-53952-0.
