= Switchover Media =

Italian television broadcaster

- Formerly: Fox Kids Italy S.r.l. (2000–2004); Jetix Italy S.r.l. (2005–2009)
- Company type: Private
- Industry: Media
- Founded: 2000; 26 years ago, Rome, Italy
- Defunct: 14 January 2013
- Fate: Folded into Discovery Communications
- Successor: Warner Bros. Discovery EMEA
- Headquarters: Via Salaria 222, 00198 Rome
- Key people: Francesco Nespega
- Products: Television channels
- Parent: Jetix Europe N.V. (2001–2009)
- Website: switchovermedia.it

Switchover Media (SOM) was an Italian broadcaster of television channels. The company first operated as a subsidiary of Netherlands-based broadcaster Jetix Europe to being purchased out by its management and rebranding to Switchover Media in June 2009, to its purchase and folding by Discovery Communications in January 2013.

== History ==
=== Fox Kids/Jetix ===
Fox Kids Italy S.r.l. was originally founded as a subsidiary of Fox Kids Europe N.V. in 2000 to help control the Italian Fox Kids feed. A syndicated Fox Kids analogue block was launched in 2001, airing programmes for a few hours a day. A one-hour-timeshift of Fox Kids would later launch, being one of only 2 Fox Kids timeshift channels in the world (the other being in the United Kingdom).

In 2004, as part of a worldwide partnership between Fox Kids Europe, Fox Kids Latin America and ABC Family Worldwide that would rebrand their operations under a single brand name titled Jetix, the company was renamed Jetix Italia S.r.l. The rebrand began with the syndicated Fox Kids block being renamed K-2 on October 1, while the channel's rebrand to Jetix happened in March 2005.

In May 2005, a sister channel titled GXT launched, which focused on a teenage to young-adult audience. A 1-hour-timeshift of GXT launched on June 1, 2008, exclusively on Sky Italia.

=== As Switchover Media ===
On 8 December 2008, Disney made an agreement to increase ownership in Jetix Italy's parent company Jetix Europe to 96%, and eventually purchased the remainder of the company and had them delisted from Euronext.

On 1 July 2009, K-2 was rebranded as simply K2, and launched as a standalone free-to-air broadcast network.

On 15 July 2009, Jetix Italy S.r.l. announced a management buyout from Jetix Europe under the name of Switchover Media, and would purchase the GXT and K2 networks and blocks from The Walt Disney Company. The company also agreed to operate Jetix Italy for Disney until its rebranding as Disney XD Italy would go to fruition.

In June 2010, Switchover launched a channel aimed at a young male audience, titled Frisbee, which was broadcast on Sky Italia and Digital terrestrial television.

In 2012, Switchover moved out of the youth market with the launch of two specialized adult skewing channels. On May 14, the company launched Giallo, a focused channel with crime drama, thrillers and whodunits programming from the US and Europe. In the Summer, the company under an agreement with Gruner+Jahr/Mondadori launched Focus on Italian digital terrestrial television, based on the popular science magazine of the same name. The channel is aimed at a male audience and factual-based programming.

In January 2013, Switchover was acquired by Discovery Communications (now Warner Bros. Discovery). GXT and its timeshift both ceased broadcasting on 31 December 2014.

== Channels ==
- Jetix, Kids channel (Rebranded as Disney XD on 28 September 2009, owned by Disney until it closed down on 1 October 2019)
- Jetix +1, 1-hour timeshift service (Rebranded as Disney XD +1 on 28 September 2009, owned by Disney until it closed down on 1 October 2019)
- GXT, male focused pay channel (Closed in December 2014)
- GXT +1, 1-hour timeshift service (Closed in December 2014)
- K2, general kids channel
- Frisbee, general kids channel
- Giallo, free to air investigation-themed channel
- Focus, a male-skewed factual entertainment channel
