= Senato della Repubblica (TV channel) =

- Country: Italy
- Broadcast area: Italy
- Headquarters: Rome, Italy

Programming
- Language(s): Italian

Ownership
- Owner: Italian Senate
- Sister channels: Camera dei Deputati

History
- Launched: September 2003

Links
- Website: www.senato.it

Availability

Terrestrial
- Digital: Channel 10,150,158 (No longer available in Rome); Channel 10, 122,200 (Longer Available from Broadcaster Area)

Streaming media
- Senato TV: WMP RealPlayer

Senato della Repubblica is an Italian TV channel dedicated to broadcast live coverage of Italian Senate from Palazzo Madama in Rome, Italy.
