= Italia 1 =

Italian television channel

- Logo used since 2018
- Country: Italy
- Broadcast area: Italy, reaching bordering regions via overspill of the Italian terrestrial network
- Headquarters: Milan, Italy

Programming
- Language: Italian
- Picture format: 1080i HDTV

Ownership
- Owner: Mediaset (MFE - MediaForEurope)
- Sister channels: Italia 2 Rete 4 Canale 5; 20; Iris; 27 Twentyseven; La5; Cine34; Focus; Top Crime; Boing; Boing Plus; Cartoonito; TGcom24; Mediaset Extra

History
- Launched: 3 January 1982; 44 years ago

Links
- Website: Italia 1

Availability

Terrestrial
- Digital terrestrial television: Channel 6 (HD)

Streaming media
- Mediaset Infinity: Italia 1

Italia 1 (Italian pronunciation [iˈtaːlja ˈuːno]) is an Italian free-to-air television channel on the Mediaset network, owned by MFE - MediaForEurope. It is aimed at both a young adult and adult audience.

Italia 1 was launched on 3 January 1982 and, was originally owned by Rusconi; after a few months, however, due to the aggressive dumping practices of Silvio Berlusconi's rival network Canale 5, Rusconi was forced to sell the majority of his company to Fininvest, allowing Berlusconi to further strengthen his media holdings.

== History ==
=== Launch and early years ===
Launched on 3 January 1982 by print media editor Edilio Rusconi, Italia 1 was born from the idea of a network supported by twenty regional broadcasting stations, some owned by Rusconi himself and others simply affiliated to broadcast throughout Italian territory on the 'ploy' of interconnection. The lead broadcasting station is Milan-based Antenna Nord, but Rome's Quinta Rete also played an important role. Lillo Tombolini was the executive director, and the channel's presenter was a young Gabriella Golia, who was already the face of Antenna Nord.

During its early years, Rusconi's growing national channel started its programming at noon, with a segment dedicated to children's programming, during which various animated shows (particularly western cartoons) were broadcast, as well as successful original television series such as Star Trek. In the early afternoon, air-time was then given to region-specific broadcasts, and later on, more television series and a mid-afternoon children's programming block called Bim Bum Bam, which offered numerous cartoons and animated series over the years, mostly American imports, such as The Smurfs, Snorks, Count Duckula, Police Academy, Iznogoud, Inspector Gadget, Batman: The Animated Series, Spiff and Hercules, and Alvin and the Chipmunks among others.

In the late afternoon hours, the channel again broadcasts from local stations, alongside airing an episode of a television series the following hour (such as Paper Moon. Generally in the early evening hours, two movies and one television series was broadcast. The network also offered plenty of air-time to sport programs dedicated to soccer, boxing, basketball and motor racing, including Andrea De Adamich's Grand Prix. Primetime hours on Italia 1 were dedicated to predominantly American imports such as Falcon Crest, Kojak, The Big Valley, Project UFO, and Mork & Mindy.

On 23 April 1982, an official agreement was made between Gruppo Rusconi and the American network CBS for technical assistance and program sharing. However, only a few months after its appearance on a national scale, funds began to dwindle, mostly due to exorbitant costs of managing broadcast transmission systems, something a print editing house such as Rusconi probably wasn't aware of, but also due to the aggressive advertising policy from its main rival network, Canale 5. In fact, Rusconi's network relied on an external advertising provider, La Publikompass, to sell advertising space while Berlusconi's channel took advantage of owning its own advertising provider, Publitalia, which could easily personalise ad packages to clients using dumping practices.

On 6 September 1982, Rusconi signed a collaboration agreement with Silvio Berlusconi, the owner of Canale 5, mainly focusing on a common policy for the management of advertising limits but also concerning the communal use of high frequency networks and the sharing of some programs. However, on 30 November of that same year, the Rusconi group were forced to sell the network for about 29 billion lire (approximately €15 million) to Berlusconi, who merged it with "Rete 10", also owned by Berlusconi, to found the new Italia 1, which, according to the Fininvest company, is geared towards a young audience.

== Audience ==
=== Share 24h* Italia 1 ===
Below, average monthly listening data in the total day received by the issuer.

	January	February	March	April	May	June	July	August	September	October	November	December	Average (per year)
2008													10.83%
2009	9.85%	9.63%	-	10.51%	10.56%	12.09%	11.66%	11.15%	10.68%	10.23%	9.71%	9.39%	10.50%
2010	9.00%	8.67%	9.09%	9.35%	9.71%	9.49%	9.85%	9.39%	9.22%	8.97%	8.97%	8.62%	9.19%
2011	8.25%	7.92%	8.24%	8.31%	8.37%	8.89%	9.01%	8.57%	8.20%	3.70%		8.58%	
2012	7.85%	7.54%	7.64%	7.89%	7.81%	7.62%	7.44%	6.84%	7.20%	6.98%	6.62%	6.46%	7.33%
2013	6.47%	6.43%	6.58%	6.34%	6.59%	6.75%	6.69%	6.45%	6.63%	6.43%	6.49%	6.54%	6.53%
2014	6.15%	6.04%	6.10%	5.84%	5.63%	5.71%	6.08%	6.44%	6.25%	5.95%	5.75%	6.05%	5.99%
2015	5.54%	5.46%	5.95%	5.94%	5.47%	5.79%	5.92%	5.84%	5.51%	5.53%	5.56%	5.44%	5.66%
2016	5.52%	5.07%	5.33%	5.27%	4.97%	4.91%	5.40%	5.10%	5.11%	5.20%	5.33%	5.45%	5.22%
2017	5.00%	4.80%	5.19%	5.00%	4.96%	5.00%	5.16%	4.96%	4.77%	5.04%	4.98%	5.23%	5.01%
2018	4.67%	4.69%	5.13%	4.77%	4.65%	9.10%	4.62%	4.62%	4.38%	4.65%	4.63%	4.61%	5.00%
2019	4.57%	4.47%	4.78%	4.85%	4.39%	4.50%	4.65%	5.07%	4.89%	5.26%	5.26%	5.41%	4.83%
2020	4.87%	4.34%	5.04%	4.87%	4.54%	4.63%	4.71%	4.87%	4.66%	4.70%	4.75%	4.84%	4.73%
2021	4.38%	4.50%	4.53%	4.54%	4.39%	4.21%	4.36%	4.51%	4.20%	4.15%	4.14%	4.25%	

- Average Monthly Day on Target Individuals 4+

== Directors of Italia 1 ==
Name	Period
Carlo Freccero	20 April 1987 – 13 September 1992
Carlo Vetrugno	14 September 1992 – 11 May 1997
Giorgio Gori	12 May 1997 – 2 May 1999
Roberto Giovalli	3 May 1999 – 4 February 2001
Stefano Magnaghi	5 February 2001 – 19 May 2002
Luca Tiraboschi	20 May 2002 – 2 November 2014
Laura Casarotto	since 3 November 2014

== Network's faces ==
In the past, Italia 1 had continuity announcers. As mentioned earlier, the network's main announcer was Gabriella Golia, who served for 20 years from 1982 to 2002 (Golia was also continuity announcer of Antenna Nord). Other continuity announcers for Italia 1 included Veronica Ghinzani from 1982 to 1984, Manuela Blanchard Beillard in the early 1980s, Fiorella Pierobon from 1982 to 1984 (then official announcer of Canale 5), and Licia Colò from 1982 to 1985. In 2002, Italia 1 removed continuity announcers from the network altogether (the same thing happened in Canale 5 in December 2005).

The voice of Italia 1's promos for many years was Fabrizio Casadio, who announced them from 9 January 1984 to 5 October 1997. Since 1 January 2009, promotions are announced by Raffaele Farina.
