= Camera dei Deputati (TV channel) =

- Country: Italy
- Broadcast area: Italy
- Headquarters: Rome, Italy

Programming
- Language(s): Italian

Ownership
- Owner: Italian Chamber of Deputies
- Sister channels: Senato della Repubblica

History
- Launched: 1996

Links
- Website: www.camera.it

Availability

Terrestrial
- Digital: No longer available

Streaming media
- Camera.it: WMP RealPlayer

Camera dei Deputati is an Italian TV channel dedicated to broadcast live coverage of Italian Chamber of Deputies from Palazzo Montecitorio in Rome, Italy.
