= Nove (TV channel) =

- Country: Italy
- Broadcast area: Italy

Programming
- Languages: Italian; English
- Picture format: 1080i HDTV (downscaled to 576i for the SD feed)

Ownership
- Owner: Warner Bros. Discovery EMEA
- Sister channels: Discovery; Discovery Turbo; DMAX; Food Network; Frisbee; Giallo; HGTV; K2; Real Time

History
- Launched: 28 July 2011; 15 years ago
- Replaced: DeeJay TV
- Former names: Deejay TV (July 28, 2011 - February 22, 2016); Deejay TV - Nove (February 22, 2016 — October 3, 2016)

Links
- Website: nove.tv

Availability

Terrestrial
- Digital terrestrial television: Channel 9 (HD); Channel 109/509 (SD)

Streaming media
- Discovery+: Nove HD

Nove (stylised as N9VE) is an Italian general entertainment cable television channel owned by Warner Bros. Discovery EMEA. Originally known as Deejay TV, the channel was renamed and its logo redesigned on 22 February 2016. It offers programming aimed to appeal to the general audience and made available through Italian television LCN 9 (nove in Italian means "nine").

== History ==
The channel was acquired by Discovery Italia following the agreement with Gruppo L'Espresso occurred January 22, 2015 for the sale to the latter of All Music S.p.A.

With the move to Discovery Italia, channel schedule changes radically, with the airing of programs and documentaries have been broadcast on DMAX, Real Time and Focus, films and some sporting events while keeping up in February 2016 the old name Deejay TV (of which L'Espresso Group maintains ownership of the brand) and the show Deejay Chiama Italia (still on the air).

On 9 September 2015 the channel undergoes a restyling and the new slogan is In caso di noia premere 9 (translated, "in case of boredom, press 9"). In particular, the new graphics are entirely focused on the number Nine, namely the LCN of the channel.

Since February 22, 2016 the channel changed its name to Nove (as already seen in the idents) making the old Deejay TV logo smaller and the web portal became nove.tv.

On October 26, 2018 the HD channel 509 was pulled from digital terrestrial leaving only the SD channel on its place which unlike the HD counterpart it only carries the single Italian audio. The HD version still remains available on satellite in both Italian and English audio.

== Programming ==
=== Current programming ===
- 1000 modi per morire (1000 Ways to Die)
- Alieni: Nuove rivelazioni (Unsealed Alien Files)
- American Horror Story
- Affari in valigia (Baggage Battles)
- Appuntamenti da incubo (Dates from Hell)
- Airport Security (Border Security: Australia's Front Line)
- Airport Security: Canada (Border Security: Canada's Front Line)
- Bad Dog!
- Che tempo che fa (2023-today)
- Chi diavolo ho sposato? (Who the (Bleep) Did I Marry?)
- Ci sei o ci fai? (World's Craziest Fools)
- Clio Makeup
- Come andrà a finire? (What Happened Next?)
- Come è fatto (How It's Made)
- Come è fatto il cibo (Food Factory)
- Crimini del cuore (Scorned: Love Kills)
- Destroyed in Seconds
- Disappeared
- Effetto rallenty (Time Warp)
- Flip That House
- Ghost Asylum
- Il mio gatto è indemoniato (My Cat from Hell)
- Incontri alieni (When Aliens Attack)
- Io e i miei parassiti (Monsters Inside Me)
- Jack on Tour
- Killer Karaoke
- LA Ink
- La grande notte della boxe
- La mia nuova casa sull'albero (Treehouse Masters)
- Lavori sporchi (Dirty Jobs)
- Law & Order
- L'isola di Adamo ed Eva (Adam Zkt. Eva)
- Malattie Misteriose (Mystery Diagnosis)
- Megalodonte: la leggenda degli abissi (Megalodon: The Monster Shark Lives)
- Milionario in incognito (The Secret Millionaire)
- Nudi e crudi (Naked and Afraid)
- Nudi a prima vista (Dating Naked)
- Paint Your Life
- Prigionieri di viaggio (Banged Up Abroad)
- Property Wars
- Sex ER: tutta colpa del sesso (Sex Sent Me to the ER)
- Sirene: il mistero svelato (Mermaids: The Body Found)
- Tabatha mani di forbice (Tabatha Takes Over)
- Te l'avevo detto (You Have Been Warned)
- Torte in corso con Renato
- Total Wipeout
- Unexplained Files
