= Caccia e Pesca =

Italy-based television channel

- Country: Italy
- Broadcast area: Italy

Programming
- Language: Italian
- Picture format: 16:9 SDTV

Ownership
- Owner: Digicast

History
- Launched: 2004

Links
- Website: www.cacciaepesca.tv

Caccia e Pesca (Hunting and Fishing) is an Italy-based premium television channel dedicated to programmes on hunting and fishing.
