= Rete 4 =

Italian television channel

- Logo used since 2018
- Country: Italy
- Broadcast area: Italy, reaching bordering regions via overspill of the Italian terrestrial network

Programming
- Picture format: 1080i HDTV (downscaled to 576i for the SDTV feed)

Ownership
- Owner: Arnoldo Mondadori Editore (until mid-80s); Mediaset (MFE - MediaForEurope)
- Sister channels: Canale 5 Italia 1; 20; Iris; 27 Twentyseven; La5; Cine34; Focus; Top Crime; Boing; Boing Plus; Cartoonito; Italia 2 TGcom24; Mediaset Extra

History
- Launched: 4 January 1982; 44 years ago

Links
- Website: mediasetplay.it/rete4

Availability

Terrestrial
- Digital terrestrial television: Channel 4 (HD)

Streaming media
- Mediaset Infinity: Rete 4

Rete 4 [ˈreːte ?'kwattro] (in English Network 4, also known as Retequattro) is an Italian free-to-air television channel operated by Mediaset and owned by MFE - MediaForEurope. The channel's current director is Sebastiano Lombardi.

== Logos ==
Rete 4's first logo from 1982 to 1991. First animated ident created by Roberto Shimose, from Globograph.

Rete 4's second logo from 1991 to 1999

Rete 4's third logo from 1999 to 2018

== Audience ==
=== Share 24h* Rete 4 ===
Below, average monthly listening data in the total day received by the issuer.

Year	Jan	Feb	Mar	Apr	May	Jun	Jul	Ago	Sep	Oct	Nov	Dec	Media year
2007			6.45%										2.98%
2008													8.28%
2009	8.33%	7.63%	-	7.96%	8.26%	7.76%	7.92%	7.42%	7.47%	7.62%	7.49%	7.69%	7.78%
2010	7.76%	7.42%	7.48%	7.58%	7.40%	7.00%	7.08%	7.43%	6.79%	7.28%	7.35%	7.00%	7.30%
2011	6.95%	6.74%	6.88%	6.66%	6.83%	7.16%	6.34%	6.67%	6.58%	6.55%	6.48%	6.32%	6.68%
2012	6.18%	6.12%	6.39%	6.69%	6.70%	5.92%	5.51%	5.42%	5.72%	5.62%	5.50%	5.22%	5.94%
2013	5.29%	4.98%	5.30%	5.41%	5.34%	5.00%	4.77%	4.67%	4.80%	4.72%	4.93%	4.81%	5.02%
2014	4.78%	4.78%	5.14%	5.20%	4.94%	4.92%	4.60%	4.54%	4.66%	4.91%	5.03%	4.59%	4.85%
2015	4.71%	4.69%	4.92%	5.05%	5.07%	4.80%	4.41%	4.04%	4.14%	4.34%	4.58%	4.19%	4.59%
2016	4.20%	4.22%	4.26%	4.20%	4.37%	4.31%	4.16%	3.70%	4.03%	4.07%	4.04%	3.85%	4.12%
2017	4.05%	3.84%	4.04%	3.95%	4.01%	4.25%	4.27%	3.70%	3.94%	3.89%	3.92%	3.70%	3.96%
2018	3.88%	3.83%	3.92%	3.75%	3.88%	3.85%	3.88%	3.66%	3.83%	3.80%	3.83%	3.69%	3.82%
2019	3.91%	3.72%	3.86%	3.79%	3.94%	4.04%	3.90%	3.59%	3.98%	4.11%	4.18%	4.07%	3.93%
2020	3.89%	3.65%	3.82%	3.87%	3.90%	3.99%	3.72%	3.57%	3.77%	3.72%	3.74%	3.60%	3.77%
2021	3.77%	3.75%	3.63%	3.86%	3.89%	4.12%	3.79%	3.63%	3.86%	3.74%	3.64%	3.63%	3.79%
2022
