= Focus (Italian magazine) =

Monthly popular science magazine in Milan, Italy

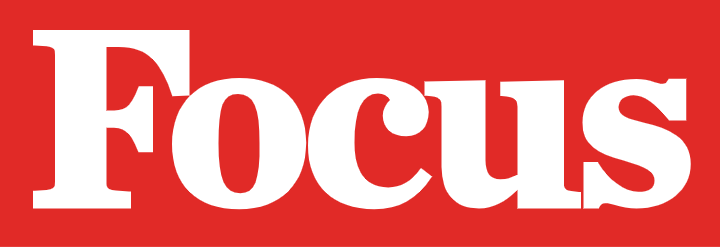
- Editor: Jacopo Loredan
- Frequency: Monthly
- Circulation: 477.366 (2010)
- Founded: 1992; 34 years ago
- Company: Gruner + Jahr; Arnoldo Mondadori Editore
- Country: Italy
- Based in: Milan
- Language: Italian
- Website: www.focus.it

Focus is an Italian monthly popular science magazine published in Milan, Italy. It has been in circulation since 1992.

== History and profile ==
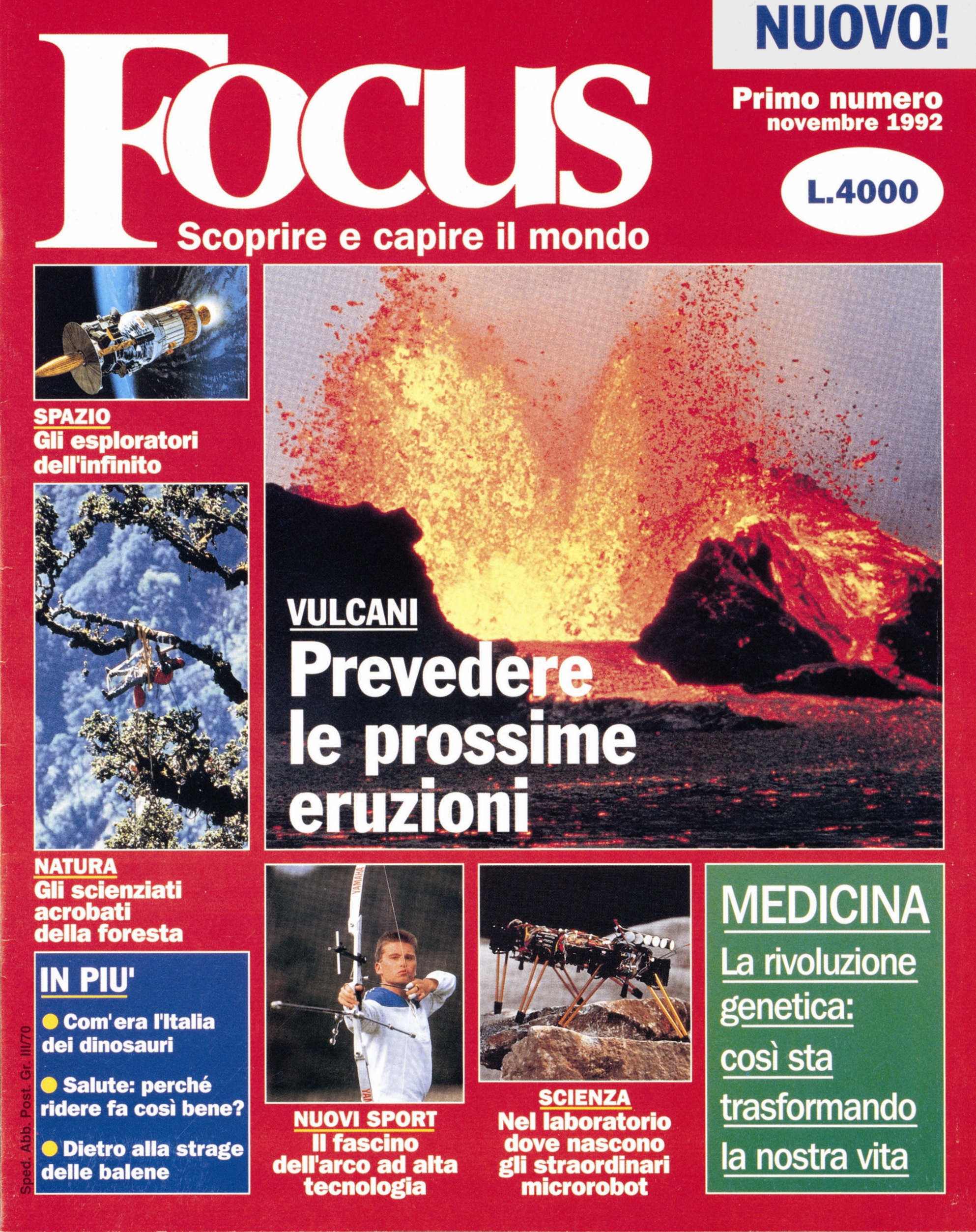
Cover of the first issue of Focus (November 1992)

Focus was established in 1992. The magazine is published monthly by Arnoldo Mondadori Editore. It includes articles about science, technology, history, health, and social issues. Since 1999 the magazine offers Focus Extra, an occasional special supplement. Jacopo Loredan is the editor of the monthly.

== Circulation ==
The circulation of Focus was 748,000 copies in 2004. Between February 2006 and January 2007 the magazine sold 608,600 copies. Its circulation was 616,080 copies in 2007. The magazine had a circulation of 477,366 copies in 2010.

== See also ==
- List of magazines published in Italy
