= Discovery Turbo (Italy) =

- Country: Italy
- Broadcast area: Italy, Switzerland
- Network: Warner Bros. Discovery EMEA

Programming
- Language: Italian
- Picture format: 1080i HDTV

Ownership
- Sister channels: Nove; Discovery; DMAX; Food Network; Frisbee; Giallo; HGTV; K2; Real Time

History
- Launched: 29 April 2018
- Replaced: Focus (channel 56); Alpha (channel 59)
- Former names: Motor Trend (2018–2026)

Links
- Website: discoveryturbo.it

Availability

Terrestrial
- Digital terrestrial television: Channel 59 (HD)

Streaming media
- Discovery+: Discovery Turbo HD

Discovery Turbo is an Italian automotive interest television channel owned by Warner Bros. Discovery Italia.

== History ==
The channel began broadcasting on 29 April 2018, replacing Focus after the end of that brand licensing agreement, which was taken over by Mediaset.

On 1 April 2019, Motor Trend was converted to HD on satellite.

On 21 December 2019, Motor Trend replaced Alpha on channel 59 of DTT. On channel 56, it was replaced by HGTV on 2 February 2020.

On 1 July 2021, following a reorganization of some Sky channels, HGTV moved to LCN 419.

On 4 January 2026, Motor Trend rebranded as Discovery Turbo.

== Programming ==
- Chasing Classic Cars
- Wheeler Dealers
- American Chopper
- Bike N' Furious: pazzi a due ruote
- Car Crash Tv
- Come ti rifaccio l'auto
- Diesel Brothers
- Driving Wild
- Fast N' Loud
- Gli eroi dell'asfalto
- Goblin garage
- I re della strada
- Iron garage
- L'impero delle macchine
- Meccanici allo Sbando
- Mega Race
- Mega trasporti
- Mega veicoli
- Officine da Incubo
- Real Fast, Real Furious
- Salt Lake Garage
- Supercar: auto da sogno
