= MediaForEurope =

Italian mass media company

MFE – MediaForEurope N.V.
- Formerly: Mediaset S.r.l. (1993–1994); Mediaset S.p.A. (1994–2021); Mediaset N.V. (2021)
- Type: Naamloze vennootschap (N.V.)
- Traded as: BIT: MFEB; BIT: MFEA; BMAD: MFEA; FTSE Italia Mid Cap
- ISIN: NL0015001OI1
- Industry: Mass media
- Predecessors: Reti Televisive Italiane; Elettronica Industriale; Reteitalia; Videotime; Silvio Berlusconi Communications; Gestevisión Telecinco; Kirch Group (for ProSieben Sat.1 Media assets)
- Founded: 15 December 1993; 32 years ago (as Gruppo Mediaset); 25 November 2021; 4 years ago (as MFE – MediaForEurope)
- Founder: Silvio Berlusconi
- Headquarters: Cologno Monzese, Italy
- Key people: Fedele Confalonieri (chairperson); Pier Silvio Berlusconi (CEO); Marco Giordani (CFO)
- Revenue: 4.03 billion € (2025)
- Net income: 301 million € (2025)
- Owner: Fininvest (49.3%); Simon Fiduciaria (19.2%); Vivendi (4.6%); Treasury stock (3.1%); Public float (23.7%)
- Number of employees: 4990 (2021)
- Subsidiaries: Mediaset S.p.A. Mediaset España; ProSiebenSat.1 Media (75.61%)
- Website: www.mfemediaforeurope.com

MFE – MediaForEurope N.V., commonly referred to as MediaForEurope, formerly Mediaset Group (Italian: Gruppo Mediaset), is an Italian multinational media and communications company which is majority-owned by the Berlusconi family's Fininvest Group. MFE specialises primarily in free-to-air and pay-TV production and distribution on multiple platforms, as well as in film and multimedia production and distribution, and advertising sales. It has operations in Italy (through Mediaset S.p.A.) and Spain (through Mediaset España); it is also the largest single shareholder in ProSiebenSat.1 Media (Germany) at 75.61%.

Its registered office is in Amsterdam, the Netherlands, while its management, operational, administrative and tax headquarters are located in Cologno Monzese, in the metropolitan city of Milan, Italy. Since 1994 the president of MFE is Fedele Confalonieri.

The group has been listed on the Milan Stock Exchange since 1996 and the majority shareholder is Fininvest, a holding company founded in the 1970s by Silvio Berlusconi. It is the second largest private television group in Europe after the Luxembourg-based RTL Group and the first in Italy. In terms of turnover it is among the most important in the global media market. In 2010 it was ranked the best Italian media group and fifth largest in Europe in the Thomson Reuters Extel ranking. In 2013 it was ranked the 34th largest media group in the world.

== History ==
=== Background ===
==== Beginnings in Italy ====
Silvio Berlusconi's involvement in television industry began in 1978, with Telemilano, a local Milan-based broadcaster that became Canale 5 two years later and began broadcasting nationally. Berlusconi went on to acquire Italia 1 (from the publishing group Rusconi) in 1982, and Rete 4 (from Arnoldo Mondadori Editore) in 1984. These three networks eventually formed Reti Televisive Italiane (RTI).

==== Early international expansions ====
Berlusconi's Fininvest maintained its stake in the French television channel La Cinq throughout its existence: from its formation in 1985 to official launch on 20 February 1986 until its closure on 12 April 1992.

In the 1980s, Fininvest was contracted to operate TV Koper-Capodistria, a TV station which was intended to serve Italian-speaking audiences in the region of Istria, Slovenia, Yugoslavia, but was widely available in Italy through cable systems. Under Fininvest's control, the station mainly operated as a sports channel. This arrangement ended in 1990.

In 1987, Berlusconi began purchasing a stake in German television music channel Musicbox, increasing it up to 45%. It became the first incarnation of the generalist channel Tele 5 on 11 January 1988. Tele 5 was later sold to Leo Kirch, and became Deutsches Sportfernsehen (DSF, now Sport1) on 1 January 1993.

Fininvest joined in the Gestevisión Telecinco consortium, which was formed on 10 March 1989 to participate in the auction of commercial television broadcast license. The 10-year license was issued on 25 August 1989, and what would become Telecinco was launched on 3 March 1990.

In 1990, Silvio Berlusconi Communications entered into a partnership with DIC Enterprises and having SBC subsidiaries Reteitalia S.p.A. and Telecinco to co-produce shows, a relationship that lasted until 1994.

=== As Mediaset Group (1996 – November 2021) ===
==== Formation ====
Branding the company under his own image and having prior experience with the cable broadcasting industry during his time in Milan, Berlusconi expanded into many media ventures such as television, film and radio industries; and in 1996, RTI, Videotime, Publitalia and Elettronica Industriale were brought together in a single group, Mediaset, which was then listed on the Milan stock exchange, opening up the company to both important institutional investors and private investors (around 300,000).

In 1997, Mediaset acquired 25% stake in the Spanish broadcaster Gestevisión Telecinco. In 2003, Mediaset increased its stake in Telecinco and became the major shareholder with 50.1% of the shares. On 24 June 2004, Gestevisión Telecinco was listed on the Madrid stock exchange.

In 2007, Mediaset formed a consortium with Cyrte Fund and Goldman Sachs, and acquired a controlling interest in Endemol from Telefónica. The Dutch production company buys Italian film production and distribution company Medusa Film. In 2008, they reached an agreement regarding the acquisition of Taodue.

Mediaset entered the Chinese market by obtaining the licence to sell advertisements for China Global Media which in October launched the sports channel China Sports Programs Network (CSPN), a consortium of seven regional broadcasters with an audience reach of 400 million viewers. Publieurope, a subsidiary of Mediaset's advertising agency Publitalia '80, would handle the sales of advertisements on the network.

==== Major expansion in Spain ====
On 18 December 2009 Mediaset S.p.A., its subsidiary Gestevisión Telecinco, and Prisa (parent company of Sogecable) approved and signed an agreement to merge their television operations (Telecinco and Cuatro), pending regulatory approval. As part of the agreement, Gestevisión Telecinco would take a 22% shareholding in the Digital+ platform. The Comisión Nacional de la Competencia (the Spanish antitrust commission), with a resolution dated 28 October 2010, approved the merger. Following this, Gestevision Telecinco was renamed Mediaset España Comunicación on 11 March 2011.

In 2019, Mediaset Italia S.p.A. was formed to handle the group's businesses within Italy. The particular company became the current iteration of Mediaset S.p.A. in 2022.

==== Acquisition of stake in ProSiebenSat.1 Media ====
In May 2019, Mediaset invests 330 million euros to take over 9.6% of ProSiebenSat.1 Media (P7S1) without having a role in the management. In November 2019, Mediaset rises to 15.1% of the German broadcaster. The transaction took place through the subsidiary Mediaset España, which acquired a 5.5% stake in the capital, which is added to the shares already in the group's portfolio. On 23 March 2020, Mediaset España purchased a further 4.28% of the share capital equal to 4.35% of the voting rights, bringing Mediaset's stake to 20.1% and showing the ambition to want to participate in the governance of the issuer thanks also to the 10% held by the Czech magnate Daniel Křetínský, considered by analysts to be close to Pier Silvio Berlusconi in this match, in order to form a European pole of generalist TV. A few days later, on 28 March, the CEO of P7S1, Max Conze, resigned from board of directors. Rainer Beaujean took his place.

In January 2021, Mediaset signs a collaborative contract with the Romanian IT and telecommunications company DeltaLab S.A. for the construction of fiber optic network infrastructures around the world €196,000,000,000 project that will bring the high-speed line even in areas where there is no connection. the construction will take about 3 years with the help of construction companies in the various territories. When the works are finished it will be the largest infrastructure in the world, the infrastructures will be owned 30% by Mediaset and 70% by DeltaLab which will provide the connection as a direct supplier.

=== As MFE (November 2021–present) ===
In 2019, Mediaset announced a major restructuring, under which it would form a new parent company, MFE – MediaForEurope N.V., which would be domiciled in the Netherlands. On 26 November 2021, the company's board approved the rename.

In 2022, after a bid for the 44% pool of shares it did not already hold, MFE completed the takeover of Mediaset España, ending up with roughly a 83% of shares of the company, with the following stated goal being the full merger of Spanish operations with the Milan-based company. In late January 2023, MFE announced that it would go ahead with Mediaset España merger plan, and offered to pay €3.2687 per share in the Madrid-based broadcaster. It also announced that it will give seven MFE class A shares per one Mediaset España share to investors who backed the merger. On 14 March 2023, MFE offered to buy a 1.05% stake in Mediaset España held by Vivendi for €10.7 million. The following day, 15 March 2023, the shareholders of Mediaset España approved MFE's absorption plan in an extraordinary general meeting, but José Antonio del Barrio Colmanarejo accused the managers of "failing to defend the interests of shareholders in the face of what he saw as an undervaluation of the company".

On 28 April 2023, it was reported that MFE's absorption of Mediaset España was expected to be completed on 3 May. 2 May 2023 was Mediaset España's last day of trading; the Spanish subsidiary's final stock price was €2.89 per share, before the company was delisted from Spanish stock exchanges on the following day, 3 May. Mediaset España's shareholders were offered seven newly issued class A shares of MFE per one Mediaset España share. In total, 220,934,896 new class A shares were issued, with a nominal value of €0.06 each.

== Key assets ==
MFE – MediaForEurope ownership and subsidiaries chart

Finanziaria d'investimento Fininvest S.p.A. (47.91%)	Simon Fiduciaria S.p.A. (18.68%)	Vivendi SE (4.49%)	Treasury stock (3.56%)	Public float (25.35%)
MFE – MediaForEurope N.V.
Impresa SA (32.94%)	Nessma Broadcast SA (32.27%) & Nessma SA (34.12%)	EI Towers S.p.A. (40%)	Mediaset S.p.A. (100%)	Grupo Audiovisual; Mediaset España; Comunicación, S.A.U. (100%)	ProSiebenSat.1; Media SE (75.61%) (Note: Stake of 28.87% of the share capital through 26.58% direct ownership and 2.29% secured by financial instruments.)
Reti Televisive; Italiane S.p.A. (100%)	Publitalia '80 S.p.A. (100%)

Chart indicators
- Solid lines indicate companies consolidated on a line-by-line basis
- Dashed lines indicate companies consolidated by equity method
- Dotted lines indicate other investments

=== Mediaset S.p.A. (Italy) ===
- Rete 4
- Canale 5
- Italia 1

=== Grupo Audiovisual Mediaset España Comunicación, S.A.U. (Spain) ===
- Cuatro
- Telecinco

=== ProSiebenSat.1 Media SE (Germany, 75.61%) ===
- Germany
  - Sat.1
  - ProSieben
  - Kabel Eins
  - Sixx
- Switzerland
  - Puls 8
- Austria
  - ATV
  - Puls 4
