= Tivùsat =

Italian digital satellite television platform

tivùsat
- Type: Free-to-air and free-to-view satellite television platform
- Country: Italy
- Headquarters: Rome, Italy
- Broadcast area: Italy; San Marino; Vatican City
- Owner: tivù S.r.l.
- Parent: RAI; Mediaset; TIM; Associazione TV Locali; Aeranti-Corallo
- Key people: Alberto Sigismondi (president); Stefano Luppi (delegated director)
- Launch date: 31 July 2009; 17 years ago
- Official website: www.tivusat.tv
- Language: Italian

Tivùsat (stylised as tivùsat; a name combining the Italian phonetic spelling of "TV" with an abbreviation of "satellite") is an Italian free-to-air and free-to-view digital satellite television platform operated by tivù S.r.l. The company is jointly owned by RAI, Mediaset, TIM, Associazione TV Locali and Aeranti Corallo. It was established in 2008 to promote digital terrestrial television in Italy and to develop a satellite platform capable of reaching the whole of Italy, including areas not adequately covered by terrestrial television signals.

The platform launched on 31 July 2009 as a free satellite complement to Italy's digital terrestrial television service. It carries national and regional Italian television and radio services alongside a selection of international channels. Its domestic programming is predominantly in the Italian language, while international services may broadcast in other languages. The platform's service regulations define its authorised national area as Italy, San Marino and Vatican City.

Tivùsat does not charge a monthly fee or require a television subscription. The platform combines unencrypted free-to-air services with encrypted free-to-view services made available without a recurring charge. Reception of the complete service requires a satellite dish directed towards Eutelsat's Hot Bird satellites at 13° east, a certified satellite receiver or conditional-access module used with a compatible television, and an activated Tivùsat smart card. Smart cards are supplied with certified receivers or conditional-access modules rather than being sold separately.

== History ==
Tivù S.r.l. was incorporated on 24 September 2008 and became operational in January 2009. At launch, Tivùsat retransmitted the principal free television services available through Italy's digital terrestrial platform and was intended particularly for places where terrestrial reception was unavailable or incomplete.

By the end of 2009, approximately 100,000 Tivùsat smart cards had been activated, while 260,000 cards had been supplied to manufacturers of certified receivers and television equipment.

== Technology and access ==
Tivùsat supports standard-definition, high-definition and 4K Ultra HD television services. Certified receivers and compatible televisions may also provide an electronic programme guide and interactive applications.

The smart card functions as a conditional-access key for channels encrypted because of territorial broadcasting rights. The platform has used different generations of conditional-access technology, including cards based on the Tiger and Merlin systems. In March 2026, Tivùsat began progressively deactivating older Tiger-generation smart cards and advised affected viewers to use certified devices supplied with supported smart cards.

== Tivùsat TV channels and radio stations ==
Tivùsat offers over 130 television national and international channels, including around 70 in HD and 4K. It also features 23 regional channels (RAI TGR) and more than 40 radio stations.
