= Timeline of Discovery in the UK =

This is a timeline of Discovery, a network of television channels owned by Discovery Inc. that broadcast in the United Kingdom.

== 1980s and 1990s ==
- 1989
  - 1 April – Discovery Channel Europe launches. UK viewers could only receive the channel from Intelsat satellites at 27.5° West and via cable systems.
- 1990
  - No events.
- 1991
  - No events.
- 1992
  - 9 March – The Learning Channel launches as a daytime service, timesharing with the Discovery Channel. As with Discovery, it is only available in the UK via Intelsat and on cable.
- 1993
  - 22 July – Discovery, but not The Learning Channel, starts broadcasting on the Astra satellite.
  - 1 September – Discovery becomes a pay channel when it joins the newly formed Sky Multichannels package. It broadcasts on the platform for eight hours each day, timesharing transponder space with CMT Europe.
- 1994
  - September – The Learning Channel is renamed to TLC.
  - 3 October – TLC launches on Astra and timeshares with Discovery, broadcasting daily from 9am until 4pm.
- 1995
  - No events.
- 1996
  - 2 November – Discovery extends its broadcast hours by two hours and is now on air between 4pm and 2am.
- 1997
  - 3 April – TLC is relaunched as Discovery Home & Leisure.
- 1998
  - 1 September – Animal Planet launches on Astra satellite and analogue cable.
  - 1 October – The launch of Sky Digital sees the launch of new channels from Discovery – Discovery Civilisation, Discovery Sci-Trek, Discovery Travel & Adventure and Discovery Channel +1. Discovery Channel and Discovery Home & Leisure expand their broadcast hours to coincide with the launch, now being on air for 18 hours a day.
- 1999
  - No events.

== 2000s ==
- 2000
  - 1 February – Discovery Wings and Discovery Kids launch. They are created for the OnDigital platform. Discovery Kids broadcasts during the day with Wings taking over for the evening and are initially exclusive to OnDigital.
  - 1 July – Discovery Health launches.
- 2001
  - May – Animal Planet +1 and Discovery Home & Leisure +1 launch.
  - 18 November – Discovery Wings and Discovery Kids are replaced on ITV Digital by the Discovery Channel. Kids and Wings continue as full time channels on other platforms.
  - The closure of Sky's analogue service sees Discovery ending its part-time analogue transmissions.
- 2002
  - No events.
- 2003
  - April – Discovery Science replaces Discovery Sci-Trek.
- 2004
  - No events.
- 2005
  - February – Discovery Travel & Living replaces Discovery Travel & Adventure.
  - 7 May –
    - Discovery Home & Health and Discovery Real Time replace Discovery Health and Discovery Home & Leisure respectively, the former expanding into a female-orientated lifestyle channel.
    - Discovery Home & Health +1 launches.
  - 22 August – Discovery Real Time Extra launches.
- 2006
  - 22 May – Discovery HD launches.
- 2007
  - 1 March – Discovery Turbo replaces Discovery Wings and Discovery Kids.
  - 25 June – Discovery Channel +1.5 launches.
  - November – Discovery Knowledge replaces Discovery Civilisation and the schedule expands to also cover programming on engineering, crime and technology.
- 2008
  - 8 January – DMAX and DMAX +1 launches.
  - 21 April –
    - DMAX +2 launches.
    - Discovery Science +1 replaces Discovery Channel +1.5.
  - June – Discovery Knowledge +1 launches.
  - August – DMAX +1.5 launches.
  - November – Discovery Travel & Living +1 launches.
- 2009
  - January – Investigation Discovery launches, replacing Discovery Travel & Living +1.
  - 20 March – Discovery Shed replaces Discovery Real Time Extra.
  - 30 September – QUEST launches. It is the first non-Discovery branded channel to launch in the UK and is established as a free-to-air showcase of programming from across the Discovery channel portfolio.
  - November –
    - DMAX +1.5 closes.
    - QUEST +1 launch.

== 2010s ==
- 2010
  - 15 October – QUEST begins broadcasting a 24-hour schedule on all platforms except Freeview.
  - 7 November – Discovery History and Discovery History +1 replace Discovery Knowledge and Discovery Knowledge +1.
- 2011
  - 30 June – QUEST begins broadcasting a 24-hour schedule on Freeview after Gems TV, with whom QUEST had shared apace, acquired a 24-hour Freeview stream.
- 2012
  - No events.
- 2013
  - 30 April – TLC, TLC +1 and Investigation Discovery +1 launch, replacing Discovery Real Time, Discovery Real Time +1 and Discovery Travel & Living.
- 2014
  - 6 March – Quest +1 launches on Freeview.
  - 21 July – Quest broadcasts sport for the first time when it shows live football in the form of the 2014 Schalke 04 Cup - a pre-season tournament.
- 2015
  - No events.
- 2016
  - No events.
- 2017
  - 15 March – Quest Red launches.
- 2018
  - March – Following Discovery, Inc.'s purchase of Scripps Networks Interactive, Discovery adds three lifestyle channels to its portfolio - Food Network, HGTV and Travel Channel. The acquisition also sees Discovery taking a 50% stake in UKTV.
- 2019
  - 16 January – DMAX becomes a free-to-air channel and launches on Freeview and Freesat.
  - 1 April – Discovery Inc. announces that it will acquire BBC Studios' stakes in Good Food, Home and Really, while BBC Studios will acquire Discovery's stakes in the seven remaining UKTV networks for £173 million.
  - 11 June – Discovery Inc. takes full control of the ex-UKTV channels, Good Food, Home and Really.
  - 12 September – Food Network merges Good Food.

== 2020s ==
- 2020
  - 21 January – HGTV replaces Home.
  - 27 August – Travel Channel closes.
- 2021
  - 6 January – Discovery Shed and Discovery Home & Health close.
- 2022
  - No events.
- 2023
  - No events.
- 2024
  - 1 July - All Discovery Channels are delisted from Sky SD and Freesat SD as they continues on Sky HD and Freesat HD.
