= Discovery (Italian TV channel) =

- Country: Italy
- Broadcast area: Italy, reaching bordering regions via overspill of the Italian terrestrial network

Programming
- Languages: Italian, Original
- Picture format: 1080i HDTV

Ownership
- Owner: Warner Bros. Discovery EMEA
- Sister channels: Nove; Discovery Turbo; DMAX; Food Network; Frisbee; Giallo; HGTV; K2; Real Time

History
- Launched: 1 September 1997; 29 years ago
- Replaced: Warner TV (Italian version)
- Closed: 1 July 2025; 16 months ago (+1 timeshift version)

Links
- Website: www.discoverychannel.it

Availability

Terrestrial
- Digital terrestrial television: Channel 37
- Tivùsat: Channel 37

Streaming media
- Discovery+: Discovery Channel HD

Discovery is an Italian television channel, owned by Warner Bros. Discovery Italia.

== History ==
Discovery Channel was launched on 1 September 1997 on the pay-television platforms TELE+ Digitale and Stream TV and has been exclusive to Sky Italia since its launch in 2003. With the launch of Sky Italia, Discovery quickly branched out by launching the additional channels Discovery Travel & Adventure, Discovery Science and Discovery Civilisation Channel, followed by Animal Planet and Discovery Real Time in 2005.

The present Discovery Channel logo was adopted on 9 April 2019.

A timeshifted version of the channel, called Discovery Channel +1, started on 10 November 2008.

A high-definition simulcast of the Discovery Channel started on 20 July 2009. It was the first channel from Discovery EMEA to be simulcast in both SD and HD.

The sisters channels Discovery World, Discovery Travel & Living and Animal Planet respectively closed on 1 March 2016 (Discovery World; 11 August 2008, as Discovery Civilisation Channel) and 1 February 2019 (Discovery T&L and Animal Planet).

From 1 July 2021, the channel moved to channel 405 on Sky.

From 1 November 2023, the channel moved to channel 407 on Sky.

From 1 November 2023, the timeshift +1 version of the channel moved to channel 408.

Discovery Channel closed on Sky on 1 July 2025, due to Warner Bros. Discovery declining to renew its contract with Sky Italia, causing the permanent shutdown of its timeshift variant. As a result, the channel became exclusive to the Italian version of Discovery+, but it was announced that the channel would become available on free-to-air terrestrial television sometime during the fall.

It was later announced that Discovery Channel would replace the Italian version of Warner TV on free-to-air Italian terrestrial television on 5 October 2025, on channel 37, and started broadcasting at 6:00 AM with the program Matto da pescare
