= Top Up TV =

Former UK pay TV service

- Type: Limited company
- Industry: Pay TV
- Predecessor: ITV Digital
- Founded: March 2004
- Defunct: June 2015
- Key people: David Chance, Nick Markham
- Products: Pay TV services programming

Top Up TV was a pay TV service in the United Kingdom that was launched in March 2004, operating on the digital terrestrial television platform. The service aimed to "top up" Freeview customers by providing additional content and services through encrypted TV channels unavailable to other viewers.

The service offered a variety of content from various providers through 'TV Favourites', and old and low-budget movies from NBCUniversal through PictureBox Movies, all of which could be viewed on demand. Top Up TV formerly offered live premium sports channels including ESPN, Sky Sports 1 and Sky Sports 2. The service could be received by equipment having a built-in card slot: a DVB-T set-top box, a recorder or an integrated television receiver. As of July 2013, there were approximately 200,000 subscribers.

In late 2013, Top Up TV ceased broadcasting and sold its subscriber business to Sky.

== History ==
The company was founded by two former BSkyB executives, David Chance and Ian West. The management team consisted of Chance as chairman and Nick Markham as chief executive officer. Top Up TV was 20% owned by Channel 5 and restructured during 2006, with the original company liquidated under Members Voluntary Liquidation under the name Minds1. The owner of Access Industries, Len Blavatnik, is said to have purchased a 70% stake in January 2007.

According to the Registre de Commerce et des Sociétés of the Grand Duchy of Luxembourg, the accounts lodged by Top Up TV Europe S.a.r.l. in 2010 indicated costs of €38 million, debts of €23 million and ongoing losses of €21 million.

=== 2004–06: Launch and early years ===
Top Up TV, as Newincco 166 Ltd, bid for the multiplex D licence on the DTT service in 2002 in a joint application with Carlton, Granada and Channel 4, trading as the Digital Terrestrial Alliance (DTA). The company were prepared to offer a "viable" and "lite-pay" service, which would have provided a large number of free-to-air channels and a few pay-TV ones. The bid was unsuccessful, and the licence was instead awarded to the BBC, BSkyB and Crown Castle, which later became National Grid Wireless.

After unsuccessful multiplex bid, Top Up TV turned to public service broadcasters Channel 5 and Channel 4 to gain capacity on the platform. On multiplex A, Top Up TV were granted four long-term streams (one of which previously hosted TV Travel Shop), and on multiplex 2, were granted one short-term stream from Channel 4. They came up with a time-shared system which allowed 10 pay-TV channels to be broadcast in the space of five television streams, two of which were allotted "empty" space, which later became ABC1 and Teachers' TV. The sixth stream was used as a temporary measure (as of the short-term contract with Channel 4), and hosted pay-per-view channels Xtraview and Red Hot.

Top Up TV focused less on the premium services which had been prominent on ITV Digital prior to 2002. By 2005, eleven channels were available on the service but were all timeshared. Overnight this dropped to as few as two channels (from the main package), in order to make space for premium adult entertainment channels.

From its launch in 2004, a promotional video presented by Alice Beer ran on the channel placeholders and the Top Up TV Sampler channel. From March 2004, Top Up TV provided a package of 10 timeshared TV channels which was joined by an eleventh in 2005: UKTV Gold, UKTV Style, UKTV Food, Discovery Channel, Discovery Home & Leisure, TCM, E4, Bloomberg, Cartoon Network and Boomerang. On 27 May 2005, E4 left Top Up TV to become a free-to-air channel and was replaced by British Eurosport which began broadcasting on the platform on 1 June 2005. Toonami also joined the line-up. Discovery Home & Leisure was rebranded Discovery Real Time. In its first year of operation, the company made losses of £7 million. The original service broke even at 250,000 subscribers (according to some sources) around the Time Top Up TV Anytime was announced. This figure fell significantly short of the claimed potential subscriber numbers of 650,000 as set out in the original Freeview Plus proposal document, due to the differing market in 2004 and increasing competition from Sky (who had acquired ITV Digital's customer details) and cable TV companies.

Top Up TV provided additional services such as Xtraview which offered Top Up TV channels on a per-day basis, but closed down after Channel 4 wanted the stream back for its own use. This was replaced for a time by Top Up TV Pay As You Go. Top Up TV Active was an interactive advertising service that replaced the off-air MHEG screens on channel 107; it also featured an audio version of QuizWorld.

In August 2005, Setanta Sports broadcast live pay-per-view Scottish Premier League matches in conjunction with Top Up TV, using Top Up TV's Xtraview technology. Originally this was only available to viewers in Scotland, but was made available nationwide in early 2006.

By 9 February 2007, all but two live channels on the service had been replaced with the push video-on-demand service, as the original package was slowly phased out. However, premium sports could still be accessed on a live basis. The Xtraview access control system was still in use for TelevisionX.

=== 2006–13: On-demand and premium sports ===
On 30 August 2006, Top Up TV announced that it was to launch a new service known as Top Up TV Anytime. The new service required a Top Up TV Anytime DTR, effectively a digital terrestrial television recorder, which allowed access to on-demand and encrypted channels. The original service, following Anytime's launch, was later mostly phased out, being reduced to two live non-sport channels, Gold and Home. Existing channels of the original service at launch closed down or had their hours reduced before being phased out completely. These channels, along with new channels such as Living and Disney Channel, joined the new service and began offering content on an on-demand basis. PictureBox Movies launched as a premium movies add-on in October 2006.

Also in 2006, Inview Technology launched the world's first push-VOD service for Top Up TV.

On 11 February 2007, Top Up TV's per-per-view Scottish Premier League matches were discontinued, and the Setanta Sports channel was made available on Top Up TV by a separate subscription. The Setanta Sports channel ceased broadcasting in June 2009 after the company went bust.

In 2009, Top Up TV Anytime was rebranded into TV Favourites, spawning PictureBox and the newly launched ESPN into viewing packs available as part of TV Favourites or available separately. Monday 2 August 2010 saw Sky Sports 1 and Sky Sports 2 launch through Top Up TV.

Originally, four streams were used to distribute the TV Favourites service, but the fourth stream was taken off air on 11 January 2010. The third stream was pulled from air roughly ten months later. The first stream under the name of "Top Up TV Anytime 1" in the EPG timeshared with ESPN, and the second stream under the name of "Top Up TV Anytime 3" in the EPG timeshared with Home, Gold, and Television X.

=== 2013: Loss of sports and closure ===
In June 2013, following the acquisition of ESPN by BT Sport and the announcement of the removal of Sky Sports 1 & 2 from the Digital Terrestrial Television (DTT) network by BT, Top Up TV began sending letters to their customers stating that their premium sports package(s) would be discontinued. Sky Sports 1 & 2 were removed on 1 July, and ESPN on 1 August.

In September, Top Up TV sent customers on the TV Favourites and PictureBox packages letters informing them that the service would cease broadcasting on 31 October 2013 and that all remaining subscriptions will cease automatically. TUTV advised that the hardware will continue to work as a Freeview decoder. This brought the period of uncertainty about TUTV's future to an end.

On 31 October, Top Up TV placed a notice on their website stating that they had ceased broadcasting. The company sold their subscriber business to Sky where new subscribers to Sky could get up to 50% off for a year if they went through Top Up TV. Until June 2015, the company continued to run conditional access to the Freeview platform which BT used to broadcast BT Sport 1 and 2.

== Services ==
=== TV Favourites ===
Launched in December 2006 as Top Up TV Anytime, the service offered video on demand content from many channels. In 2009, Top Up TV Anytime was rebranded as TV Favourites, as Top Up TV no longer needed the Anytime brand to differentiate its on-demand service from its previous linear service. The service was only accessible through a Top Up TV DVB-T DVR set top box. Content was available by pressing the Top Up TV button on the remote whilst watching a TV channel or perusing the EPG. Over time, channels like Living and Home were phased out, replaced by programmes from the BBC, Warner Bros. Television and The Walt Disney Company. The channel icons displayed on the Top Up TV EPG changed from being the logo of their respective channel in favour of a uniform genre list.

Providers that were available at the time were:

Comedy/Drama

- Gold
- United States drama from ABC

Factual

- Crime & Investigation Network
- History
- Home

=== PictureBox ===
PictureBox was a movies service in which around 28 old and low-budget movies were downloaded to the subscriber's Top Up TV Freeview+ box every night for a monthly fee. Movies offered were from the NBCUniversal library. Seven films were available at any one time, with titles being refreshed nightly. The service launched in October 2006 and was the first premium add-on available to Top Up TV customers. Top Up TV was the first platform in the world to host the service along with its TV programmes spin-off, TV Box.

=== Discontinued channels and services ===
Entertainment, factual and comedy

- Animal Planet – On-demand content
- MTV – On-demand content
- Paramount Comedy – On-demand content
- Syfy – On-demand content
- Life and Times – On-demand content
- Hallmark Channel – On-demand content
- Living – On-demand content
- Discovery Channel – Original channel and on-demand content
- Discovery Real Time – Original channel and on-demand content
- BBC Programmes – On-demand content
- CBS – On-demand content
- Warner TV – On-demand content
- TV Box (NBCUniversal)
- National Geographic Channel (UK)

News and sport

- Bloomberg Television – Original live channel and on-demand content
- British Eurosport – Original live channel and on-demand content
- Sports Xtra – On-demand content
- Setanta Sports 1 – Premium sport channel, closed due to administration and subsequently closed down

Film

- Turner Classic Movies (TCM) – Original live channel and on-demand content

Kids

- Toonami – Original live channel and on-demand content
- Boomerang – Original live channel and on-demand content
- Cartoon Network – Original live channel and on-demand content
- Cartoon Network Too
- Nickelodeon
- Disney Channel

=== ESPN ===
ESPN was a premium sport channel offering Premier League football, among other sports, for a monthly fee. The channel could be accessed through a conditional-access module (CAM), set top box with a slot, an IDTV with a slot or through a Top Up TV Freeview+ box. It replaced Setanta Sports 1 when its parent company went into administration and was closed. Because this channel time-shared with the downloads for the TV Favourites service, it was barred from broadcasting 24 hours a day. Between Setanta Sports 1 closing and ESPN launching, ESPN America filled airtime whilst carriage negotiations were ongoing. The channel is still offered by BT TV under their BT Sport package.

=== Sky Sports ===
Sky Sports 1 and 2 were also offered as of 2 August 2010 as Ofcom's pay-TV review saw the channels being offered under a wholesale must offer (WMO) agreement which effectively forces BSkyB to offer these channels to its competitors. Using capacity which BT secured and used to offer the same channels to its BT Vision subscribers, Top Up TV also offered these two channels to its subscribers which officially launched on 2 August 2010. Top Up TV had been able to offer Sky Sports 1 & 2, and ESPN via a conditional-access module from October 2011. This was possible only via CI+ compatible IDTVs and set-top boxes.

== Equipment ==
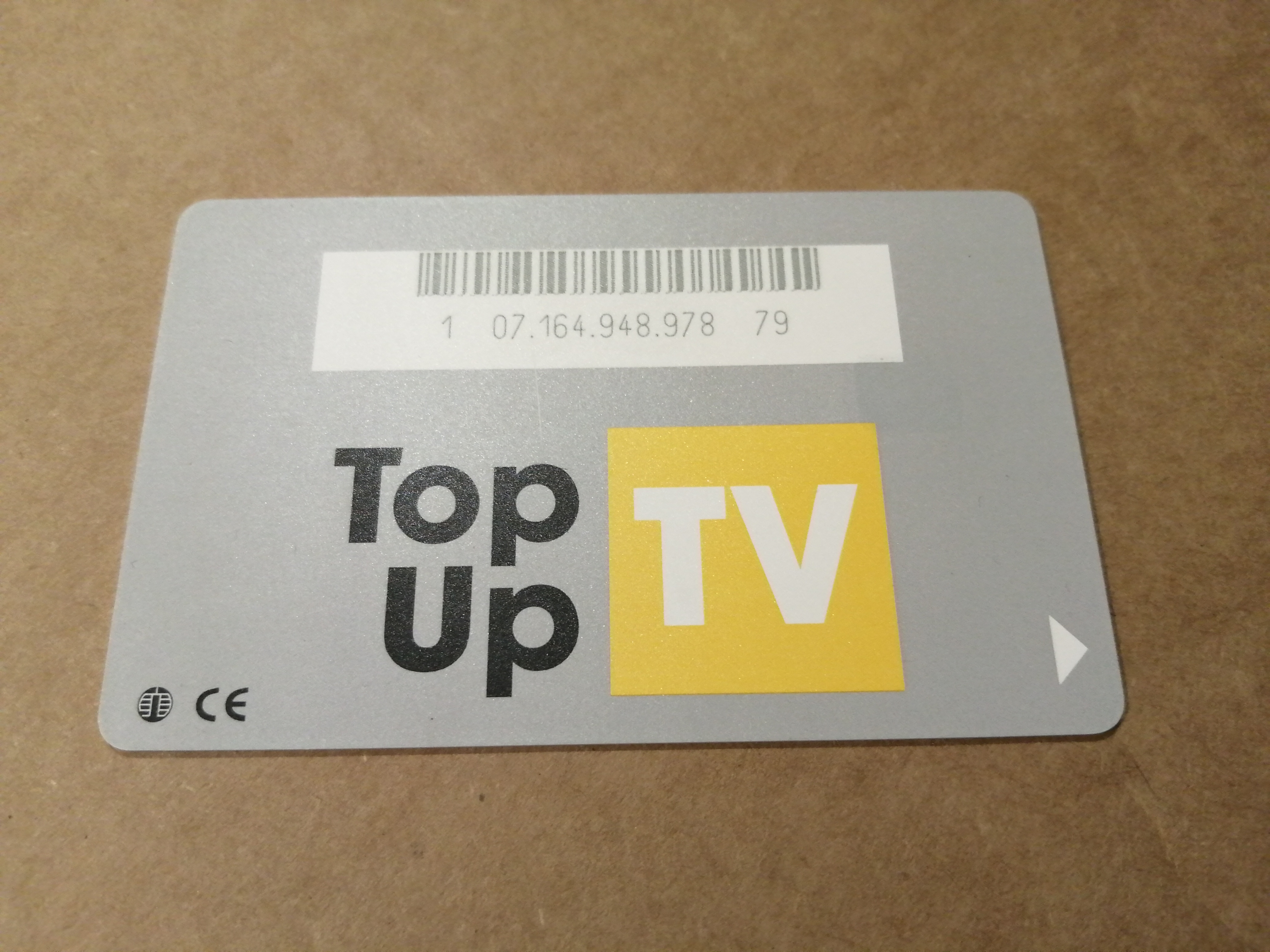
A Top Up TV viewing card

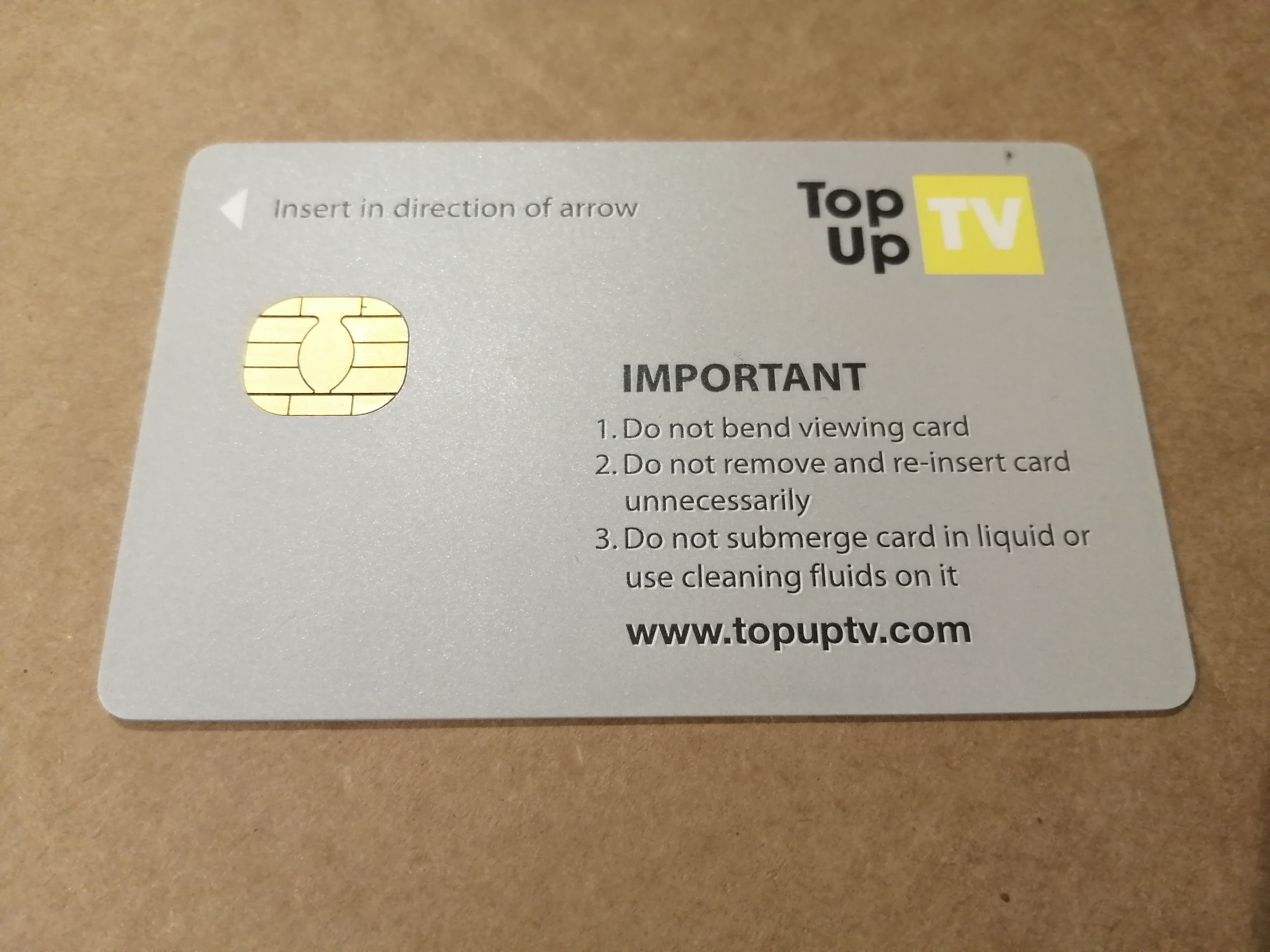

Top Up TV offered its services over a range of devices. The Top Up TV Freeview+ DTRs offered all services from Top Up TV. All Top Up TV set-top boxes and CAMs allowed access to ESPN whilst the CI+ CAM and approved set-top boxes allowed viewers to subscribe to Sky Sports and ESPN. A viewing smartcard (viewing card) is used to unlock customers' services. Top Up TV used the Nagravision Merlin (NagraVision 3) encryption since a card swap in 2008. Previously programmes were encrypted by MediaGuard SECA2, a more secure version of the encryption system of previous digital terrestrial incumbent ITV Digital. All Top Up TV set top boxes and DTRs were required to have at least an 8-day EPG, similar to the requirement for normal Freeview boxes.

=== Top Up TV Freeview+ box (DTR) ===
A range of Top Up TV Freeview+ digital TV recorders, also known as DTRs, automatically records programmes broadcast overnight, which the user can then watch on-demand. The first generation box was manufactured by Thomson – Thomson DTI 6300-16 containing a 160GB HDD. Higher capacity boxes were introduced later on with the Thomson DTI 6300–25, effectively the Thomson DTI 6300-16 with a 250GB HDD. Different manufacturer's equipment such as Luxor, Bush, Sharp, Wharfdale and a new Thomson box were available from retailers such as Argos and ASDA. These newer boxes contain varying degrees of capacity ranging from 160GB to 500GB.

Included in the packaging was a Top Up TV bespoke remote control and SCART lead, a signal improvement kit, an RF lead and a power cable. Printed materials include the Top Up TV welcome pack, a remote control codes guide and an instruction manual. The rear of the box had two SCART sockets, two tuners, an S-Video output, analogue phono output and Digital Audio output. It featured a powered but functionless USB port on the front or rear of the DTR.

=== Set-top box (STB) ===
Initially, Top Up TV made use of set-top boxes with viewing card slots to offer a linear pay TV service. At launch, only ex-ITV Digital boxes were available, but new boxes were soon produced, bearing the "Top Up TV Ready" logo. Since the unavoidable move towards on demand, the live channel hours were reduced and eventually closed.

All previous "Top Up TV Ready" set-top boxes with viewing card slots were later only able to receive ESPN. With the launch of Sky Sports in 2010, BSkyB insisted that the viewing smart card must be paired to the set-top box. Whilst Top Up TV Freeview+ DTR's have this facility using the CAN number, few other set-top boxes offered this facility and had to be approved by Top Up TV. These approved boxes included the i-CAN Freeview HD Box, the Top Up TV T215 and Sagem IDT68 and IDT72.

=== Conditional-access module (CAM) ===
A conditional-access module can be inserted into a CI slot mostly found on modern IDTVs to enable decryption of encrypted services. Whilst Top Up TV offered a branded CAM, only ESPN could be received. This is due to BSkyB having concerns with the security of these modules meaning Sky Sports 1 and Sky Sports 2 are not available.

CI+ CAMs were due to become available to overcome such security concerns, offering access to Sky Sports and ESPN from August 2011, but there were delays to the launch due to Top Up TV having difficulties trying to identify compatible devices. These devices finally appeared in October 2011.
