= Xtraview =

British pay-per-view television channel

Ownership
- Owner: Top Up TV

History
- Launched: February 2005
- Closed: August 31, 2005
- Former names: Top Up TV Sampler

Links
- Website: www.xtraview.co.uk (no longer active)

Availability At time of closure

Terrestrial
- Digital Terrestrial: Channel 36 (now taken by 5*)

Xtraview was a British pay-per-view television channel run by Top Up TV. It replaced Top Up TV Sampler, a promotional channel showing Top Up TV's latest offers presented by Alice Beer. Xtraview showed a selection of programs from the Top Up TV package, at a cost of one pound per day. It ceased broadcasting on 31 August 2005 at 11.00pm due to lack of space on the DTT platform after Top Up TV's short-term lease with Channel 4 on multiplex 2 expired in September 2005, and has since been replaced with More 4. The official reason stated on the channel is that it is being "modified", however no developments were made and this screen was shown from its demise to March 2006.

The channel used the Xtraview Encryption System, making the channel vulnerable to hacking. Another downfall was that if the digital terrestrial receiver was switched off, the box lost access to the channel.

For a short time Top Up TV Pay As You Go offered a replacement for Xtraview. However, Top Up TV Pay as You Go also closed on 31 May 2006.

== Xtraview daily schedule ==
Monday to Friday

06:00-09:00 Boomerang
09:00-12:00 Discovery Real Time
12:00-14:00 Cartoon Network
14:00-16:00 UKTV Food
16:00-18:00 Cartoon Network
18:00-19:00 UKTV Style
19:00-21:00 UKTV Gold
21:00-23:00 Discovery Channel

Saturday-Sunday

06:00-09:00 Boomerang
09:00-12:00 Discovery Real Time
12:00-18:00 Cartoon Network
18:00-19:00 UKTV Style
19:00-21:00 Turner Classic Movies
21:00-23:00 Discovery Channel

== Video "encryption" system ==
The video encryption system used on Xtraview was not true encryption. Rather, Xtraview hid an additional video feed within the stream from the provider. The set top box was directed to display the hidden feed when the owner paid for the content. This led to problems with some users hacking the boxes to display the hidden feed.
