= Animal Planet (Italy) =

Italian television channel

- Network: Discovery EMEA

Ownership
- Owner: Discovery, Inc.
- Sister channels: Discovery Channel; Discovery Science; Discovery Travel & Living; Discovery Real Time

History
- Launched: 1 May 2005; 21 years ago
- Closed: 1 February 2019; 7 years ago

Links
- Website: animalplanet.it

Animal Planet was an Italian television channel broadcasting programmes about animals. All content is adapted for an Italian audience. The channel closed down 1 February 2019.

== History ==
The channel launched on 1 May 2005, exclusively available on Sky Italia. It was the fifth channel launched by Discovery Networks in Italy after Discovery Channel, Discovery Science, Discovery Civilisation and Discovery Travel & Adventure.

In October 2008, the channel adopted a new logo and a new look, previously adopted by the channel's American counterpart.

Animal Planet closed along with Discovery Travel & Living in Italy on 1 February 2019.

In April 2019, its content became available on Dplay and adopted the US version.
