= Discovery Home =

Discovery Home can mean:

- Discovery Home or Discovery Home & Leisure, a U.S digital cable channel founded in 1998 and renamed as Planet Green; currently Destination America
- Discovery Home & Health, a worldwide television channel formally known as Discovery Health
- Discovery Real Time, a British television channel replaced by TLC, formally known as Discovery Home or Discovery Home & Leisure
