= Discovery Home & Health (British and Irish TV channel) =

British and Irish television satellite and cable channel

Programming
- Picture format: 576i 16:9 SDTV
- Timeshift service: Discovery Home & Health +1

Ownership
- Owner: Discovery, Inc.
- Sister channels: Animal Planet; Discovery Channel; Discovery History; Discovery Science; Discovery Shed; Discovery Turbo; DMAX; Food Network; HGTV; Investigation Discovery; Quest; Quest Red; Really; TLC

History
- Launched: 1 July 2000; 26 years ago
- Closed: 6 January 2021; 5 years ago
- Replaced by: Content shifted to Discovery+
- Former names: Discovery Health (2000–2005)

Former logo used from 2007 to 2013

Discovery Home & Health was a British and Irish television satellite and cable channel. It was launched on 1 July 2000 as part of the Discovery Channel's bouquet of channels, as Discovery Health, following a similar format to the American channel of the same name.

It was rebranded on 7 May 2005 to its current name, and relaunched as a female oriented lifestyle channel. This coincided with the relaunch of Discovery Home & Leisure as Discovery Real Time, a male oriented channel. In the same month, a timeshift service - Discovery Home & Health +1, began test operations on Sky and fully launched on the 23rd.

On 30 April 2013, Discovery Home & Health received a new look, following the closure of Discovery Real Time and Discovery Travel & Living, and began broadcasting in widescreen, the last of Discovery's UK channels to do so. Some programming from the closed channels was transferred over to Home & Health. At the same time the channels also moved into Real Time's old EPG slots on Sky and did so on Virgin Media on 7 May 2013.

The network was superseded by the streaming platform Discovery+, which effectively carries all of its content, and it was discontinued with immediate effect on 6 January 2021, the same fate which befell Discovery Shed.
