= Thomson DTI 6300-16 =

Thomson DTI6300
- Media type: Mechanical hard drive based digital video recorder (marketed as a DTR)
- Capacity: 160GB/250GB HDD
- Dimensions: WxHxD - 368x62x221mm
- Weight: 1.8kg
- Usage: Access to Top Up TV programme library, receiving Freeview channels

The Thomson DTI 6300-16 (or 6300-25 to denote the 250GB version) was the first digital television recorder used to access Top Up TV’s push video on-demand service. The device first launched on the market in 2006. Previously the Top Up TV Freeview+ box was known as the Top Up TV+ BOX and the Top Up TV Anytime DTR. connections to the TV and external equipment are made at the rear of the box whilst at the front is the remote sensor, coloured LEDs, viewing card slot and front panel controls.

== Packaging ==
Included in the packaging is a Top Up TV remote control and SCART lead, a signal improvement kit, an RF lead and a power cable. Printed materials include the Top Up TV welcome pack, a remote control codes guide and an instruction manual. The rear of the box has two SCART sockets, two TV tuners, an S-Video output, analogue phono output and digital audio output. It features a powered but functionless USB port on the front or rear of the DTR.

== Firmware ==
The system software is developed by Top Up TV by Kieron Edwards and the other members of the Technical team at Top Up TV. The overnight downloads and existing pay TV "live" channels like ESPN and Gold use the Nagravision Merlin encryption system (in chameleon mode) after a card swap in 2008. For interactive services the box has a fast MHEG5 v1.06 engine. It is also capable of receiving MHEG Plus applications such as Betfair and Teletext Extra as of version 4.07 also both services are no longer available support in the software code remains. Whilst the box contains a 160GB HDD or a 250GB HDD in the DTI 6300-25 version, the box can be upgraded support up to 500GB HDD's.

Top Up TV Freeview+ Box has received thirteen software revisions since its launch, these are for the Thomson DTI6300-16 (160GB) and DTI6300-25 (250GB) models:

Version	Released	Notes
1.50		Shipped firmware.
1.80		First firmware update.
2.00	08/01/2007	Second firmware update.
2.44	12/03/2007	Third firmware update. Fixed problems with the box crashing, rebooting, and missing or deleting recordings. Also added series link, which allows the whole series of a show to be downloaded automatically.
2.81	03/07/2007	Fourth firmware update. Improved general stability and encryption. Also added Subtitles, which although there was a dedicated button on the remote it was functionless. Also fixed the problem with BBCi News Multi-screen.
2.88	08/11/2007	Fifth firmware update. This software includes a number of enhancements and improvements. Specifically EPG & VOD Search (You need to turn this on by going MENU -> 4, 2 and then selecting on from line 5), expanded the Synopsis window, Removed the Anytime Grey Channel bars in the EPG, Revised “Favourites” screen, Series link reliability is now improved and failed series link recordings are rescheduled, Inclusion of a Channel and VOD Channel Lock facility screen, added facility to “centre” the display off-set. The reliability of VOD downloads has been improved. The ability to save content from the VOD library to the user library has been re-activated. A number of other user interface changes that will make the DTR easier to operate and improved the stability of the DTR generally. It still retains a major bug from previous versions in that the rewind and fast forward functions are not reliable, as the box apparently "forgets" where it is and is liable to skip backward an hour or more if users fast-forward a show after rewinding once.
2.91	31/03/2008	Sixth firmware update. Addresses channel scanning issues for viewers in the Sutton Coldfield transmitter area, allegedly fixes some stability issues, and adds a troubleshooting option to the engineer menu to turn off the recording library's video preview window. It still retains a major bug from previous versions in that the rewind and fast forward functions are not reliable, as the box apparently "forgets" where it is and is liable to skip back wards an hour or more if users fast-forward a show after rewinding once. It also fast-forwards instead of rewinding on occasions.
2.93	29/07/2008	Seventh firmware update to address the channel scanning problem (NIT issue) for repeater transmitters. It was released as an opt in (via forcing a download) a few days before it was officially released on 01/08/08
2.99	17/09/2008	eighth firmware update, to address issues such as the box locking up which were introduced since the last few software updates.
3.31	13/11/2008	Ninth update, pulled the next day because of major bugs such as causing paid for services - mainly Setanta Sports 1 – to stop working. The box was reverted to 2.99 the next day. The update added MHEG 1.06 and Freeview+ Functionality which will now be made available in a later update.
3.59	24/03/2009	Tenth update, this update improved the general reliability such as correcting the FF/RW bug and freezing. There was also improvements made to the MHEG engine, menu options and colour scheme. This version has introduced new bugs such as Scart switching and aspect ratio problems. The "Favourites" feature was removed because of patent issues, this could potentially be restored in a future release.
4.07	21/06/2009	An update to allow for application support to the PVR. This has meant Teletext Extra and BetFair being available for the first time. The Teletext Extra TV guide is not included as the 14-day Extended guide format uses the same guide data as Teletext Extra.
4.09	18/08/2009	Removal of Setanta lock option, fix to stop Betfair certificate taking the age rating of neighbouring VOD content as well as a fix to the start up routine to reduce ALOD occurrences.
5.08	09/12/2009	Program Library updated. You can now search for shows using A-Z, by you Own Recordings or by the type/genre of show. However, A-Z is the controversial default setting for the program Library, pressing the right arrow will return to a chronological order but there is no way to set this as default. The info box that appears when you change channel is now taller. It is not currently known if other fixes were included.
5.11	Unreleased	The build was subject to beta testing but never released superseded by 5.12 .
5.12		This build is currently in the testing phase.
6.01	13/12/2010	Stability Improvements.
7.09	13/12/2011	Stability Improvements.

There are newer models of the Top Up TV Freeview+ box manufactured by Thomson and Vestel (Wharfedale, Digihome, Bush, Sharp, Metronic etc.) which have different firmware versions to the above.

== Problems ==
The Box in its early life had numerous problems which have mostly been fixed by over the air updates. The most notable bug was the Fast Forward and Rewind bug fixed in version 3.59 which caused the box to forget its position in a recording and jump back to the beginning. The box is prone to freezing in standby for no apparent reason but control can be restored by power cycling the box. There is also a problem with the aspect ratio (AFD), where the aspect ratio does not automatically correct itself when switching from a 16:9 programme to a 4:3 programme and vice versa resulting in a stretched picture. This problem started with version 4.07 but was not addressed in the minor release 4.09. This can often be manually corrected by switching to standby and back or through the box setup menus. If not, then it can be corrected by altering the aspect ratio on the TV, rather than the box. It is widely believed that problems with the box is one of the main reasons why customers choose not to resubscribe after their first free month.

During the life of the software more bugs continue to emerge or be introduced. System hangs are not uncommon, the accepted (recommended) solution is to unplug the box from the wall, and re-power after twenty seconds. Recorded files can be "corrupt", such corruption can cause failures to the normal operation of the box. If the user changes channel on one receiver or uses Fast Forward and Rewind on one file this can cause video jumps in files that are being recorded.

Many of the problems of crashes while recording, are caused by the box running out of disk space. The free space figure shown on the library menu, is not the amount that the box really believes is on the hard drive. In order to find out the real figure that the box uses, go to Main menu->Set-up->Help. At the bottom of the page, it tells you if the disk is present and the percentage free. If the box runs out of space while recording it may crash immediately, or appear to function normally until the scheduled end of the recording and then crash. If the latter is suspected selecting 'watch from the start' on the planned recordings menu, and viewing the playback timer will indicate if it has run out of space or not. If the recording is ongoing, the playback timer will not decrease at normal playback speed. If it is decreasing it is possible to abort the recording to stop the box crashing, with the option of saving the part of the programme already recorded.

To reduce the chances of the box crashing while not viewing, leave the box on, rather than on standby, and on the main menu.

Deleting recorded programmes from the programme library while recording another programme, is also quite likely to cause the box to crash.

There has also been a problem related to the power-supply design, which contained 2 low quality capacitors (1000 microfarad; 16 volt) when first manufactured that couldn't cope with the high charge & discharge rates demanded of them and which tended to fail after about 2–3 years of use, leading to a totally dead recorder.

== Awards ==
In 2007 the Thomson DTI 6300-16 won the Computer Shopper award for best hard disk based recorder on the market.

== See also ==
- Freeview
- Top Up TV
- TiVo
