= Discovery Shed =

- Country: United Kingdom

Programming
- Picture format: 16:9 576i SDTV

Ownership
- Owner: Discovery, Inc.
- Sister channels: Animal Planet; Discovery Channel; Discovery History; Discovery Home & Health; Discovery Science; Discovery Turbo; DMAX; Food Network; HGTV; Investigation Discovery; Quest; Quest Red; Really; TLC; Travel Channel

History
- Launched: 20 March 2009; 17 years ago
- Replaced: Discovery Real Time Extra
- Closed: 6 January 2021; 5 years ago
- Replaced by: Content shifted to Discovery+

Discovery Shed (Also simply known as Shed) was a TV channel in the United Kingdom from Discovery, Inc. which replaced Discovery Real Time Extra. The channel launched on 20 March 2009. The channel featured programming covering fishing, DIY, construction, cars, bikes, and outdoor extreme adventure. The network was superseded by the streaming platform Discovery+, which effectively carries all of its content, and it was discontinued with immediate effect on 6 January 2021, the same fate which befell Discovery Home & Health.

== See also ==
- Discovery Channel
- Discovery Real Time
- Discovery Turbo
