= Alice Beer =

English television presenter and consumer journalist (born 1965)

- Born: 17 May 1965 (age 61)
- Spouse: Paul Pascoe
- Children: 2
- Presenting career
- Show: Watchdog, Holiday, The Heaven and Earth Show

Alice Beer (born 17 May 1965) is an English television presenter and consumer journalist. She is best known for appearing on the consumer investigative journalism programme Watchdog on BBC One between 1993 and 1999, and as the consumer presenter on This Morning since 2014.

== Career ==
Beer trained as a primary school teacher from 1983 to 1987 at Roehampton Institute of Higher Education. In 1987, her first job was as a secretary on the BBC programme That's Life!. She was a trainee researcher on Kilroy and Gloria Live. She became an assistant producer on the consumer programme Watchdog and, from 1992 until 1999, she was a co-presenter with Anne Robinson. After leaving Watchdog she appeared on programmes including Healthcheck, Face Value and Real Rakeovers, as well as reporting for Holiday and Summer Holiday. She has also appeared as herself on Bremner, Bird and Fortune.

She also appeared alongside Vic Reeves and Bob Mortimer on a gameshow called Families At War, which aired on BBC1 in 1998 and was a regular presenter on The Heaven and Earth Show, and during two series of Hot Property for Five. She currently presents a programme for BBC London 94.9. Between December 2004 and February 2005, she presented a promotional video for Top Up TV. The looped film ran 19 hours each day on the Top Up TV Sampler channel. The channel was replaced by Xtraview before closing altogether in September 2005.

Beer has appeared on ITV programme This Morning since 2014.

== Personal life ==
Beer and her husband Paul Pascoe live in Wiltshire, and have twin daughters, born in 2003.
