= Il castello delle cerimonie =

- Also known as: My Crazy Italian Wedding
- Presented by: Antonio Polese (s. 1–5); Imma Polese (s. 6–)
- Opening theme: ’Nu matrimonio napulitano
- Country of origin: Italy
- Original languages: Italian, Neapolitan
- No. of seasons: 12
- No. of episodes: 141

Production
- Production locations: Sant'Antonio Abate, Naples
- Running time: 25 minutes

Original release
- Network: Real Time Italy (2014–)
- Release: January 2014

Il castello delle cerimonie (previously titled Il boss delle cerimonie; known in the UK as My Crazy Italian Wedding) is a 2014 Italian weekday television series, that currently airs on TLC (originally on Real Time), originally hosted by Antonio Polese. It takes place at the Grand Hotel La Sonrisa.

Antonio Polese died on December 1, 2016, aged 80, at the Pineta Grande Clinic in Castel Volturno because of the heart failure he had suffered from since October. However, it was confirmed that some episodes for the fifth season had already been filmed, and that Real Time would broadcast such episodes during the spring of 2017. Following these episodes there would be others without Don Antonio.

Since October 6, 2017 the sixth season of the program has aired, which, following the death of Don Antonio (the Boss), changed its title into Il castello delle cerimonie ("The Castle of Ceremonies"). His place was taken by his daughter Donna Imma Polese.

== Cast ==
- Don Antonio – the star of the show, owner of the location until the 5th season.
- Donna Imma – the star of the show from the 6th season, taking her father's place.
- Matteo – director, Don Antonio's son-in-law.
- Ferdinando – maître d'hôtel.

== Seasons ==
Season	Episodes	First TV on Italy
1	6	2014
2	8	2014
3	11	2015
4	10	2016
5	9	2017
6	10	2017
7	15	2018
8	15	2019
9	8	2020
10	16	2021
11	15	2022
12	15	2023
