= Renato Ardovino =

Italian television presenter and cake designer

- Born: Paestum (SA); 29 November 1968 (age 57); Italy
- Occupations: Television presenter, Cake designer
- Years active: 2005 - present

Renato Ardovino (29 November 1968) is an Italian television presenter and cake designer.

== Biography ==
Ardovino was born in Capaccio. He collaborates with numerous cooking magazines.

=== Television ===
- from 2012 - Torte in corso con Renato, Real Time
- from 2014 - My Cake Design, Real Time
- from 2020 - Il Dolce Mondo di Renato, Food Network

=== Books ===
- Torte in corso con Renato, Milano, Rizzoli Editore, 2013. ISBN 978-88-17-06738-6
- Il Cake Design, Malvarosa Editore, 2016

== See also ==
- Real Time (Italy)
