= Tris Payne =

Television presenter

Tris Payne (born 1969) is a television presenter, best known for appearances on Wish You Were Here...? and House Doctor, as well as Real Rooms on BBC1, Hot Property on Channel 5, and This Morning on ITV.

== Career ==
Payne was born in East Claydon, Buckinghamshire and began his TV career as a presenter and journalist on Television South West and Channel TV, Jersey. He was later picked up as a roving reporter on Wish You Were Here? for ITV. His move to the live Friday evening show Find a Fortune with Carol Vorderman was followed by BBC work as the main presenter on the daily shows Real Rooms and Real Wrecks and Pet Rescue the daily series on Channel 4. He worked at Five for two series of House Doctor with Ann Maurice and The Car Show with Mariella Frostrup followed by Hot Property and UKTV Style presenting Home Wasn't Built In A Day. Payne appeared on the live ITV show This Morning as the regular travel and property presenter as well as standing in for Phillip Schofield and presenting the show with Lorraine Kelly. He appeared on the celebrity special of Fort Boyard, Blankety Blank and Loose Women and was sent to cover I'm a Celebrity Get Me Outta Here... in Australia for the live inserts on This Morning, which also involved completing several of the challenges.

Payne, an RTS winner, was a broadcast development executive for a UK independent production company and a supervising producer on UK/EMEA co-productions. He has several commissions to his name including Fighter Pilot Afghanistan (nominated for two awards), a six-part series for ITV, two one-hour films on the Spanish Civil War for The History Channel and a Revealed D-Day landings special for Channel 5. His supervising producer role across UK/EMEA co-productions includes shows such as X-Factor Australia and Cake Boss USA for Discovery. Payne has spent several years working in the Middle East and his productions in the region have covered KSA, UAE, and Qatar. He also spent time in Afghanistan for ITV.

Payne has a love of retro motorcycles such as the company Deus Ex Machina and all things mechanical, filming Boys' Toys for ITV along with Pulling Power; his love of cars and bikes had led him to writing regular columns for both the Daily Express and Esquire.

In 2019 Payne was appointed Head Of Nations And Regions for a TV and film industry Called Pact. Then in July 2020 Payne was appointed the role of Broadcast director at Peters Fraser + Dunlop literacy agency.

Most recently, Payne helped Formula One team principal Guenther Steiner publish his book “Surviving To Drive: A year inside Formula One, which became The Sunday Times’ Number one best selling book.

== Personal life ==
Payne lives in the south west with his wife and two children. He enjoys motorsports, cars and travel in his spare time. During his late teenage years and early twenties, Payne was an avid horse rider and boxer, both for pleasure and competition. Dartmoor National Park inspired Payne to write a walking series which was later commissioned by ITV and Payne is a keen hill walker having completed the National Three Peaks Challenge. Other sports included mountain biking and Jiu-Jutsu, having trained under Rodriguez Cabral at The London Fight Factory.
