= Eric Young (wrestler) =

Canadian professional wrestler (born 1979)

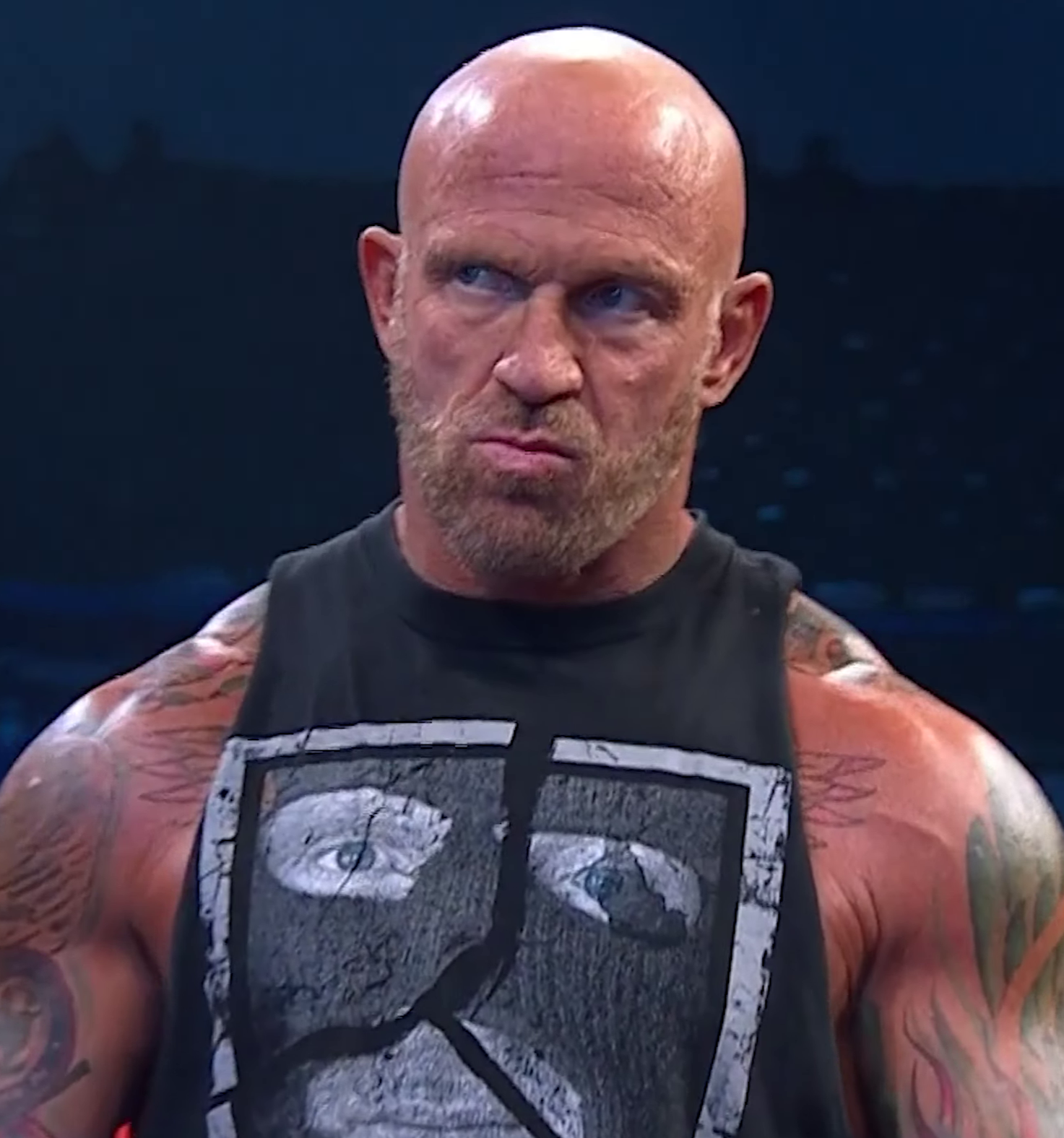
- Young in 2026

Personal information
- Born: Jeremy Fritz; December 15, 1979 (age 46) Florence, Ontario, Canada

Professional wrestling career
- Ring name(s): Eric Young; Super Eric
- Billed height: 5 ft 11 in (180 cm)
- Billed weight: 232 lb (105 kg)
- Billed from: An Undisclosed Location; Freedomland; Vancouver, British Columbia; Nashville, Tennessee (as Eric Young); Metropolis (as Super Eric); The Orient (as The Not So Great Muta)
- Trained by: Waldo Von Erich; Carl LeDuc; Scott D'Amore; Chris Kanyon
- Debut: 1998

Jeremy Fritz (born December 15, 1979), known by his ring name Eric Young, is a Canadian professional wrestler. He is signed to WWE as a producer for the NXT brand.

Fritz made his debut in Total Nonstop Action Wrestling (TNA) in 2004. During his time with the promotion he has won 14 championships, being a two-time World Champion, a one-time X Division Champion, a three-time Legends/Global/Television/King of the Mountain Champion and a seven-time World Tag Team Champion, being a two-time NWA World Tag Team Champion with Bobby Roode, and a four-time TNA/Impact World Tag Team Champion once with Kaz, once as a member of The Band with Kevin Nash and Scott Hall (under the Freebird Rule), and twice as a member of Violent By Design with Deaner and Joe Doering (again under the Freebird Rule). He also, jointly with ODB, holds the record for the longest-reigning TNA Knockouts Tag Team Championship, holding the title for 478 days despite being male.

Fritz left TNA (then called Impact Wrestling) in 2016 and signed with WWE, where he was assigned to NXT and won the NXT Tag Team Champion as a part of Sanity. He moved up to the main roster in 2019, and was released in 2020. He returned to Impact in July of that same year and between late 2020 and early 2021, formed Violent By Design (VBD), which was ultimately renamed "The Design" when Fritz left Impact for the second time in 2022. He returned to WWE in 2022 but quickly departed without appearing on television and returned to Impact for the second time in 2023, which ultimately reverted to the TNA name. He departed from TNA in 2026, and shortly after began working backstage at WWE's NXT brand.

== Early life ==
Eric Young was born Jeremy Fritz on December 15, 1979.

== Professional wrestling career ==
=== Early career (1998–2007) ===
After graduating from high school, Young began training with veteran wrestler Waldo Von Erich in Cambridge, Ontario. After training for ten weeks, he wrestled his debut match on October 14, 1998, in Benton Harbor, Michigan, facing his friend "Suicide" Sean Ball. He later received supplementary training from Scott D'Amore and Chris Kanyon. After four months, he had wrestled ten matches and was promoted to head trainer. After his training was complete, Young began working on the independent circuit. When wrestling infrequently, Young subsidised his income with a number of other jobs, including working in a pizza parlour, manufacturing brass horse harnesses, and sand casting. During his time in the Ontario independent scene, Young also owned and operated the Wrestleplex training facility out of Cambridge. Notable wrestlers to come out of the gym include Jake O'Reilly, Ontario mainstay Crazzy Steve, and World Wrestling Entertainment signee Shawn Spears.

Young appeared on WWE television three times in 2003. In August, he and future tag team partner Bobby Rude were defeated by Chuck Palumbo and Johnny Stamboli on an episode of WWE Velocity. In October, Young (announced as "Showtime" Eric Young) was defeated by Val Venis on an episode of WWE Sunday Night Heat. In November, Young lost to Sean O'Haire on WWE Velocity.

On June 30, 2007, Eric secured the APWF Light Heavyweight Championship defeating former four-time NWA World Light Heavyweight Champion "Luscious" Rocky Reynolds in Oil City, Pennsylvania.

=== Total Nonstop Action Wrestling (2004–2016) ===
==== Team Canada (2004–2006) ====
In January 2004, Young debuted in Total Nonstop Action Wrestling (TNA) as a member of Team Canada. He took part in the World X Cup event, defeating Jerry Lynn, Mr. Águila and Taichi Ishikari in a ladder match. Team Canada were a regular feature on Impact! throughout mid-2004, feuding with the 3Live Kru.

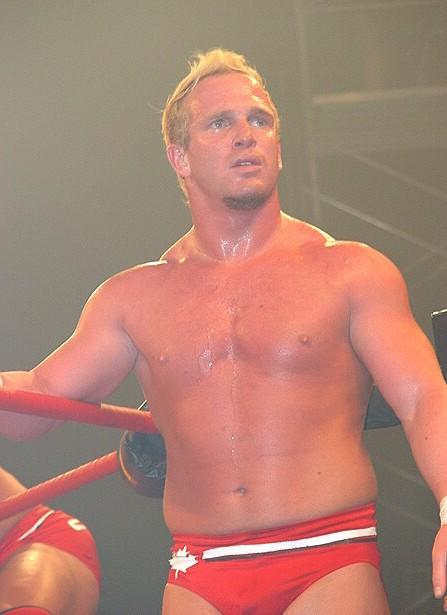
Young joined TNA as a member of Team Canada

On the October 15, 2004 episode of Impact!, Young and Bobby Roode defeated Christopher Daniels and "Cowboy" James Storm for the NWA World Tag Team Championship. They held the titles until November 7, when they were defeated by the 3Live Kru (represented by Konnan and B.G. James) at Victory Road. They regained the titles a month later at Turning Point on December 5, defeating B.G. James and Ron Killings.

Young and Roode began feuding with America's Most Wanted in early 2005, and lost the NWA World Tag Team Championship to America's Most Wanted on January 16 at Final Resolution. Young began teaming with Team Canada member Petey Williams, and on April 24, they unsuccessfully challenged America's Most Wanted for the NWA World Tag Team Championship at Lockdown. After defeating Apolo and Sonny Siaki at Hard Justice on May 15, Williams and Young challenged and lost to new NWA World Tag Team Champions The Naturals at Slammiversary on June 19.

Team Canada began feuding with The Naturals and Lance Hoyt, with Young, Roode and A-1 defeating Hoyt and The Naturals at No Surrender on July 17. America's Most Wanted formed a loose alliance with The Naturals against Team Canada, with Young, Roode, Williams and A-1 defeating The Naturals and America's Most Wanted at Sacrifice on August 14. After Williams renewed his pursuit of the X Division Championship, Young began teaming with A-1 on a regular basis. At Unbreakable on September 11, Young and A-1 faced America's Most Wanted, Alex Shelley and Johnny Candido and defending champions The Naturals in a four-way tag match. Young was able to pin both Candido and "Wildcat" Chris Harris, but Team Canada lost the match after Chase Stevens managed to pin A-1.

At Bound for Glory on October 23, Young, A-1 and Bobby Roode defeated the 3Live Kru. After the match, their attempt to attack Konnan was foiled by Kip James. Later that night, Team Canada stopped 3Live Kru from saving Rhino from an attack by Planet Jarrett, and then helped Jarrett place Rhino in a casket which they had brought to ringside. As Team Canada and Planet Jarrett celebrated together, however, Team 3D entered the ring and, with the help of the now recovered 3Live Kru, drove Planet Jarrett and Team Canada from the ring. Young, who had been standing atop the casket, was hit with a 3D by Team 3D. He was then thrown into the casket in the place of Rhino, who in turn stood atop the casket, celebrating his earlier victory for the NWA World Heavyweight Championship over Jeff Jarrett. As a result of the events of Bound For Glory, Young, Roode and A-1 faced the 3Live Kru in a rematch at Genesis on November 13. Team Canada lost the match after Ron Killings pinned Young. The long-running feud between Team Canada and the 3Live Kru ended at Turning Point on December 11 when Young, Williams, Roode and A-1 defeated the Kru and Kip James (the "4Live Kru") after Konnan turned on his teammates.

After the debut of TNA on Spike TV in October 2005, Young adopted a new character who was highly paranoid and afraid of almost anything and anybody. The character was introduced at the mock funeral staged by Planet Jarrett for Team 3D on the October 15, 2005 Impact!, when Young was startled after Abyss crushed a box of tissues that were offered to him, and then speculated that the funeral parlour was haunted by a ghost named "Katie", a tongue-in-cheek reference to the WWE "Katie Vick" storyline. The simplest things began to frighten Young, including the pyrotechnics that accompanied Team Canada's entrance. The character drew comparisons to South Park characters Tweek and Butters, and was often used for comic relief. During an interview about the World X-Cup by SoCal Val during TNA Global Impact!, Young stated "Foreigners frighten me. They're from other countries, and I don't know how to deal with that".

Two weeks after Sting and Christian Cage defeated Jeff Jarrett and Monty Brown at Final Resolution, Sting made his Impact! debut and announced his retirement. Jarrett wasted no time in pointing out that "after one match with me, Sting took his ball and went home", and most of Planet Jarrett agreed with that assessment. Young, however, became convinced that Sting was not gone, and raised the ire of Jarrett and Scott D'Amore by frequently expressing that belief. In an attempt to persuade Young that Sting had left, Jarrett commissioned Alex Shelley to obtain footage of Sting at home with his children; however, this failed to allay Young's fears. He insisted that Sting would come back and get each of them, he would even go as far as to insist that the fellow Planet Jarrett members should not call him by his nickname "Showtime" any more, due to Sting's catchphrase "It's showtime, folks!". Young lost to Sting in the main event of the April 13, 2006 Impact!. Young's paranoia did not always hinder his abilities during a match. He remained aggressive (even putting people through a table), would not hesitate to cheat, and was not afraid to capitalize on outside interference. He continued to be aided by Team Canada and Planet Jarrett.

When Jim Cornette became the new face of management in TNA and said someone would be fired, Young was afraid it would be him. He was seen on Impact! holding an up a sign in the crowd that read "Don't fire Eric Young" as the fans chanted "Don't fire Eric!" along with him. On the June 29 Impact!, Young wrestled like a classic fan favorite out of fear of being fired, and tried to prevent his fellow Canadians from doing anything underhanded. Cornette announced later that night Team Canada was now disbanded, but Young was more happy than upset because it was Earl Hebner who got fired, not Young. On the July 14 Impact!, Team Canada lost an "all or nothing" match (their only chance to stay together), keeping Team Canada disbanded.

==== Feud with Bobby Roode (2006–2007) ====
At Victory Road, Team Canada joined in the ring one last time. After running through how he felt about each member, Scott D'Amore stopped at Young. He then blamed Young for their demise and made him strip of any Team Canada items. D'Amore then said that he believed Eric Young would still be fired as he was to blame for Team Canada's end. Young then remained in the ring after the others had left and began a secret petition with the fans to keep his job. He would soon start being announced as hailing from "An Undisclosed Location". Young continued to be worried about his job/employment security, creating his own "Don't Fire Eric" T-shirts for sale.

Young's paranoia proved warranted yet again as he was fired on the October 5 Impact! after being hit with a golf club by Larry Zbyszko causing Young to lose a "Loser gets fired" match. Due to Zbyszko's interference, however, Jim Cornette gave Young a chance to get his job back by facing Zbyszko in a "Loser Gets Fired" match at Bound for Glory. Young won and got his job back, avoiding the unemployment line in the process. On the Genesis pre-show, Young scored an upset by defeating Team Canada captain Robert Roode. This infuriated Roode and on the following Impact!, Roode cut a promo against Young. The match started a six-month rivalry between the two.

Young, then dubbed the "Paranoid Pied Piper of TNA" by announcer Mike Tenay, would soon be challenged to a bikini contest by Roode's associate, Ms. Brooks. Young accepted and beat Ms. Brooks in a bikini contest at Turning Point on December 10, 2006, by wearing a SpongeBob SquarePants bikini. Young continued his feud with Robert Roode and Ms. Brooks, with Ms. Brooks trying to get Young to join "Robert Roode Inc.". Finally at Against All Odds, Ms. Brooks seduced Young into signing a contract with "Robert Roode Inc.". This consequently sent him into a shoot angle where he was systematically humiliated every week by Roode, by having to clean toilets for Roode's own personal use, and getting illegally involved in Roode's matches. Young was forced to perform these tasks because the contract Young signed gave Roode control over his TNA contract as well, so if he was fired from Roode, Inc., he was fired from TNA as well. He eventually began to fight back the orders of Roode, in part due to the advice of a mysterious "friend". On the April 26, 2007 Impact!, the "friend" was revealed as Jeff Jarrett. Young eventually sued Roode for breach of contract and subsequently defeated Roode at Slammiversary via an inside cradle, after Gail Kim took out Ms. Brooks. At Victory Road, Young and Kim would defeat Roode and Ms. Brooks in a mixed tag team match. Around this time, Young would be billed as from "Freedomland, USA", a reference to Young being free from his contract with Roode.

On the August 2, 2007 Impact!, Roode had Young tarred and feathered on national television in the Impact Zone. On August 8, on TNA Today, Young commented on the humiliation he felt when he was tarred and feathered, and then challenged Roode to a "Humiliation Match" at Hard Justice. Roode would eventually go on to accept the challenge begrudgingly. Roode won the match, but Gail Kim came to Young's aid. Roode attempted to attack her, but accidentally knocked Ms. Brooks out instead causing her kayfabe injuries. Roode retreated up the ramp, leaving a semi-conscious Ms. Brooks to be tarred and feathered by Young and Kim for fun.

When Adam "Pacman" Jones joined TNA, Young was desperate to get an autograph, but ended up getting attacked by Ron Killings and spray painted by Pacman. Young started teaming up with Shark Boy on a consistent basis, nearly winning the number one contenders spot to the Tag Team Championship. Young was Judas Mesias' opponent in his official debut match, and was badly injured despite Shark Boy's rescue attempt. On the October 4 edition of Impact, Young faced and defeated James Storm in a Gauntlet match when he reversed Storm's sleeper hold into a pin. At Bound for Glory, Young won the 15 men Fight for the Right Battle Royal by pinning Robert Roode with a small package to win the first round. He was eliminated from the tournament in the second round after being pinned by Storm. From there, Young and Storm engaged in a storyline which saw them compete in beer drinking contests, most notably at Genesis, where Young took Storm's World Beer Drinking Championship belt after Storm passed out. Young defended the belt on the November 29 episode of Impact! in a 60-second speed drinking contest and won, but was assaulted by Storm. He went on to defeat both Storm and the Angle Alliance, the latter as Samoa Joe and Kevin Nash's replacement partner for Scott Hall in matches at Turning Point.

==== Super Eric and feud with the Main Event Mafia (2008–2009) ====
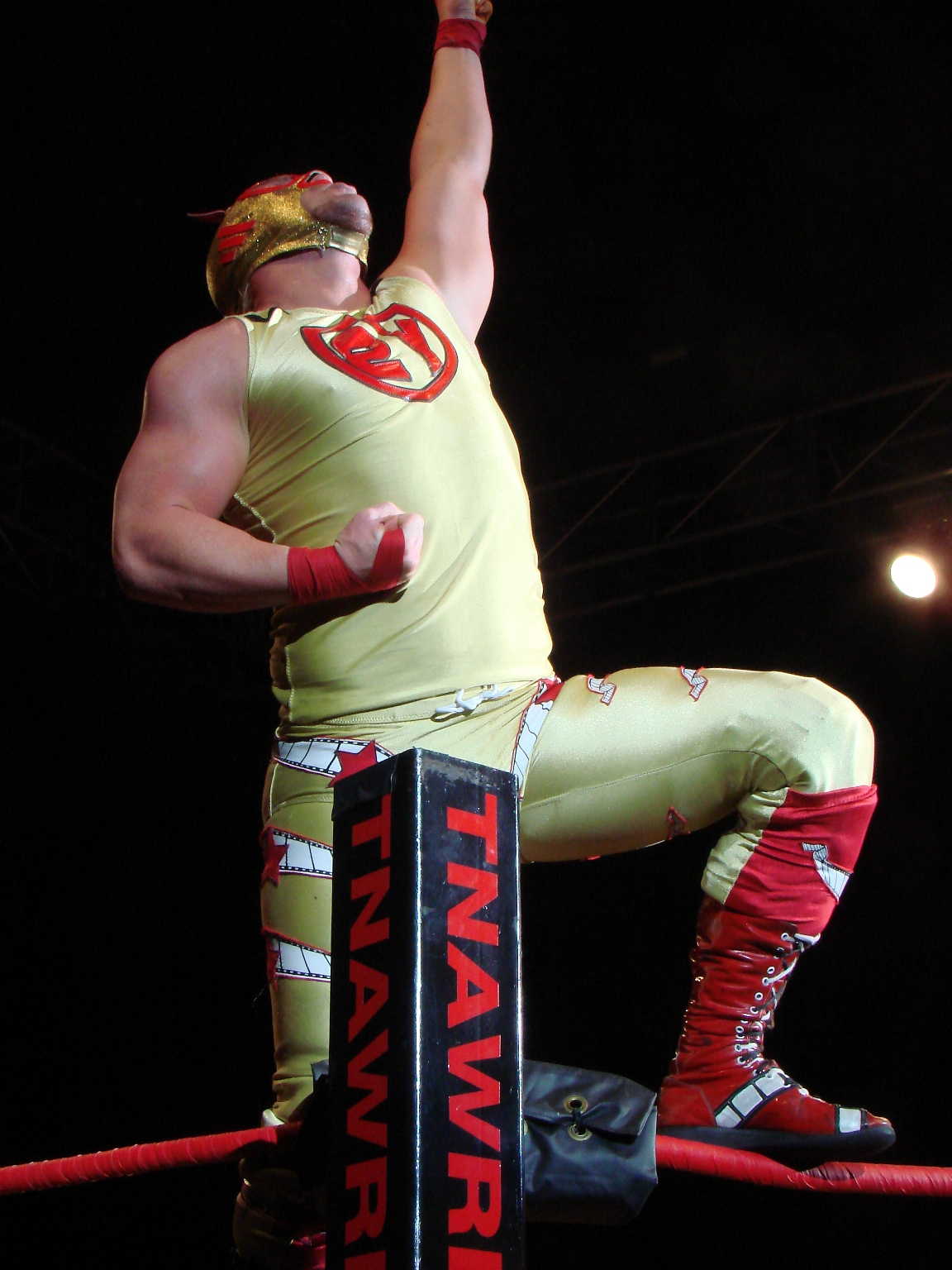
Young as Super Eric

On the February 28 edition of Impact!, Young lost the Beer Drinking Championship in a ladder match to James Storm. Young then participated in a feud with Rellik, losing to Rellik on Impact!. This then led to a match at Destination X with Young teaming up with Kaz to defeat Rellik and Black Reign in a tag match. It was at this pay-per-view that Young debuted a new superhero gimmick under the name "Super Eric", which was supposed to be his alter-ego. At Lockdown, he and Kaz won "The Cuffed in a Cage" match to earn a future Tag Team Championship match. On the April 17 Impact!, Young (who left the match and returned as Super Eric) and Kaz won the World Tag Team Championship, but later in the night were stripped of the titles due to Young not admitting he was Super Eric. On the May 1 Impact!, he teamed up with A.J. Styles, who was desperately looking for a partner backstage, and won against The Rock 'n Rave Infection. He and Styles went to Sacrifice, as part of the Deuces Wild Tournament to crown new Tag Team Champions, but lost to the eventual winners The Latin American Xchange.

Young started a gimmick where he would look around the streets of Memphis, Tennessee for Elvis. The gimmick took a hiatus at Slammiversary, after Awesome Kong attacked a fake Elvis impostor. He revived the Super Eric gimmick on the July 17 Impact! and joined Curry Man and Shark Boy as part of a Justice League parody, called "The Prince Justice Brotherhood", which was at the same time making fun of the former ring name of TNA wrestler Abyss. At Bound for Glory IV, Super Eric competed in a Steel Asylum match, which was won by Jay Lethal.

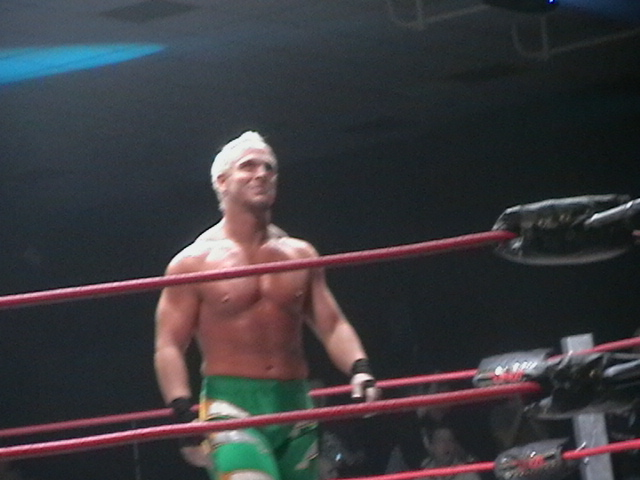
Eric Young at a house show in January 2009

On the October 30 Impact!, A.J. Styles and Samoa Joe created a stable called The TNA Frontline, which was a group which formed a faction of younger wrestlers to oppose the Main Event Mafia. This group included wrestlers like Eric Young, Jay Lethal, Consequences Creed, Petey Williams, O.D.B. and The Motor City Machine Guns. His character evolved as well, as he was no longer paranoid and began showing confidence and leadership abilities. He also stopped being startled by his pyrotechnics. On the November 13 Impact!, Young defeated Sheik Abdul Bashir to win the TNA X Division championship after Bashir shoved TNA Official Shane Sewell to the mat, leading to Sewell attacking Bashir, which gave Young an opportunity to hit the Death Valley driver on Bashir and pin him. The following week on Impact!, however, Young was stripped of his X Division Championship due to Sewell's interference, and the title was awarded back to Bashir. Young was awarded a championship match against Booker T for his TNA Legends Championship but lost due to the interference from Sharmell. At Final Resolution, Sewell once again helped Young defeat Bashir for the X Division Championship. Due to the controversial ending of the match he was stripped of the championship by Jim Cornette, who set up a tournament for the vacant title. Young defeated Bashir in the first quarter-final match of the tournament to move on to the semi-finals. He then lost to Alex Shelley controversially after Chris Sabin interfered to see The Motor City Machine Guns face off in the final, which was won by Shelley at Genesis.

On March 20, 2009, Young appeared on Danny Bonaduce's morning radio show on WYSP in Philadelphia where it was announced that the two of them would wrestle each other at Lockdown. Young bad-mouthed Bonaduce and slapped him twice in the face before being pushed out of the room. At the Lockdown pre-show, Young defeated Bonaduce. After the bout, Bonaduce attacked Young before Rhino came to the ring to aid Young and then hit the Gore on Bonaduce.

==== The World Elite (2009–2010) ====
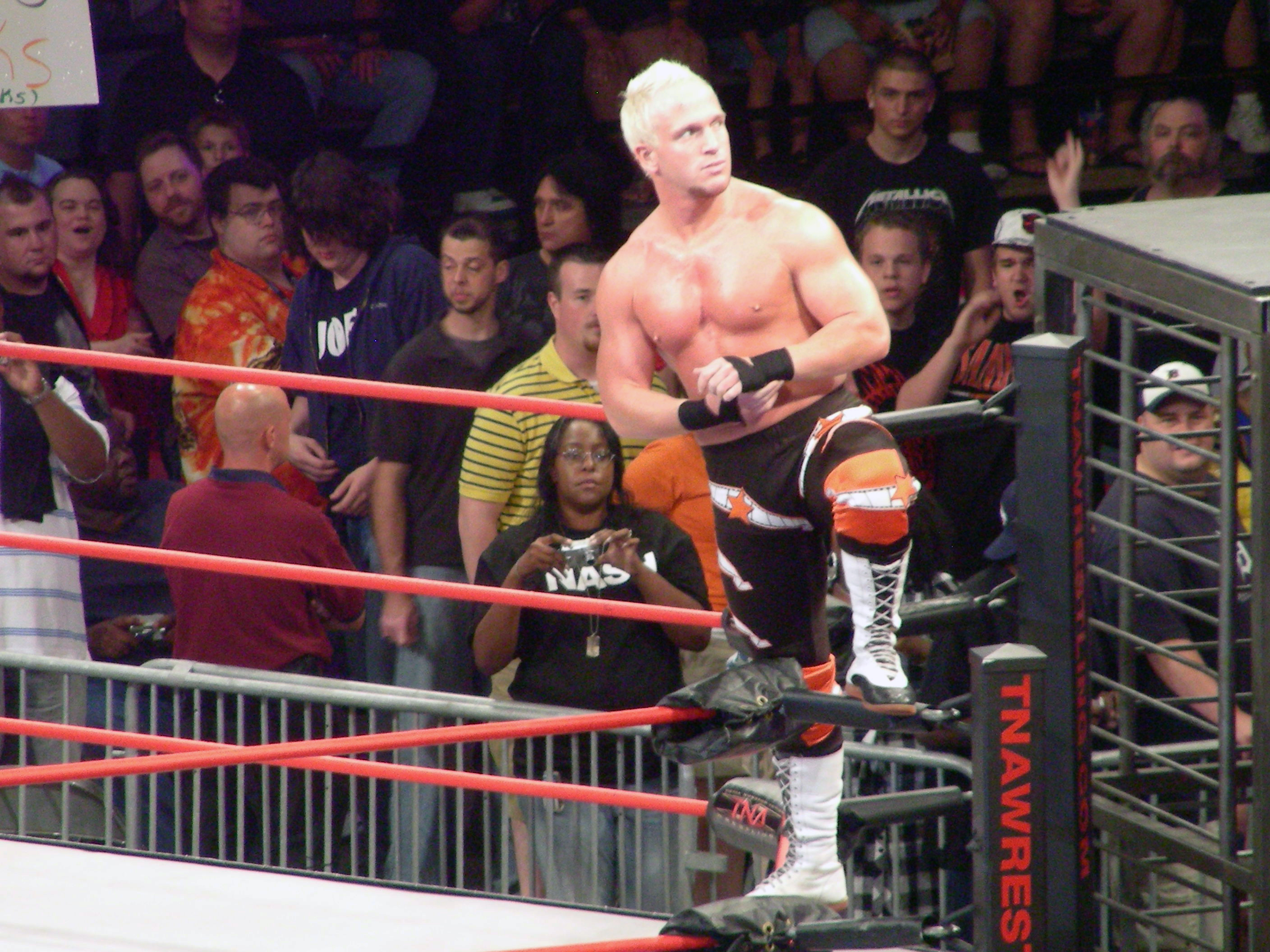
Eric Young at Slammiversary 2009

Young began to show frustration over losses to the likes of Sting and Jeff Jarrett. On the May 28 Impact!, Young turned heel after attacking Jarrett, who had just defeated him in a King of the Mountain qualifying match. The following week he confronted Jarrett and made implications to him paying more attention to wrestling than to his daughters just like his father, which led to Jarrett slapping him and starting a brawl. The following week, Young's good friend Jeremy Borash confronted him in an interview which resulted in Young slapping JB down. At the Slammiversary pre-show, the heel turn was signified even further when he walked out on his tag team partner Rhino in a match against The British Invasion of Doug Williams and Brutus Magnus. His rivalry with Rhino would continue until Young defeated Rhino after a distraction from Rhino's protege Jesse Neal. He would then be chosen by Kurt Angle to be the special guest referee in a 3-way match where Angle faced Jeff Jarrett and Mick Foley. Throughout the match, he would perpetually slow count all of Jarrett's pinfall attempts and at the end of the match, when Angle locked the ankle lock on Foley, he ordered for the bell to be rung even though Foley did not tap out or pass out. After the match, Young got beaten down by Jarrett.

On the July 23, 2009, edition of Impact!, Young apologized for his crude remarks and personal issues with Jeff Jarrett, and wished Mick Foley best of luck in his match against Kurt Angle that night for the ownership of TNA and stated "If you lose TNA, I lose TNA. If I lose TNA, I lose everything." Foley allowed Young to join the team of A.J. Styles, Daniels, James Storm, and Robert Roode to face the British Invasion, Kiyoshi, and Sheik Abdul Bashir in a ten-man tag team match. However, in the conclusion of the match, he turned on the TNA originals by hitting Styles with a spike piledriver and allowing him to be pinned. Eric Young then became leader of a new faction named World Elite, consisting of himself (representing Canada), Bashir (representing Iran), Kiyoshi (representing Japan), and The British Invasion (representing the UK). The following week, Young helped Doug Williams and Brutus Magnus win the IWGP Tag Team Championship from Team 3D. On the August 6 Impact! it was revealed that Kurt Angle and Eric Young had made a deal to turn the Main Event Mafia and the World Elite factions into one super faction. That same night Young debuted a new look shaving his head and wearing new attire in a match where he defeated Daniels. On the September 10 edition of Impact!, World Elite recruited Homicide (representing Puerto Rico) into their group, turning him heel in the process. On the October 1 edition of Impact! the alliance between World Elite and Main Event Mafia came to an end in an all out brawl between the two factions. At Bound for Glory Young pinned Kevin Nash in a three-way dance, which also included Hernandez, to win the TNA Legends Championship. On the October 29 edition of Impact!, Young made his first title defense, losing to Bobby Lashley by disqualification. After the match, Young renamed the Legends Championship to the "TNA Global Championship" and claimed he would not defend it on U.S. soil or against any American wrestler. On the November 19 edition of Impact! Kevin Nash congratulated Young on outsmarting him the previous month and joined World Elite. On January 27, 2010, Young lost the Global Championship to World Elite teammate Rob Terry at a house show in Cardiff, Wales. Since the beginning of 2010 World Elite has not appeared together and the only sign of there still being an alliance between its members, apart from the British Invasion, has been Young teaming up with Kevin Nash on the January 21 edition of Impact! in a losing effort against The Nasty Boys.

==== The Band and mentally challenged gimmick (2010–2011) ====
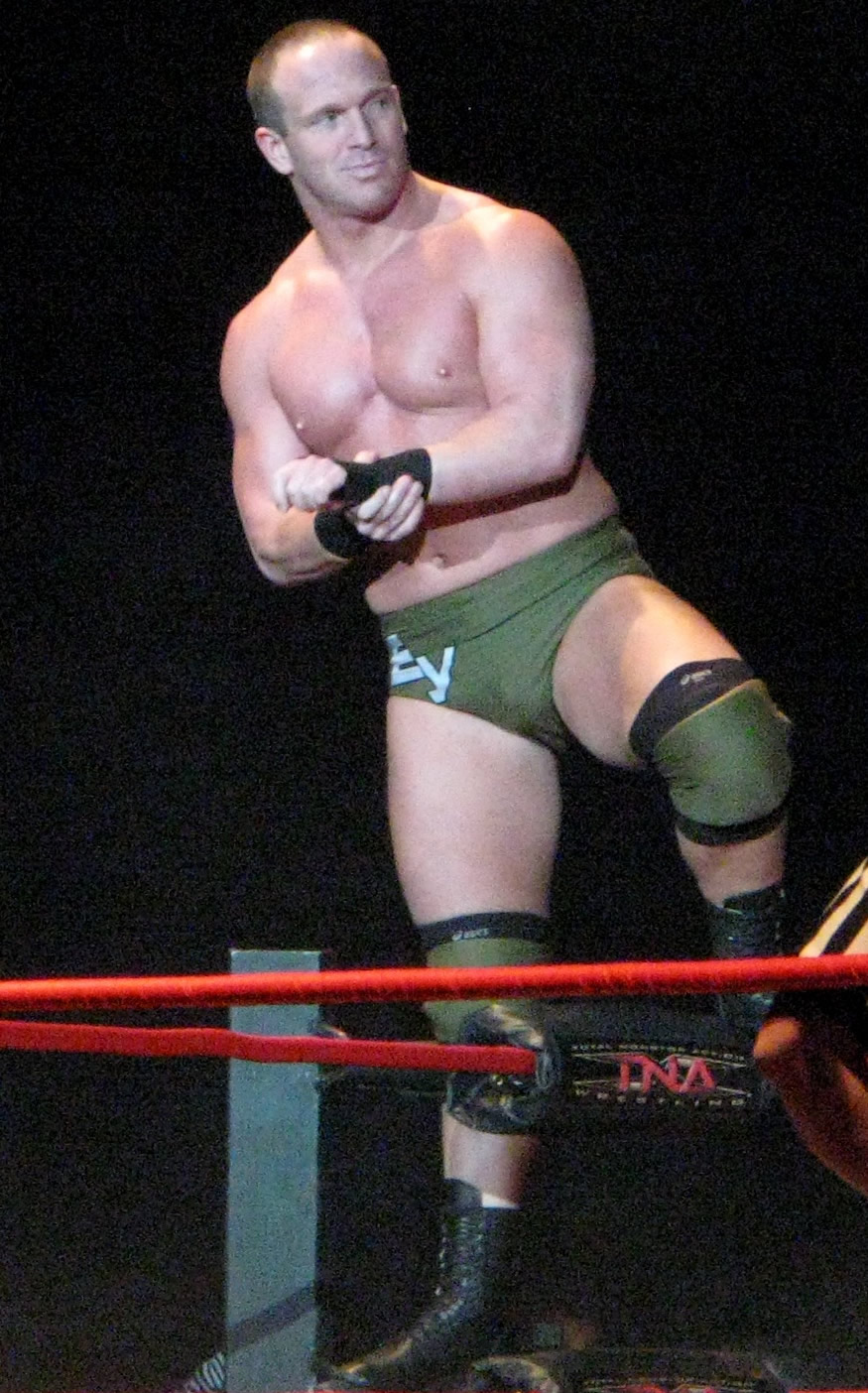
Young in 2010

On the February 11 edition of Impact!, Young started showing signs of a face turn after standing up for Kevin Nash after The Band of Scott Hall and Syxx-Pac had turned on him the previous week. The following week Young and Nash brawled with Hall and Syxx-Pac and on the March 8 edition of Impact! Young defeated Syxx-Pac in a singles match, solidifying his status as a face. At Destination X, Young and Nash faced Hall and Syxx-Pac in a tag team match, where the Band's TNA futures were on the line. In the end, Nash turned on Young and helped the Band pick up the victory, which finally gave them contracts with the company. On the March 29 edition of Impact! Nash offered Young a spot in the Band, claiming that what happened in Destination X was just business and nothing personal. Young refused the offer and in the main event of the evening, teamed up with Rob Van Dam and Jeff Hardy to defeat the Band in a six-man tag team steel cage match. At Lockdown Nash defeated Young in a steel cage match. On the May 3 edition of Impact!, Young turned heel once again by turning on Team 3D and joining The Band. The following week Nash cashed in his "Feast or Fired" contract and teamed with Hall to defeat Matt Morgan for the TNA World Tag Team Championship At Sacrifice, Nash named Young one third of the champions under the Freebird rule. At the June 14 tapings of the June 17 edition Impact! The Band was stripped of the Tag Team Championship, due to Scott Hall's legal problems. The following day it was reported that Hall had been released from his contract with TNA. On the June 24 edition of Impact! Young and Nash decided to part ways, as Nash intended to go after Hogan, whom he blamed for what had happened to Hall and Waltman, and did not want Young to get into trouble for it.

At the July 12, 2010, tapings of Xplosion, Young made his return to singles competition, losing to Suicide. In the finish of the match Young took a bump on his head and on the July 29 edition of Impact! he re-emerged as a face, returning to his comic relief roots with a gimmick of a mentally challenged person, teaming with Orlando Jordan and costing him their tag team match against Ink Inc. (Jesse Neal and Shannon Moore), after throwing a mannequin in the ring, which he had first tagged into the match. The following week Young's antics provided a distraction, which cost Jordan his match against D'Angelo Dinero. Young kept teaming with Jordan the following months, appearing exclusively on Xplosion, before returning to Impact! on the October 7 live edition, where they defeated Ink Inc., after a low blow by Jordan. However, after the match, Young announced that they were forfeiting the match due to the finish and suggested they set up a rematch at Bound for Glory. In storyline, Young's mental issues made him completely unaware of Jordan's bisexual orientation and interest in him. At the pay-per-view, Young's antics cost him and Jordan the match against Ink Inc. On the November 4 edition of Impact!, Young and Jordan were featured in a segment, where they tried to get help from a specialist to improve their relationship with one another. This ended up being Fritz's final appearance for the company on his old contract, which expired shortly thereafter. On November 12, it was reported that Fritz had re-signed with the promotion. Young and Jordan returned to Impact! on December 16, defeating Generation Me (Jeremy and Max Buck) in a tag team match. Prior to the match, Young appeared with the old TNA World Heavyweight Championship belt, which had been thrown away by Immortal, when they introduced the newly designed version of the belt. The following weeks, Young kept walking around with the belt, claiming to be the World Heavyweight Champion. On April 17 at Lockdown, Young and Jordan were unsuccessful in becoming the number one contenders to the TNA World Tag Team Championship in a four tag team steel cage match, which was won by Ink Inc.

On the May 12 edition of Impact!, Young took part in a number one contender's battle royal. After eliminating TNA Television Champion Gunner, Young jumped out of the ring and left the arena with his title. On May 17 at the tapings of the May 26 edition of Impact Wrestling, Young admitted that he had mistakenly taken Gunner's title and agreed to lie down for him in the ring, but ended up double crossing him and pinning him to win the TNA Television Championship, the title formerly known as the TNA Legends and Global Championship, for the second time, which made him the second person to hold the title under all three of its incarnations. On July 10 at Destination X, Young teamed with the returning Shark Boy to defeat Generation Me in a tag team match. As the new Television Champion, Young started a storyline, where he claimed that the title could only be defended against television stars, making a challenge towards American Gladiators alum Matt Morgan and "defending" the title against TNA producer and former cast member of The Wonder Years, Jason Hervey, in a backstage assault, before embarking on a several-week-long trip to Hollywood to find Scott Baio. The trip culminated in a comedy segment on the August 25 edition of Impact Wrestling, where Young pinned Baio to, in his mind, successfully defend the Television Championship. Young returned to in-ring action on the September 8 edition of Impact Wrestling, when he successfully defended the Television Championship against Robbie E. After another successful title defense against Robbie on the October 27 edition of Impact Wrestling, Young was attacked by both Robbie and his bodyguard Rob Terry, which led to him announcing that he was going to bring Ronnie from the television show Jersey Shore to face them the following week. On November 1, Young became the longest reigning TNA Television Champion in history by breaking the previous record of 167 days, held by Rob Terry. On the November 3 edition of Impact Wrestling, Young and Ronnie were attacked by Robbie E and Rob Terry, which led to a tag team match the following week, where Ronnie pinned Robbie for the win. On November 13 at Turning Point, Young lost the Television Championship to Robbie E, following interference from Rob Terry, ending his reign at 180 days. On December 11 at Final Resolution, Young failed to recapture the title from Robbie E in a rematch.

==== Teaming with ODB (2011–2013) ====
On the December 22 edition of Impact Wrestling Young teamed up with ODB in the Wild Card Tournament, advancing to the semi-finals after a win over Anarquia and Shannon Moore. The following week, the team was eliminated from the tournament by Magnus and Samoa Joe. After this loss, Young would pursue a storyline relationship with ODB and the two would begin a feud with Angelina Love and Winter. Young and ODB defeated Love and Winter in a tag team match on the January 26 edition of Impact Wrestling. On the March 8 Impact Wrestling, Young and ODB defeated Gail Kim and Madison Rayne to win the TNA Knockouts Tag Team Championship, making Young the first male wrestler to have held the title and the first wrestler to have held all of TNA's exclusive tag team titles; the NWA World Tag, TNA World Tag and TNA Knockouts Tag Team Championships. After the match, ODB accepted Young's marriage proposal.

Young and ODB made their first title defense two weeks later, when they defeated Mexican America (Rosita and Sarita). Young's and ODB's wedding ceremony took place on the April 12 Impact Wrestling. Three days later at Lockdown, Young and ODB defeated Rosita and Sarita in a steel cage match to retain the Knockouts Tag Team Championship. On May 13 at Sacrifice, Young was defeated by Crimson in a singles match. Afterwards, Young took a hiatus from TNA to film his upcoming Animal Planet program. During the hiatus, Young and ODB became the longest reigning Knockouts Tag Team Champions in history by surpassing The Beautiful People's reign of 141 days on July 19. Young returned to TNA on the August 30 Impact Wrestling, reuniting with ODB after her match with Madison Rayne. Young made his in-ring return on November 11 at Turning Point, teaming with ODB to defeat Tara and Jesse in a non-title mixed tag team match. On the following Impact Wrestling, Young was defeated by Jesse in a singles match. The following week during the TNA Turkey Bowl, Young pinned Jesse in a three-way match, which also included Robbie E and forced Jesse to wear a turkey suit as part of the Thanksgiving theme. After the match, both he and ODB were ambushed by the Aces & Eights and they proceeded to injure Young by hitting his exposed ankle with a ball-peen hammer, while ODB was handcuffed outside the ring and forced to watch. Young returned on the February 28, 2013, episode of Impact Wrestling, being revealed as the final member of Sting's Lethal Lockdown team and attacking their opponents, Aces & Eights. On March 10 at Lockdown, Team TNA, consisting of Young, James Storm, Magnus, Samoa Joe, and Sting defeated Aces & Eights, consisting of Devon, DOC, Garett Bischoff, Knux, and Mr. Anderson in a Lethal Lockdown match, with Young pinning Knux for the win.

On the June 20 episode of Impact Wrestling, Young and ODB were stripped of the Knockouts Tag Team Championship by Brooke Hogan due to Young being a man, ending their reign at a record 478 days. The titles were then retired on June 27.

==== First world title reign (2013–2014) ====
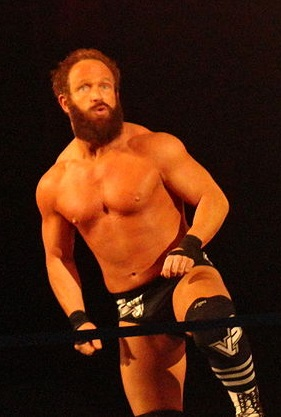
Young in January 2014

On the September 19 episode of Impact Wrestling, Young then returned to singles action when he defeated Robbie E. In September 2013, Young began working and teaming with Joseph Park. On the September 26, episode of Impact Wrestling Young along with ODB and Joseph Park defeated The BroMans (Jessie Godderz and Robbie E) and Gail Kim in a six-person mixed tag team match. At the Bound for Glory pre-show, Young and Joseph Park competed in a tag-team gauntlet match for be the number one contenders to the TNA World Tag Team Championship later that night. However, after eliminating Bad Influence, the team was eliminated by the BroMans. Later, during the PPV, he was attacked by Bad Influence, but was saved by Abyss. On the October 31 episode of Impact, Abyss came to the aid of Young again after he was attacked by Bad Influence, and proved he is no threat to Young. However, on December 5, 2013, Bad Influence revealed the Parks' Law Firm closed 15 years ago. Next week, Park and Young defeated Bad Influence. After the match, Young said to Park that he was Abyss. On December 26, 2013, Young booked a Monster's Ball match between Bad Influence and Park and gave Janice to Park. Joseph won the match when he turned into Abyss. On February 6, 2014, Abyss defeated Young in a Monster's Ball match. However, during the match, Young stripped Abyss' mask, revealing to Park that Abyss and Joseph are the same person. Abyss went on to turn heel as he aligned with Magnus. On March 27 episode of Impact Wrestling, Young lost to Samoa Joe by knockout/submission.

On the April 10 edition of Impact Wrestling, after winning a battle royal earlier in the night to become number-one contender, Young defeated Magnus to become TNA World Heavyweight Champion for the first time in his career. The victory also makes Young the seventh Triple Crown Champion and the fourth Grand Slam Champion in TNA. The following week, Young successfully made his first title defense against Abyss in a Monster's Ball match. At Sacrifice, Young defeated Magnus in a rematch for the title. Proclaiming himself a fighting champion, he successfully defended the TNA World Heavyweight Championship against Bobby Roode on the following Impact Wrestling. On the May 8 episode of Impact Wrestling, Young and Roode agreed to have a rematch, but TNA Director of Operations MVP declined the match and promised Young that he would reveal his opponent at June's Slammiversary event. MVP revealed himself as the opponent, which was shown when he attacked the champion. On May 15, Young challenged MVP to a match, which he agreed, but was disqualified when Kenny King attacked Young. Bobby Lashley pretended to help Young, but he speared him. On June 5, Young, Bully Ray, Austin Aries and Samoa Joe defeated MVP, Kenny King, Bobby Lashley and Ethan Carter III in an eight-man tag team First Blood match. As Aries and Joe had been among MVP's harshest critics, they were put in matches against MVP associates King and Lashley respectively in singles matches at the PPV. MVP was later injured and not able to compete at the PPV, TNA announced on their website Friday before the PPV, that the match will now be a three-way cage match for the title, with the winners of Lashley vs. Samoa Joe and Austin Aries vs. Kenny King qualifying for the match. At Slammiversary XII, Young successfully defended his TNA World Heavyweight Championship against Lashley and Aries. On the June 19 edition of Impact Wrestling, Young lost the title to Lashley. On the July 3 episode of Impact Wrestling, Young had a rematch but failed to regain the title.

==== Championship pursuits and departure (2015–2016) ====
On the January 7, 2015, episode of Impact Wrestling, Young turned heel when he saved Bobby Roode from an attack by MVP, Kenny King, Low Ki and Samoa Joe, but instead hit Roode with a chair, costing Roode his match against Lashley, as well as the TNA World Heavyweight Championship. On the following night's tapings of the January 16 episode of Impact Wrestling, Young defeated Bobby Roode thanks to help from The Beat Down Clan, and assisted the group in beating down World Heavyweight Champion Lashley, who refused to become a part of the new group. Young and Roode would then face off in a variety of matches, including a steel cage match at Lockdown and a Last Man Standing match, both of which Roode won. The feud ended when Young defeated Roode in a submission match using the figure-four leglock. At Slammiversary, Young competed in a King of the Mountain match for the TNA King of the Mountain Championship, against Jeff Jarrett, Matt Hardy, Drew Galloway, and Bobby Roode, but lost the match.

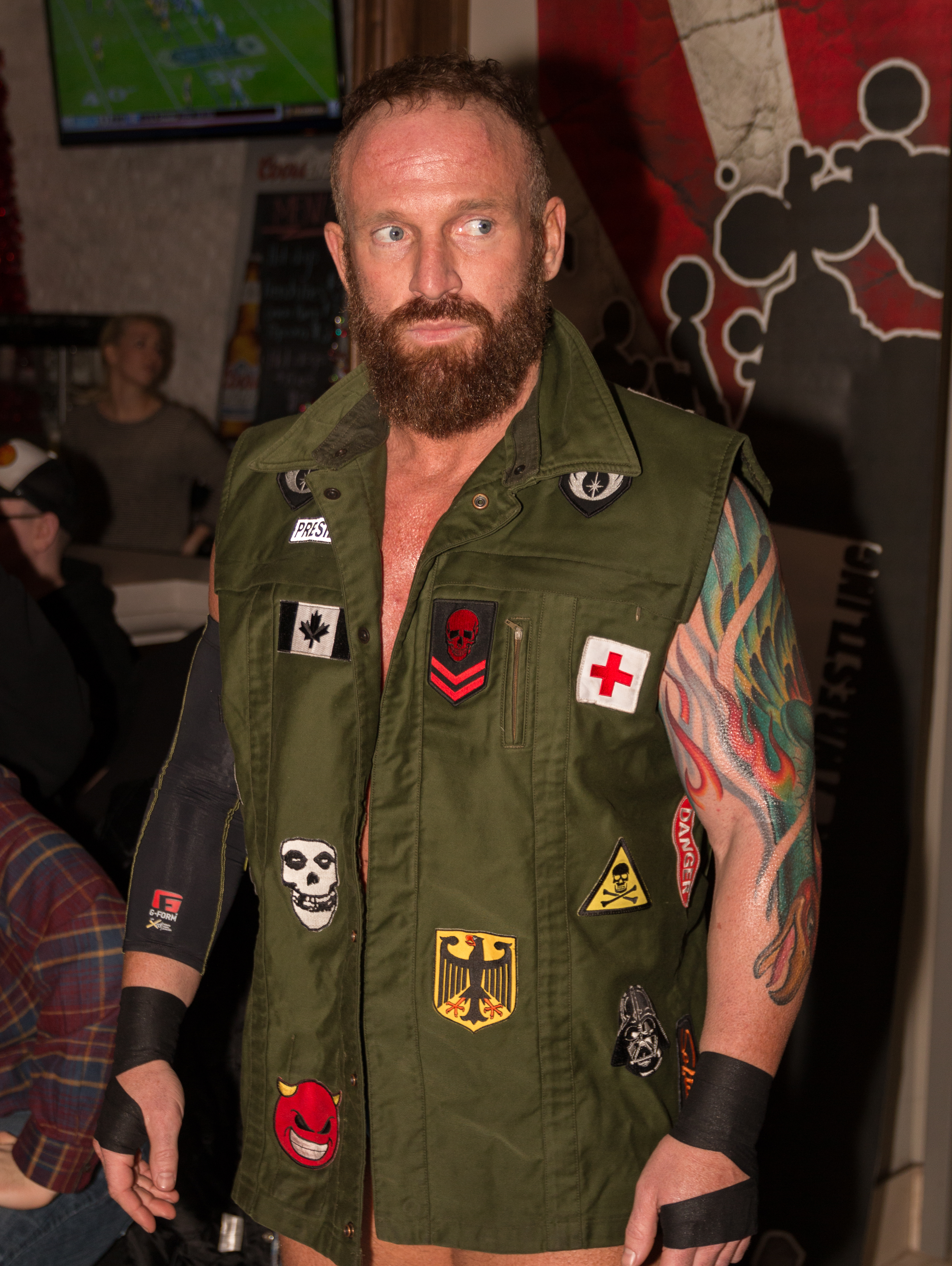
Young in December 2015

At Bound for Glory, Young faced a returning Kurt Angle in a No Disqualification match but lost. During October and November (taped in July), he participated in the TNA World Title Series, where he ended first of his block, tied with Bobby Roode, advancing to the round of 16, but was defeated in the semi-finals by Matt Hardy. On the January 12, 2016 episode of Impact Wrestling, Young defeated Roode to win the TNA King of the Mountain Championship for a record-breaking third time. With this victory, Young is the only wrestler to have held the title in all four of its incarnations. On the January 26 episode of Impact Wrestling, Young formed an alliance with Bram, attacking Jeff Hardy and piledriving him through a table. Eric Young and Bram entered in a feud against Beer Money, after a returning James Storm saved Bobby Roode from an attack of the duo. Eric Young and Bram were defeated by Beer Money at TNA One Night Only, and once again at Lockdown in a Six Sides of Steel match, thus ending the feud. Young entered in a short feud against Jeff Hardy, who defeated him on the March 15 episode of Impact Wrestling in a match to become the number one contender to the TNA World Heavyweight Championship. Young was defeated by Hardy once again in a Six Sides of Steel match on the April 5 episode of Impact Wrestling. The following week, Young and Bram were defeated by Beer Money in a match for the TNA World Tag Team Championship, which also included Decay and the BroMans. During the match, Bram unintentionally hit Young. On the April 17 episode of Impact Wrestling, Eric Young declared that he left TNA with the TNA King of the Mountain Championship with Bram. However, Bram refused, which resulted in Young attacking him. At Sacrifice, Eric Young lost the title to Bram in a Falls Count Anywhere match.

On March 19, 2016, TNA announced that Young would be leaving the company after 12 years.

=== WWE (2016–2020) ===
==== Sanity (2016–2019) ====
Though not under contract, Young appeared on the May 4, 2016, episode of NXT, confronting NXT Champion Samoa Joe. Young then faced Joe in the main event, losing by submission.

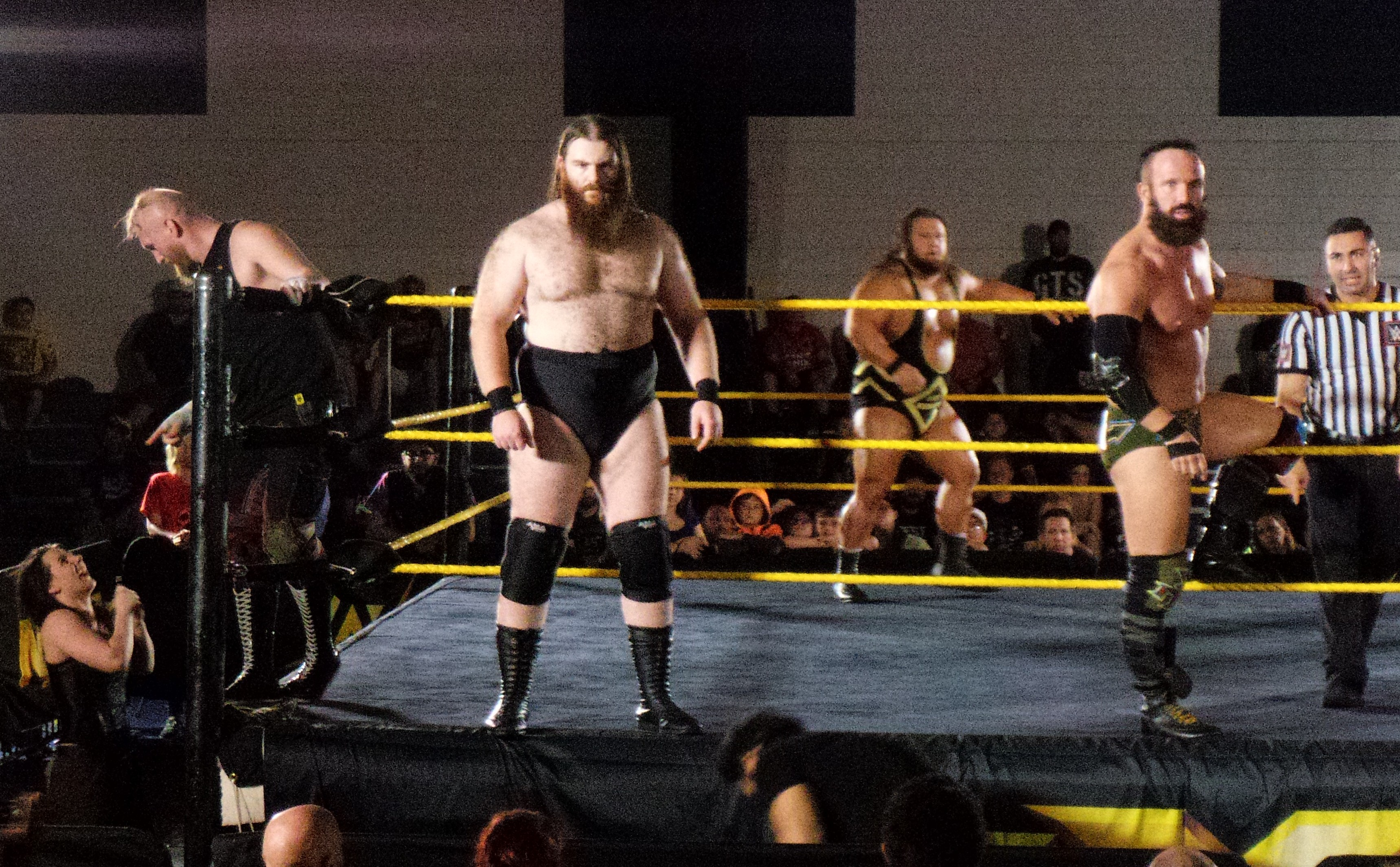
Young (far right) as part of Sanity in May 2017

On the October 12 episode of NXT, Young officially debuted as leader of the villainous stable Sanity, along with Alexander Wolfe, Sawyer Fulton, and Nikki Cross. After Fulton suffered an injury in November, he was replaced by Killian Dain on January 18, 2017, episode of NXT. Young then feuded with Tye Dillinger, who rejected an invitation to join the group. Young defeated Dillinger at NXT TakeOver: San Antonio, and Sanity defeated Dillinger, Kassius Ohno, Roderick Strong, and Ruby Riot in an eight-person mixed tag team match at NXT TakeOver: Orlando, but Young lost to Dillinger in a steel cage match on the April 19 episode of NXT, ending their feud. At NXT TakeOver: Brooklyn III on August 19, Young and Wolfe defeated The Authors of Pain (Akam and Rezar) to win the NXT Tag Team Championship. At NXT TakeOver: WarGames, Sanity lost the WarGames match to The Undisputed Era (Adam Cole, Bobby Fish, and Kyle O'Reilly), that also involved The Authors of Pain and Roderick Strong. On the December 20 episode of NXT, Sanity lost the title to The Undisputed Era, ending their reign at 123 days.

On April 17, 2018, Young and the rest of Sanity, except for Nikki Cross, were drafted to the SmackDown brand as part of the Superstar Shake-up. They debuted on the June 19 episode of SmackDown Live, where they attacked The Usos (Jey Uso and Jimmy Uso). The next week on SmackDown Live, Young made his main roster in-ring debut by answered United States Champion Jeff Hardy's open challenge, which he won by disqualification after The Usos ran in, leading to a six-man tag team match, where Sanity lost. At Extreme Rules, Sanity defeated The New Day (Big E, Kofi Kingston, and Xavier Woods) in a tables match. At Survivor Series, they made up part of Team SmackDown as they took on Team Raw, and they would go on to win the match, although they were eliminated from match. On the April 2, 2019, episode of SmackDown Live, Sanity lost to The Miz in a handicap falls count anywhere match, in what would be their final match as a stable. A WWE.com article blamed their lack of success on SmackDown on being "in the same division as The New Day, The Usos, The Bar, and The Bludgeon Brothers."

==== Singles competition and departure (2019–2020) ====
On April 15, Young was drafted to Raw brand as part of the Superstar Shake-up, separating him from Sanity. His first appearance as a part of the brand was on the May 20 episode of Raw, when he was involved in a scramble to crown the first ever WWE 24/7 Champion, which was ultimately won by Titus O'Neil. In the following months, Young primarily competed on Main Event and suffered many losses and on Raw against the likes of Aleister Black and Andrade. On April 15, 2020, Young was released from his WWE contract as part of budget cuts stemming from the COVID-19 pandemic.

=== Return to Impact Wrestling (2020–2022) ===
At Slammiversary on July 18, 2020, Young made his return to TNA, now known as Impact Wrestling, as a surprise participant in a five-way match for the Impact World Championship where he eliminated Trey before being eliminated himself by Rich Swann. He then proceeded to attack Swann with a steel chair and injure Swann's knee. Following this, he began feuding with Eddie Edwards for the Impact World Championship. On the September 1 episode of Impact, Young defeated Edwards to win the Impact World Championship for the second time. At Victory Road, Young successfully defended the title against Edwards. Young would then continue his feud with Swann after he returned from injury challenging him for the Impact World Championship at Bound for Glory which Young accepted. At the event, Young lost the title to Swann.

After losing the title, Young started a new stable, which was eventually called Violent By Design (VBD). During the last months of 2020 and early months of 2021, the stable included Joe Doering (who made his debut at Turning Point), Deaner (who joined them after he turned on his partner, Cousin Jake), and Rhino. On March 29, Young tore his ACL, but continued to appear alongside VBD. After VBD members Doering and Rhino won the Impact World Tag Team Championship, Young declared the titles belonged to VBD as a group, and as leader, he would decide who defended them, thus giving him and Deaner a share of the titles under the Freebird Rule. At Slammiversary, VBD would lose the titles to The Good Brothers in a four-way tag team match.

After failing to regain the tag titles at Emergence, Young put the blame on Rhino and they tortured him to cure him of "the sickness". On the September 16 episode of Impact!, Young, Deaner, and Doering attacked Rhino, thus kicking him out of the VBD. In the following weeks, VBD started a feud with Rhino's former tag team partner Heath when he saved Rhino from a potential attack by VBD. At Bound for Glory, Doering and Deaner lost to Heath and Rhino. On the October 28 episode of Impact!, Young returned from injury, attacking Heath and Rhino. On November 20, at Turning Point, he teamed with Doering to defeat Heath and Rhino in a rematch.

On January 8, 2022, at Hard To Kill, VBD teamed with The Good Brothers to take on Eddie Edwards, Rich Swann, Willie Mack, Heath and Rhino in a 10-man Hardcore War match in a losing effort. At No Surrender, Young lost to Bullet Club leader Jay White in a match of faction leaders. On March 5, at Sacrifice, VBD defeated The Good Brothers to win the Impact World Tag Team Championship for the second time. VBD then lost the Impact World Tag Team Championships to the Briscoes On the May 12 episode of Impact!, Young won a Gauntlet for the Gold to get an Impact World Championship match against Josh Alexander at Slammiversary. At the event, Young failed to defeat Alexander for the title. On the December 1, 2022 edition of Impact Wrestling, Young was "stabbed" by Violent By Design stablemate Deaner, following that it was reported that Young's contract with Impact had expired thus ending his second tenure with the promotion.

=== Return to WWE (2022–2023, 2025) ===
Fightful Select reported on April 10, 2023, that Young had re-signed with WWE on November 1, 2022, but never appeared on television before being released again per his own request. In a September 2024 interview with Chris Van Vilet, Young revealed that he was originally planned to return in a stable with Bray Wyatt and Uncle Howdy, and the reason behind his release request was due to him refusing to work with Vince McMahon.

On the September 23, 2025 episode of WWE NXT, Young, along with other wrestlers of the TNA roster, took part in a major storyline, where they invaded NXT and brawled with various wrestlers on the NXT roster.

=== Second return to Impact / TNA (2023–2026) ===
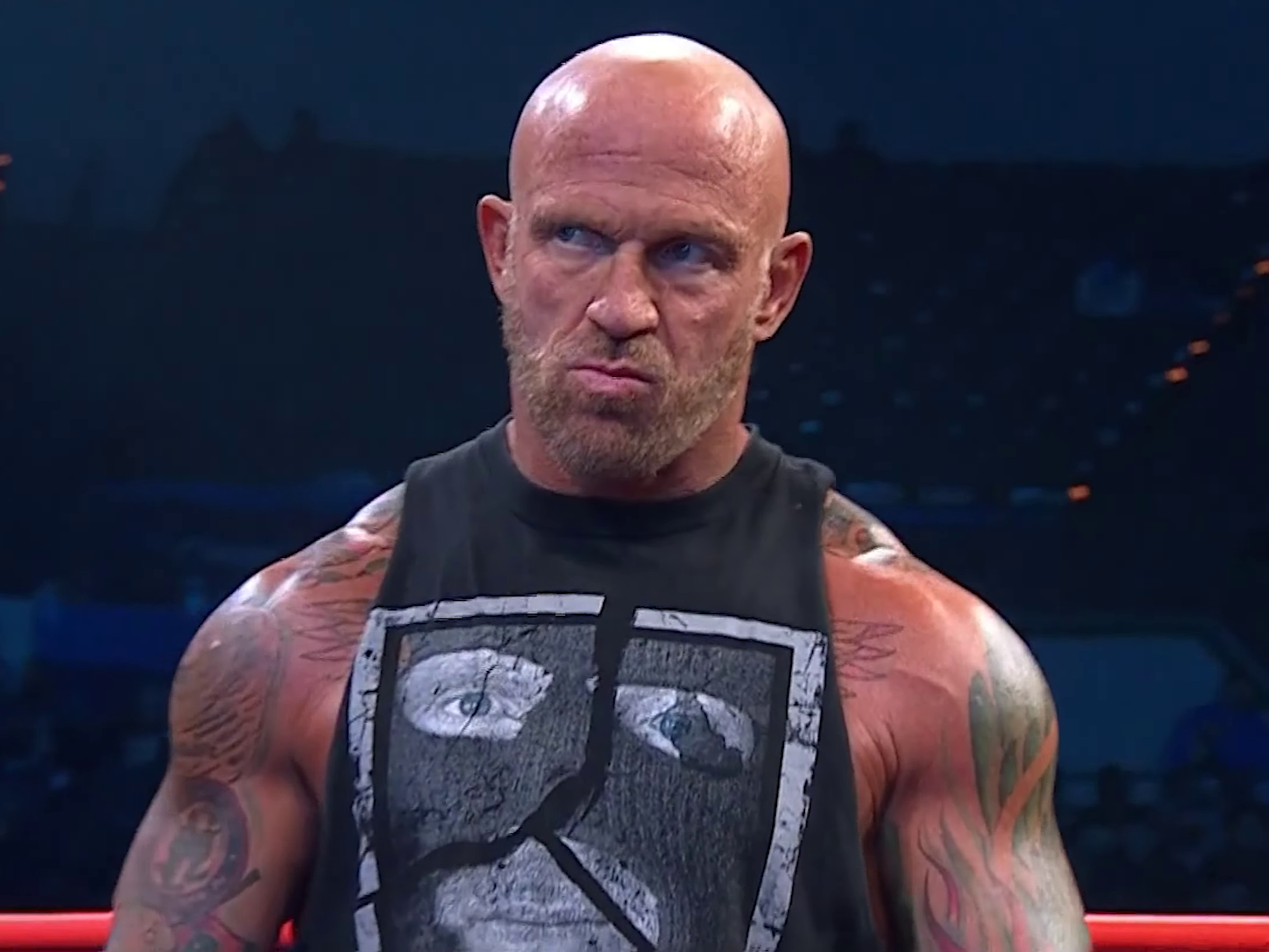
Young in 2026

Young returned to Impact Wrestling at Slammiversary as a face, becoming Scott D'Amore's mystery partner and subsequently defeating Bully Ray and Deaner. On August 27 at Emergence, Young defeated Deaner in a No Disqualification match, ending their feud. Young competed in the Intergender Call Your Shot Gauntlet on October 21 at Bound for Glory, where he eliminated Eddie Edwards before being eliminated by Matt Cardona. On November 3 at Turning Point, Young teamed with Josh Alexander defeating Subculture (Mark Andrews and Flash Morgan Webster). On January 13, 2024, at the "Countdown to TNA Hard to Kill", Young teamed with Frankie Kazarian losing to The System (Eddie Edwards and Brian Myers). On the January 18 episode of TNA Impact!, Young was attacked by Kazarian after the two had lost a tag team match. At No Surrender, Young defeated Kazarian to earn a TNA World Championship match at Sacrifice, which he was unsuccessful at winning the title. On April 20 at Rebellion, Young was defeated by Kazarian in a Full Metal Mayhem match.

On May 3 at Under Siege, Young teamed with Josh Alexander to defeat Frankie Kazarian and Steve Maclin. On June 14 at Against All Odds, the team lost to ABC (Ace Austin and Chris Bey). On the following Impact!, Young lost to Alexander in a "Road to Slammiversary" qualifier to be in a six-way elimination match for the TNA World Championship. On July 20 at the "Countdown to Slammiversary", Young defeated Hammerstone. On August 30 at Emergence, Young defeated Maclin. On September 13 at the "Countdown to Victory Road", Young teamed with Maclin to defeat Hammerstone and Jake Something.

On the January 30, 2025 episode of Impact!, Young turned on Josh Alexander and became the new leader of The Northern Armory, turning heel for the first time since 2022. Young defeated Alexander in the latter's farewell match, with the group's assistance, on the February 13 episode of Impact!. In March, Young began a feud with Steve Maclin, where Young failed to win the TNA International Championship from Maclin in a standard match at Rebellion and a dog collar match on the May 8 episode of Impact!, despite interference by Northern Armory. At Under Siege, The Northern Armory (Young, Judas Icarus and Travis Williams) defeated The System (Moose, Brian Myers and JDC). On the September 11, 2025 episode of Impact!, after Joe Hendry defeated Travis Williams in a match, Young would deliver piledrivers to both Williams and Judas Icarus, officially disbanding The Northern Armory stable. On the September 23 episode of WWE NXT, Young, along with other wrestlers of the TNA roster, took part in a major storyline, where they invaded NXT and brawled with various wrestlers on the NXT roster. At Bound for Glory, Young competed in the 22-person Intergender Call Your Shot Gauntlet but failed to win the match. At Genesis, Young competed in a Four-way match for the TNA International Championship which was won by Channing "Stacks" Lorenzo.

During the January 29, 2026 TNA Impact! episode, Young won the annual Feast or Fired, affording him an opportunity at the TNA X Division Championship. At Sacrifice on March 27, Young invoked his title shot but failed to win the championship from Leon Slater. On June 28 at the pre-show edition of Slammiversary, Young was defeated by Ricky Sosa in what would be his final match in TNA. On July 1, Young requested his release and was granted it by TNA, ending his three-year tenure with the promotion.

=== Second return to WWE (2026–present) ===
Shortly after his TNA departure, Young returned to WWE in July 2026 as a producer for the NXT brand.

== Other media ==
Young appears as a playable character in the video games TNA iMPACT!, WWE 2K18, WWE 2K19 and WWE 2K20.

Fritz has hosted his own television program, Off the Hook: Extreme Catches, on the Animal Planet channel. After the first season ran successfully from July to September 2012, the show returned for a second season from June to August 2013.

On April 26, 2014, Fritz announced that he would host No Limits, scheduled for May 30 on Animal Planet. The show ran for one season, beginning on May 30, 2014. The show consisted of Fritz taking part in various extreme sports and other activities.

== Personal life ==
Fritz has been known for his raspy voice which he attributed to papillomas, which are non-cancerous warts that grow on the vocal cords, and has had 30 surgeries on his throat as of October 2024.

== Championships and accomplishments ==
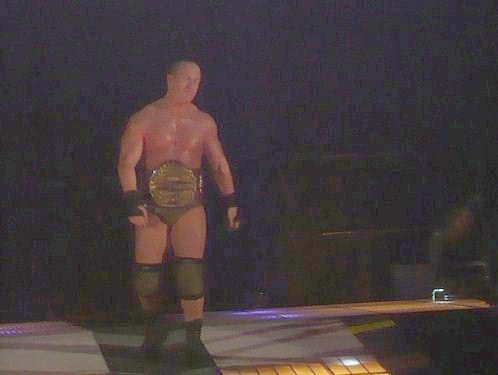
Young as TNA Television Champion

- American Combat Wrestling
  - ACW Heavyweight Championship (1 time)
- Allied Powers Wrestling Federation
  - APWF Cruiserweight Championship (1 time)
- Unlimited Wrestling
  - Red Diamond Cup (2022)
- Family Wrestling Entertainment
  - FWE Heavyweight Championship (1 time)
- Fighting Spirit Pro Wrestling
  - FSPW Independent Championship (2 times)
- Greektown Pro Wrestling
  - Greektown Wrestling Championship (1 time)
- Independent Wrestling Federation
  - IWF Heavyweight Championship (1 time)
- Lariato Pro Wrestling
  - Lariato Pro Championship (1 time)
- Memphis Wrestling
  - Memphis Southern Tag Team Championship (1 time) – with Johnny Devine
- Neo Spirit Pro
  - NSP Independent Championship (1 time)
- Pro Wrestling Illustrated
  - Ranked No. 19 of the top 500 singles wrestlers in the PWI 500 in 2014
- Impact Wrestling/Total Nonstop Action Wrestling/NWA Total Nonstop Action
  - Impact World/TNA World Heavyweight Championship (2 times)
  - TNA X Division Championship (1 time)
  - TNA Legends/Global/Television/King of the Mountain Championship (3 times)
  - TNA World Beer Drinking Championship (1 time)^{2}
  - Impact/TNA World Tag Team Championship (4 times)^{1} – with Kaz (1), Kevin Nash and Scott Hall (1), Rhino, Joe Doering and Deaner (1), Joe Doering and Deaner (1)
  - NWA World Tag Team Championship (2 times) – with Bobby Roode
  - TNA Knockouts Tag Team Championship (1 time) – with ODB
  - TNA Turkey Bowl (2011, 2012)
  - TNA World Cup of Wrestling (2014) – with Bully Ray, Gunner, Eddie Edwards, and ODB
  - King of the Mountain (2016)
  - Gauntlet for the Gold (2022 – Heavyweight)
  - Feast or Fired (2026 – X Division Championship contract)
  - Seventh Triple Crown Champion
  - Fourth Grand Slam Champion
  - TNA / Impact Year End Awards (3 times)
    - Match of the Year (2020) vs. Eddie Edwards vs. Ace Austin vs. Trey vs. Rich Swann at Slammiversary
    - Moment of the Year (2020) – returning to Impact at Slammiversary, shared with the other returns and debuts that night
    - Most Inspirational Wrestler of the Year (2006)
- Wrestling Observer Newsletter
  - Worst Worked Match of the Year (2006) TNA Reverse Battle Royal on TNA Impact!
- WWE
  - NXT Tag Team Championship (1 time) – with Alexander Wolfe
  - NXT Year-End Award (1 time)
    - Tag Team of the Year (2017) – with Alexander Wolfe and Killian Dain
- World Series Wrestling
  - WSW Tag Team Championship (1 time) – with Frankie Kazarian
- Xtreme Wrestling Coalition
  - XWC World Heavyweight Championship (1 time)

^{1} Young defended the championship with either Hall or Nash/Deaner, Rhino or Doering under the Freebird Rule during reigns 2–4.
^{2} Championship not officially recognized by TNA.
