= Roberto Ruspoli =

Italian painter (born 1972)

- Born: Roberto Ruspoli; 27 July 1972 (age 53); Lugano, Switzerland
- Occupation: Artist
- Years active: 2005 - present

Roberto Ruspoli (born 27 July 1972) is an Italian painter. He studied painting at the School of Visual Art in New York.

== Television ==
- 2005 - 2012 Cortesie per gli ospiti, Sky; Real Time
- 2013 - Fuori Menù, Real Time

== Books ==
- L'educazione vi prego sull'amore e altri consigli per vivere bene, 2010, Kowalski
