= Xtraview Encryption System =

Digital terrestrial television access control method

Xtraview Video Encryption System refers to the now-defunct patented "encryption" system used on Xtraview and a number of other Top Up TV services, including Setanta Sports, Television X, Babestation and Red Hot TV.

Unlike the other encryption system used by Top Up TV, Mediaguard, the Xtraview Video Encryption System was not a true encryption system. Instead, an MHEG application directed the user's set-top box to a hidden videostream when a correct PIN is entered. Unlike traditional channel encryption methods, Xtraview did not require a viewing card. This is an advantage over digital terrestrial television in the UK, where the vast majority of set-top boxes have no ability to decrypt pay channels.

Access to a channel protected using the Xtraview technology was granted by calling a premium rate telephone number. During the call, users were asked to give a number displayed on screen. In response, they were given a PIN to unlock the service.

As of 2011 a similar system is in use by Babestation Xtreme, Red Hot TV, Television X and briefly by the now defunct TView on digital terrestrial television.

== Criticism ==
The PIN system has been subject to widespread hacking. Without encryption, the system was easily circumvented by set-top boxes that are able to access individual videostreams when individual stream PIDs are entered. More recently, the PIN algorithm itself was cracked, allowing others to access the service.

Another downfall is that because the application is MHEG generated, if the set-top box was switched off, access to these channels was lost. It is also stated on-screen before purchase that not all boxes are compatible. Another factor is that a few cheaper boxes do not have MHEG support at all, and therefore cannot access the service.
