= Hot Property (British TV series) =

- Starring: Sandy Mitchell (Original series); Tris Payne (2001); Alice Beer (2002–03)
- Country of origin: United Kingdom

Production
- Executive producers: Fenton Bailey; Randy Barbato
- Producer: Andy Harrison
- Running time: 30mins (inc. adverts)
- Production company: World of Wonder

Original release
- Network: Channel 5
- Release: 31 March 1997 – 10 August 1998
- Release: 5 November 2001 – 11 July 2003

Related
- Hot Property (Australian version)

Hot Property is a Channel 5 show in the UK originally broadcast from 1997 to 1998 and hosted by Sandy Mitchell. It was revived from 5 November 2001 to 11 July 2003 in two formats, originally hosted by Tris Payne in 2001 but then replaced by Alice Beer from 2002, when the series was changed into a game show.

An Australian version of the show began on 1 January 1999, hosted by Michael Caton. A 14th season was broadcast on Nine Network in 2013.

== Format ==
=== Revival series ===
For the first series, the host, Tris Payne, followed first-time buyers as they decided from among three properties which to purchase.

From the second and subsequent series, the format was turned into a game show presented by Alice Beer. The show followed first-time buyers trying to win their first step on the property ladder. Each episode had a young couple desperately in need of a home of their own. The contestants view three properties, pick their favorite and then guess the price. If they guess within the allotted amount, they win the house of their dreams.

Programmes were filmed in the UK, along with specials giving British couples a chance to win their dream home in Spain.
