= Off the Hook: Extreme Catches =

- Starring: Eric Young
- Country of origin: United States
- Original language: English
- No. of seasons: 2
- No. of episodes: 20

Production
- Executive producers: David Shadrack Smith; Gregory Henry
- Producer: Dan Bree
- Running time: 30 minutes with commercials
- Production company: Part2 Pictures

Original release
- Network: Animal Planet
- Release: July 30, 2012 – August 11, 2013

Off the Hook: Extreme Catches is an American reality television series that aired on Animal Planet and premiered on July 30, 2012. It was hosted by wrestler Eric Young, who journeys out to meet and fish with the most unusual fishermen he can find.

== Episodes ==
Re-runs of episodes began airing on the Discovery Channel.

=== Season 1 ===
Title	Original air date
"Sailfish Smackdown"	July 30, 2012
"Shark-a-mania"	July 30, 2012
"Running with the Devil"	August 12, 2012
"Amberjacked Up"	August 19, 2012
"Skishing Hell Week"	August 26, 2012
"Beard Gone Grabbling"	September 2, 2012
"Go Ahead, Mako My Day!"	September 16, 2012
"You Don't Know Jack... Crevalle"	September 23, 2012
"Carpocalypse Now"	September 30, 2012

=== Season 2 ===
Title	Original air date
"Hawaiian Lu-OW!"	June 16, 2013
"Deadliest Cod"	June 16, 2013
"Land of 10,000 Iceholes"	June 23, 2013
"Wickeder Tuna"	June 23, 2013
"Kicking Ice"	June 30, 2013
"Aloh-AAHH!"	July 7, 2013
"Eric and Goliath"	July 14, 2013
"Grizzly Eric"	July 21, 2013
"Cull of the Wild Man"	July 28, 2013
"Marlin: Impossible"	August 4, 2013
"Beard in the Big Blue Water"	August 11, 2013

== Reception ==
Common Sense Media rated it 4 out of 5 stars.
