= House Doctor =

- Genre: Reality television
- Directed by: Richard Farmbrough
- Presented by: William Van-Hage (series 1); Tris Payne (series 2); Alistair Appleton (series 3–6)
- Starring: Ann Maurice (1998–2003); Tracy Metro (2016)
- Composer: David Lowe
- Country of origin: United Kingdom
- Original language: English
- No. of seasons: 7

Production
- Executive producer: Peter Fincham
- Producer: Basi Akpabio
- Editors: Daisy Goodwin; Tracey Jury; Paddy Lynas
- Running time: 30 minutes (inc. adverts)
- Production companies: Talkback (1998–2003); Boundless (2016)

Original release
- Network: Channel 5
- Release: 24 August 1998 – 6 November 2003

House Doctor is a television programme, originally broadcast on Channel 5 in the United Kingdom. Each week, the House Doctor – Californian real-estate stylist, Ann Maurice – helps British home-owners sell their houses with her industry know-how and style tips. The popularity of the show has lent the word "house doctoring" to the British English lexicon, which is similar to the American term home staging. This programme is now shown in many countries around the globe, which is broadening the use and familiarity of this term.

== Format ==
Developed by Talkback Productions, the 30-minute show opens with a presenter (a male to off-set Maurice), who shows to the present owners a video recording of the reactions of a number of prospective purchasers viewing the house, and their (negative) feedback. Maurice then enters the house during the video, and chats with the owners about the feedback and the major areas they can improve for a budget of around 1% of sales price. Maurice then instructs the presenter, the owners, and some hired-in local tradesman, on the work, which is seen in some detail, with an explanation as to why this is being done and how to make best costs. The show then ends with Maurice touring the revamped house, and new feedback from the original viewers. The owners then give feedback on the experience, and a voiceover at the end confirms the current sales status.

== History ==
The show was broadcast on 24 August 1998 on Channel 5, and has run for seven series. The presenter for series one was William Van-Hague.

The presenter for series two was Tris Payne, but he left the show to move to BBC One to present the daily morning show Real Rooms. He was replaced by Alistair Appleton for series three to six. Maurice then became the presenter of House Doctor, and the show was extended to 60 minutes to include gardens.

There have also been a series of spin-off shows and specials, including House Doctor – Top 10! things that you need to fix to sell your house, House Doctor – A-Z of Design, House Doctor: Inside and Out, House Doctor, Designs for Living, Interior Rivalry and a documentary entitled, House Doctor: We Love You!

House Doctor returned to Channel 5 for a new series on 3 October 2016 with American interior designer Tracy Metro replacing Ann Maurice. Channel 5 have ordered 45 new episodes.

The show is often repeated early in the morning on Channel 5, usually at 4am or 5am, before Milkshake! begins.

== Overseas editions ==
House Doctor is now broadcast in a number of countries via the BBC Worldwide network and its partners, including USA, South Africa, New Zealand, Canada, and Poland
