= Real Time (TV channel) =

- Country: Italy
- Broadcast area: Sub-Saharan Africa (in English)

Programming
- Languages: Italian; English (African version only)
- Picture format: 1080i HDTV

Ownership
- Owner: Telecom Italia Media (2001-2009); Switchover Media (2009-2013); Discovery Italia (2013-2022); Skydance Corporation (2022-present)
- Sister channels: (Warner Bros. Discovery Italy); Nove; Discovery; Discovery Turbo; DMAX; Food Network; Frisbee; Giallo; HGTV; K2 (Warner Bros. Discovery Africa); Discovery Channel; Animal Planet; TLC; Eurosport 1 Eurosport 2 Discovery Family; Investigation Discovery; Travel Channel; Food Network

History
- Launched: 1 October 2005; 21 years ago
- Closed: 1 December 2020; 5 years ago; (+1 channel)
- Former names: Discovery Real Time (2005–2010)

Links
- Website: realtimetv.it

Availability

Terrestrial
- Digital: Channel 31 (HD)
- GOtv (Sub-Saharan Africa): Channel 12 (African version)
- DStv (Sub-Saharan Africa): Channel 155 (African version)
- Zuku TV (Kenya): Channel 102 (African version)

Streaming media
- Discovery+: Real Time HD (Italian version)

Real Time (Discovery Real Time until 31 August 2010) is an Italian television channel owned by Skydance Corporation.

The channel launched on 1 October 2005, becoming the sixth Discovery network to launch in Italy. It showed lifestyle programmes targeting a female upper-class audience of 25- to 44-year-olds. It features both foreign programmes and Italian programmes produced for the channel.

On 7 April 2009 the channel adopted a new logo and a new look. This look had previously been adopted by Discovery Real Time France.

After becoming the most viewed non-fiction entertainment channel on the Sky Italia platform, on 1 September 2010, it changed its name to "Real Time", and became available both on digital terrestrial and via free-to-air satellite, also joining the Tivùsat platform.

On 8 November 2010 the +1 version of the channel began, and from 1 February 2012 it also broadcasts in high definition.

On 13 March 2019 the SD version on the satellite definitively closed.

From 9 April Real Time, together with the other free channels of the group, became available also in HD streaming on the Dplay platform.

From 1 March 2019, on Tivùsat, the "HD" and "+1" versions replace the SD version, therefore they become visible to LCN 31 and 131 respectively.

On 1 December 2020 Real Time +1 was discontinued.

The channel broadcasts both foreign programmes and a few original Italian productions. Most acquired programmes were originally produced for the American TLC or the British Channel 4.

== Original programs ==
- Cerco casa disperatamente
- Chef a domicilio
- Clio Make Up
- Com'è fatto con Barbara
- Cortesie per gli ospiti
- Cortesie per gli ospiti New York
- Cucina con Ale
- Cuoco gentiluomo
- Diario di un chirurgo
- Dimmi di sì
- Donne mortali
- Fuori menù
- Guardaroba perfetto
- Il re del cioccolato
- Il boss delle cerimonie
- Life Shock
- L'eleganza del maschio
- L'ost
- Ma come ti vesti?!
- Mamma mia
- Matrimonio all'italiana
- Merry Christmas con Csaba
- Non solo magre
- Paint Your Life
- Reparto maternità
- Se balli ti sposo
- Shopping night
- Stelle e padelle
- Torte in corso con Renato
- Tutto in un Weekend
- Vendo casa disperatamente
- Wedding Planners
- Shopping Night
- Zenzero

== Imported programs ==
- 24 ore in sala parto
- 290 chili, vergine
- Abito da damigella cercasi
- Abito da sposa: Beverly Hills (Brides of Beverly Hills)
- Abito da sposa cercasi
- Abito da sposa cercasi XXL
- Adolescenti XXL (Too Fat for 15)
- Basta: io o il cane
- Bimbi fatti in casa
- Cher: Mia figlia cambia sesso (Becoming Chaz)
- Chirurgia XXL
- Cucina con Buddy (Kitchen Boss)
- Emozioni in vitro
- Fantasmi
- Gite gastronomiche
- Il cibo ti fa bella Australia
- Il giardiniere
- Il mio grosso grasso matrimonio gypsy (My Big Fat Gypsy Wedding)
- Io e la mia ossessione (My Strange Addiction)
- I peggiori cuochi d'America
- Jo Frost: SOS genitori (Supernanny)
- L'aggiustatutto a domicilio
- La fabbrica del cioccolato
- Little Miss America (Toddlers & Tiaras)
- Mad Fashion
- Malattie imbarazzanti (Embarrassing Bodies)
- Malattie imbarazzanti XXL
- Malattie misteriose
- Mamme che amano troppo
- Million Dollar Decorators
- Mob Wives
- Monster House
- My Shocking Body
- Non sapevo di essere incinta
- Obiettivo peso forma
- Party Mamas
- Pazzi per la spesa (Extreme Couponing)
- Quattro matrimoni (Four Weddings)
- School Mum Makeover
- Sepolti in casa (Hoarding: Buried Alive)
- Storia di un bebè (A conception story)
- Tabatha mani di forbice (Tabatha Takes Over)
- Torte da record
- Transgender e incinta
- Vita al pronto soccorso (24 Hours in A&E )
- Cucina con Buddy (Kitchen Boss)
- Cucine da incubo USA (Kitchen Nightmares)
- Cucine da incubo (Kitchen Nightmares)
- Extreme Makeover: Diet Edition (Extreme Makeover: Weight Loss Edition)
- Fashion Star
- Grassi contro magri (Supersize vs Superskinny)
- Grassi contro magri teenager
- Il boss delle torte (Cake Boss)
- Il boss delle torte: la sfida (Next Great Baker)
- Top Chef Masters (Top Chef Masters)
- Top chef:solo dessert (Top Chef: Just Desserts)
- Top Gear

== Presenters ==
- Roberto Ruspoli
- Enzo Miccio
- Renato Ardovino

== African version ==
In 2018, an English version which took its content from TLC alongside other Discovery brands with the same styling as the Italian version was also made available in South Africa from 3 September through MultiChoice's DStv and a year later across Africa. The channel is also available to StarTimes and Canal+ Afrique within the region. Real Time is now on Zuku TV channel 102 replacing Fine Living on channel 710 in January 2021.
