= Discovery Real Time =

UK TV learning channel (1992–2013)

- Country: United Kingdom

Programming
- Picture format: 576i (16:9 SDTV)
- Timeshift service: Discovery Real Time +1

Ownership
- Owner: Discovery Networks UK
- Sister channels: Animal Planet; Discovery Channel; Discovery HD; Discovery History; Discovery Home & Health; Discovery Science; Discovery Shed; Discovery Travel & Living; Discovery Turbo; DMAX; Investigation Discovery; Quest

History
- Launched: 9 March 1992; 34 years ago
- Closed: 30 April 2013; 13 years ago
- Replaced by: TLC
- Former names: The Learning Channel (1992–1997); Discovery Home & Leisure (1997–2005)

Discovery Real Time was a British television channel owned by Discovery Networks UK focused on educational and learning content.

== History ==
It was originally launched on 9 March 1992 as The Learning Channel, United Kingdom's version of the American television network of the same name as a daytime service from Intelsat, mostly aimed at cable systems, and was initially broadcast on the Discovery Channel's frequency.

When the Discovery Channel launched on Astra satellite on 22 July 1993, it didn't initially carry The Learning Channel in the daytime and continued as a cable-only channel. In September 1994 the channel became known as TLC ahead of its launch on Astra on 3 October 1994 where it shared a transponder on the Astra 1C satellite with the Discovery Channel, with TLC airing between 9am and 4pm. It was later rebranded as Discovery Home & Leisure on 3 April 1997, but full day broadcasting started with the launch of Sky Digital from 1 October 1998. On 22 May 2001, a timeshift channel called Discovery Home & Leisure +1 was launched.

From 1997 to 2002, the logo was a blue oblong containing a window, however this was changed to a red background featuring a stylised 'H&L', staying like this until 2005.

Former logo

The channel was relaunched as Discovery Real Time on 7 May 2005 in the British market. The channel aimed at complementing the female-skewed Discovery Home & Health (which itself replaced Discovery Health). A sister channel called Discovery Real Time Extra was launched on 22 August 2005. On 20 March 2009, it was replaced with Discovery Shed.

Discovery Real Time is also available in some other regions, including France and Italy. The channel used to be available in Asia since October 2008, and it has become the Indian version of Discovery Turbo.

The channel closed along with Discovery Travel & Living at 6.00am on 30 April 2013, to be replaced by TLC and Investigation Discovery +1. The final signature programme for Discovery Real Time was Bob Ross' The Joy of Painting, given that TLC chasing a completely different demographic than the old version and treating it as a new channel launch rather than a return.

In 2018, the channel launched in South Africa for MultiChoice's DStv on 15 April 2019, as well as StarTimes (channel 161 satellite, channel 158 terrestrial) and in 2020 on Canal+ Afrique (channel 47 and 400).

== See also ==
- Timeline of cable television in the United Kingdom
- Real Time (TV channel)
