= Discovery (UK & Ireland) =

Discovery Channel
- Country: United Kingdom
- Broadcast area: United Kingdom; Ireland

Programming
- Language: English
- Picture format: 2160p UHDTV (downscaled to 1080i and 16:9 576i for the HDTV and SDTV feeds, respectively)
- Timeshift service: Discovery Channel +1

Ownership
- Owner: Skydance Corporation
- Sister channels: Animal Planet; CNN International; Cartoon Network; Boomerang; Cartoonito; Discovery History; Discovery Science; Discovery Turbo; DMAX; Eurosport; Food Network; Investigation Discovery; Quest; Quest Red; Really; TLC; TNT Sports

History
- Launched: 1 April 1989; 37 years ago

Links
- Website: discoveryuk.com

Availability

Streaming media
- Sky Go: Watch live (UK and Ireland only)
- Virgin TV Go: Watch live (UK only); Watch live (+1) (UK only)
- Virgin TV Anywhere: Watch live (Ireland only)

Discovery Channel (often referred to as simply Discovery) is a British pay television channel, operated by Skydance Corporation. Its programming is based on programming produced by Discovery Networks Europe, Discovery Channel Canada and Discovery Channel from the US.

== History ==
It first became available in the UK on 1 April 1989 when Discovery Channel Europe was launched. It was the first extension of the Discovery Channel outside the United States.

Prior to 1993, satellite viewers in the UK could receive the channel from Intelsat satellites at 27.5° West. In July 1993, the Discovery Channel launched on the Astra 1C analogue satellite on the popular 19.2° East position where it used to broadcast only in the evening, starting at 4 pm. On Astra, the daytime space was filled by CMT Europe until 1994, when TLC (later on Discovery Home & Leisure) moved there. Eventually, Discovery Home & Leisure would broadcast until 4 pm when Discovery Channel would take over, and broadcast for ten hours until 2 am.

On 19 August 1998, it was announced that with the launch of Sky Digital on 1 October 1998, The original namesake American channel would expand its broadcast hours to begin at 8 am, now broadcasting for 18 hours per day. This did not apply to the analogue version which kept its start time at 4 pm. On the same day, it was announced that several new Discovery networks would launch, one of which was the timeshift service Discovery +1, the first of its kind in the UK.

Analogue broadcasts were terminated in 2001.

On 22 May 2006, Discovery HD was made available on Sky as part of the Sky HD launch line-up. It was also made available on Virgin Media's cable service on 1 April 2010. From 30 June 2011 Discovery HD began to simulcast Discovery Channel in high-definition rather than use a separate schedule.

The channel briefly had a 90-minute timeshift, called Discovery Channel +1.5. It launched on 25 June 2007. It was replaced by Discovery Science +1 on 21 April 2008.

An Irish advertising feed was launched in 2010. Sky Media Ireland operates the channel's output in terms of advertising, sponsorship and scheduling.

In January 2011, Discovery Channel UK released its new look which places its emphasis on the D-globe logo. The project was created by DixonBaxi and Double G Studios.

On 25 January 2017, Discovery UK announced that they were in a dispute over the fees paid by Sky for broadcast rights and for a time it seemed as though the channels could be removed from the platform after the end of that month. However, an agreement was reached and programming continued uninterrupted.

On 28 November 2022, Discovery launched on BT TV and it launched in the BT TV Player as well and it will be added from value packages as well.

== See also ==
- Timeline of Discovery in the UK
