= List of programmes broadcast by Cartoon Network (United Kingdom and Ireland) =

The following is a partial list of programmes shown in the United Kingdom and Ireland by the TV channel, Cartoon Network.

== Current programming ==
=== Original programming ===
==== Cartoon Network Studios ====
- Adventure Time: Side Quests (5 October 2026)
- Regular Show: The Lost Tapes (11 May 2026)

==== Warner Bros. Animation ====
- Teen Titans Go! (7 April 2014)

==== Hanna-Barbera Studios Europe ====
- The Wonderfully Weird World of Gumball (6 October 2025)

==== Acquired programming ====
- Goat Girl (2 March 2026)
- Lana Longbeard (3 November 2025)
- LEGO City: No Limits MAX (3 August 2026)
- Mr. Bean: The Animated Series (2011–2012; 2021; 3 March 2024)

=== Repeats of ended series ===
==== Cartoon Network Studios ====
- Adventure Time (30 January 2011)
- Clarence (3 November 2014)
- Regular Show (28 February 2011)

==== Hanna-Barbera Studios Europe ====
- The Amazing World of Gumball (2 May 2011)
- The Heroic Quest of the Valiant Prince Ivandoe (13 May 2023)

== Former programming ==
- 2 Stupid Dogs/Super Secret Secret Squirrel (1993 – 2000)
- The 13 Ghosts of Scooby-Doo
- The Addams Family
- The Addams Family
- The Adventures of Batman
- The Adventures of Batman & Robin
- The Adventures of Don Coyote and Sancho Panda
- The Adventures of Gulliver
- The Adventures of Rocky and Bullwinkle and Friends
- The Adventures of Superboy
- AKA Cult Toons (1998 – August 2001)
- All Dogs Go to Heaven: The Series (1997 – 2000)
- The All-New Super Friends Hour
- All-New Pound Puppies (1993 – 1998)
- Alvin and the Chipmunks (1994 – 1995)
- The Amazing Adrenalini Brothers (2007)
- The Amazing Chan and the Chan Clan
- Angela Anaconda (2000 – 2002)
- Angelo Rules (29 November 2010 – 2011)
- Animaniacs (1995 – 2002)
- Apple & Onion (2018 - 2026)
- Aquaman (1993 – 1997)
- Arabian Knights (1993 – 1999)
- The Archie Show
- Archie's Comedy Hour (1995 – 1996)
- Archie's Fun House (1995 – 1996)
- Astro Boy (November 2005 – 12 June 2006)
- Atom Ant (1993 – 1997)
- Atomic Betty (1 November 2004 – 2006)
- Augie Doggie and Doggie Daddy (1993 – 2000)
- Baby Blues (7 June 2002 – 2003)
- Baby Looney Tunes (June 2005 – 2006)
- Bakugan Battle Brawlers (8 September 2008 – 2010)
- Bakugan: Battle Planet (1 September 2018 – 18 November 2020)
- Bakugan: Gundalian Invaders (January 2011 – 2012)
- Bakugan: Mechtanium Surge (27 February 2012)
- Bakugan: New Vestroia (2010 – 2011)
- The Banana Splits (1993 – 2000)
- Barney Bear (1994 – 1998)
- Batfink (1994 – 1997)
- The Batman (2006 – 2008)
- Batman: The Animated Series (1993 – 2000)
- Batman Beyond (2000 – 2003; 2006)
- Batman: The Brave and the Bold (April 2009 – July 2019)
- Batman with Robin the Boy Wonder (1997 – 1998)
- Battle B-Daman (2005 – 2006)
- Be Cool, Scooby-Doo! (27 October 2015 – June 2016)
- Bedrock Cops (1993 – 1997)
- Beetlejuice (1995 – 2001)
- Ben 10 (2005) (4 March 2006 – 2018)
- Ben 10 (2016) (10 October 2016 - 2024)
- Ben 10: Alien Force (16 February 2009 – 2013)
- Ben 10: Omniverse (2012 – 2015)
- Ben 10: Ultimate Alien (October 2010 – 2013)
- Ben 10 Ultimate Challenge (29 October 2011 – 2012)
- Best Ed (2009)
- Beyblade (2003 – 2005)
- Beyblade G Revolution (June 2004)
- Beyblade V-Force (March 2004)
- Big Bag (1999 – 2000)
- The Big O (2004)
- Birdman and the Galaxy Trio (1993 – 1999)
- The Biskitts (1993 – 1999)
- Blackstar (1995 – 1996)
- Blinky Bill (1994 – June 2001)
- Blue Submarine No. 6 (January 2001 – 2002)
- The Brady Kids
- The Brak Show (2001 – 2004)
- BraveStarr (1994 – 1998)
- Breezly and Sneezly (1993 – 1997)
- The Buford Files
- The Bugs Bunny Show
- Bugs 'n' Daffy (1996 – 2000)
- Butch Cassidy and the Sundance Kids (1993 – 1998)
- Camp Lazlo (November 2005 – 2011)
- Capitol Critters (1994 – 1997)
- Captain Caveman and Son (1995 – 1996)
- Captain Caveman and the Teen Angels (1993 – 2000)
- Captain Planet and the Planeteers (1994 – 1999)
- Cartoon Cartoons (1999 – 2018)
- Casper and the Angels (1994 – 1998)
- Cattanooga Cats (1994 – 1999)
- Cave Kids (1997 – 2002)
- CB Bears (1993 – 1997)
- Centurions
- Challenge of the GoBots (1994 – 1999)
- Challenge of the Superfriends (1993 – 1997)
- The Charlie Brown and Snoopy Show
- Chowder (20 April 2009 – 2015)
- Chris Colorado (2001 – 2006)
- Christopher Crocodile (1995 – 1998)
- City of the Morks (2007 – 2009)
- Class of 3000 (2007; 2011 – 2012)
- Clue Club (1993 – 1998)
- Cloudy with a Chance of Meatballs (August 2017 – February 2020)
- Coconut Fred's Fruit Salad Island
- Code Lyoko (2005 – 2006)
- Codename: Kids Next Door (October 2003 – 2009)
- The Completely Mental Misadventures of Ed Grimley (1995 – 1997)
- Count Duckula (1994 – 1999)
- Courage the Cowardly Dog (2000 – 31 March 2014)
- Cow and Chicken (September 1997 – 1 April 2014)
- Cowboy Bebop (2001 – 2004)
- The Cramp Twins (3 September 2001 – 1 April 2014)
- Craig of the Creek (2 October 2018 - 30 January 2026)
- Cubix: Robots for Everyone (2002 – 2004)
- Cyborg 009 (2001 – 2004)
- Da Boom Crew (5 September 2005 – 2007)
- Danger Mouse (1995 – 2001)
- Dastardly and Muttley in Their Flying Machines (1993 – 2002)
- Devlin (1993 – 1999)
- Dexter's Laboratory (September 1996 – 2008; 2009 – 2012)
- Dingbat (1993 – 1997)
- Dink, the Little Dinosaur (1993 – 2001)
- Dino and Cavemouse (1995 – 1997)
- Dirty Dawg (1993 – 1997)
- Dragon Ball Z (Ocean Dub, Funimation Dub & Westwood Media Dub) (6 March 2000 – 2002)
- Dragon's Lair (1993 – 1997)
- Drak Pack (1995 – 1999)
- DreamWorks Dragons (2013 – 2015)
- Droopy (1993 – 2000)
- Droopy, Master Detective (1995 – 2001)
- Duck Dodgers (2005 – 2006)
- Duel Masters (2004 – 2006)
- The Dukes
- Dumb and Dumber (1998 – 2000)
- Dynomutt, Dog Wonder (1994 – 1999)
- Ed, Edd n Eddy (15 March 1999 – 25 December 2016)
- Elliott from Earth (6 March 2021 – 3 July 2022)
- Evil Con Carne (June 2002 – 2008)
- Fabulous Funnies
- Fangface (1993 – 1999)
- The Fantastic Four (1967) (1993 – 1998)
- The Fantastic Four (1978) (1994 – 1998)
- Fantastic Four: World's Greatest Heroes (2007 – 2013)
- Fantastic Voyage (1993 – 1997)
- Fat Albert and the Cosby Kids (1993 – 1997)
- Fat Dog Mendoza (27 February 2000 – 2006)
- Flintstone Frolics (1994 – 2000)
- The Flintstone Kids
- The Flintstones
- Fly Tales (2000 – 2004)
- Flying Rhino Junior High (2000 – 2004)
- Foofur (1993 – 1998)
- Foster's Home for Imaginary Friends (30 October 2004 – 2015)
- Frankenstein Jr. and The Impossibles (1995 – 1998)
- The Frankenstones
- Freakazoid! (1999 – 2002)
- The Fruitties
- The Fungies! (2 November 2020 – 3 July 2022)
- The Funky Phantom (1993 – 2000)
- Funnybones (1996 – 1997)
- Gadget Boy & Heather (2003 – 2009)
- Galaxy Goof-Ups (1993 – 1999)
- Galtar and the Golden Lance (1994 – 1997)
- Garfield and Friends (1994 – 2000)
- The Gary Coleman Show
- Generator Rex (25 October 2010 – 2012)
- Ghostbusters (1997 – 1998)
- Gilligan's Planet (1993 – 1996)
- Godzilla (1998 – 2000)
- Goldie Gold and Action Jack (1993 – 1996)
- Goober and the Ghost Chasers (1993 – 1997)
- Gravedale High (1995 – 1999)
- The Great Grape Ape Show
- Green Lantern: The Animated Series (2013 – 2016)
- The Grim Adventures of Billy & Mandy (May 2003 – December 2016)
- Grim & Evil (21 September 2002 – 2006)
- Grizzy & the Lemmings (4 March 2024 – 27 February 2026)
- Groovie Goolies
- Gundam Wing (2000 – 2003)
- Happy Harmonies (1993 – 1997)
- Harlem Globetrotters (1994 – 1997)
- Harry Hill's Shark Infested Custard (Autumn 2011 – 2013)
- Harry Hill's TV Burp (Autumn 2011 – 2013)
- He-Man and the Masters of the Universe (October 2004 – 2006)
- Heathcliff (1994 – 1997)
- Help!... It's the Hair Bear Bunch! (1993 – 2001)
- The Herculoids
- Hero: 108 (2010 – July 2014)
- Hero Factory (2011 – 2012)
- Hero Inside (4 March 2024 – 2025)
- Heyyy, It's the King! (1997 – 1998)
- Hi Hi Puffy AmiYumi (27 May 2005 – 2008)
- The Hillbilly Bears
- Hokey Wolf (1993 – 1997)
- Home Movies (2000 – 2003)
- Hong Kong Phooey (1993 – 2000)
- Hot Wheels: AcceleRacers (November 12, 2005 – 2006)
- Hot Wheels Battle Force 5 (2010 – July 2011)
- Huckleberry Hound (1993 – 2000)
- I Am Weasel (21 April 1997 – 2008)
- I, Elvis Riboldi (19 April 2021 – 3 July 2022)
- IGPX (2006)
- Inch High, Private Eye (1993 – 1999)
- The Incredible Hulk
- It's the Wolf (1993 – 1997)
- Ivanhoe, The King's Knight (1993 – 1995)
- Jabberjaw (1993 – 2001)
- Jackson 5ive
- Jana of the Jungle (1996 – 1999)
- Jeannie (1994 – 1995)
- The Jetsons
- Johnny Bravo (1997 – December 2013)
- Johnny Test (12 January 2006 – May–July 2017)
- Jonny Quest (1993 – 1997)
- Josie and the Pussycats (1993 – 1997)
- Josie and the Pussycats in Outer Space (1996 – 1998)
- Journey to the Center of the Earth (1995)
- Justice League (2002 – February 2005)
- Justice League Action (26 November 2016 – 2019)
- Justice League Unlimited (2005 – 2006)
- The Kid Super Power Hour with Shazam!
- Kong: The Animated Series (2005)
- Krypto the Superdog (2006 – 2008)
- The Kwicky Koala Show
- Laff-A-Lympics (1993 – 2000)
- Lassie's Rescue Rangers (1997 – 1998)
- Laurel and Hardy (1994)
- Laverne and Shirley in the Army
- Legends of Spark
- Legion of Super Heroes (5 March 2007 – October 2008)
- Lego Dreamzzz (5 August 2024 – 2025)
- Level Up (9 March 2013 – 2014)
- The Life and Times of Juniper Lee (20 August 2005 – 2008)
- Lippy the Lion and Hardy Har Har
- Little Dracula
- The Little Rascals
- Long Live the Royals (2016 – 2018; 6 May 2023)
- Loonatics Unleashed (22 April 2006 – 23 May 2007)
- Looney Tunes/Merrie Melodies (1993 – 2003)
- Loopy De Loop
- Lucas the Spider
- Lucky Luke
- The Magic Roundabout
- The Magilla Gorilla Show
- Make, Shake & Jake
- Mao Mao: Heroes of Pure Heart (2 March 2020 – 30 June 2021)
- The Marvel Super Heroes
- The Marvelous Misadventures of Flapjack (2009 – 2013)
- Masha and the Bear
- The Heroic Quest of the Valiant Prince Ivandoe (13 May 2023 - 1 February 2026)
- The Mask: Animated Series
- Medabots (2001 - 2006)
- Megas XLR (2005 – 2008)
- Mighty Magiswords (2017 – 2019)
- Mighty Man and Yukk
- Mighty Mightor
- Mighty Orbots
- Mike, Lu & Og (5 July 2000 – 2006; 2008)
- Mission: Magic!
- Mister T
- Mixels (21 May 2014 – January 2015)
- Moby Dick
- Monchichis
- Monster Allergy (17 May 2008)
- Monster Beach (5 July 2021 – 3 July 2022)
- The Moomins
- Motormouse and Autocat
- The Moxy Show
- ¡Mucha Lucha! (3 February 2003 – 2006)
- The Mumbly Cartoon Show
- My Favorite Martians (1995 – 1998)
- My Gym Partner's a Monkey (2006 – 2011)
- Ned's Newt (2000 – December 2006)
- The New Adventures of Batman
- The New Adventures of Captain Planet
- The New Adventures of Flash Gordon
- The New Adventures of Gilligan
- The New Adventures of He-Man
- The New Adventures of Huckleberry Finn
- The New Adventures of Superman
- The New Adventures of Zorro
- The New Batman Adventures
- The New Batman/Superman Adventures (22 February 1999 – 2000)
- The New Fred and Barney Show
- The New Scooby and Scrappy-Doo Show
- The New Scooby-Doo Movies
- The New Scooby-Doo Mysteries
- The New Shmoo
- The New Yogi Bear Show
- Nexo Knights (2016 – 2018)
- OK K.O.! Let's Be Heroes (October 2017 – 2020)
- Omer and the Starchild (1996 – 2001)
- One Piece (May 2005 – 23 May 2007)
- Outlaw Star (2001 – 2004)
- Over the Garden Wall (2015 – 2016)
- Ozzy & Drix (2003 – 2005)
- Pac-Man
- Partridge Family 2200 A.D.
- Paul in Fantasy Land
- Paw Paws
- The Pebbles and Bamm-Bamm Show
- The Perils of Penelope Pitstop
- Pet Alien (15 January 2005 – 2006)
- Peter Potamus
- The Pink Panther (1995 – 2001)
- The Pink Panther Show
- Pink Panther and Sons
- Pinky and the Brain
- Pinky, Elmyra & the Brain
- The Pirates of Dark Water
- Pixie and Dixie and Mr. Jinks
- Plastic Man
- The Plucky Duck Show
- Pokémon (October 2005 – 2008)
- Popeye
- Popeye and Son
- The Porky Pig Show
- Potsworth & Co.
- Pound Puppies
- Power Players (3 February 2020 – 17 July 2022)
- The Powerpuff Girls (1998) (1999 – 2012)
- The Powerpuff Girls (2016) (4 April 2016 - 2026)
- Punkin' Puss & Mushmouse
- A Pup Named Scooby-Doo (1997 – 2003)
- Quick Draw McGraw
- The Raccoons (1995 – 2001)
- Rave Master (February 2005 – 24 April 2006)
- The Real Adventures of Jonny Quest (1996 – 2000; 2003 – 2004)
- The Real Story of... (1997 – 1998)
- ReBoot (1997 – 2001)
- Redakai: Conquer the Kairu (March 2012)
- Richie Rich
- Rickety Rocket
- Ricochet Rabbit & Droop-a-Long
- Road Rovers (1999 – 2001)
- The Road Runner Show
- Robotboy (1 November 2005; last broadcast 21 July 2017)
- The Roman Holidays
- The Ruff and Reddy Show
- Samurai Jack (2001 – 1 April 2014)
- Scooby-Doo and Guess Who?
- Scooby-Doo! Mystery Incorporated (February 2011 – 2012)
- Scooby-Doo and Scrappy-Doo (1979)
- Scooby-Doo and Scrappy-Doo (1980) (1997 – 2008)
- The Scooby-Doo Show
- Scooby-Doo, Where Are You!
- Screwball Squirrel
- Sealab 2020 (2001 – 2004)
- The Secret Saturdays (2009)
- Secret Squirrel
- Shaggy & Scooby-Doo Get a Clue! (2007)
- Sharky & George (1996 – 2000)
- Shazzan
- She-Ra: Princess of Power
- Sheep in the Big City (4 May 2001 – 2006)
- Shirt Tales
- Sinbad Jr. and His Magic Belt
- Sitting Ducks (October 2005)
- The Skatebirds (1996 – 1997)
- Skatoony (2006 – 18 July 2019)
- Sky Commanders
- The Smurfs
- Snagglepuss
- Snooper and Blabber
- Snorks
- Space Ghost
- Space Ghost Coast to Coast (1996 – 2004)
- The Space Kidettes
- Space Stars
- Spaced Out (19 November 2001 – 2004)
- Spartakus and the Sun Beneath the Sea
- Speed Buggy
- Speed Racer
- Speed Racer X
- Spider-Man (1967) (1995 – 1997)
- Spider-Man (1981) (1995 – 1998)
- Spider-Man and His Amazing Friends
- Squiddly Diddly
- Squirrel Boy (2007 – 2009; 2012)
- Star Wars: Clone Wars (2004 – 2006)
- Star Wars: The Clone Wars (14 February 2009 – 2013)
- Static Shock (2005 – 2006)
- Steven Universe Future (23 December 2019 – 30 June 2021)
- Steven Universe (6 May 2014 - 2020)
- Storm Hawks (6 August 2007 – 2009)
- Street Fighter
- Street Fighter II V
- Summer Camp Island (4 March 2019 - 2024)
- Super Friends (1973)
- Super Friends (1980)
- Super Friends: The Legendary Super Powers Show
- The Super Globetrotters
- The Super Powers Team: Galactic Guardians
- Superman (1997 – 1998)
- Superman: The Animated Series (1998 – 2000)
- Supernoobs (November 2015 – 17 July 2019)
- SWAT Kats: The Radical Squadron (1996 – 2001)
- Sym-Bionic Titan (March 2012)
- Tabaluga (first broadcast 7 September 1998 – 2002)
- Tarzan, Lord of the Jungle
- Taz-Mania (1997–1999)
- Teen Titans (2005 – September 2008)
- Tenchi Muyo! (5 February 2001 – 7 September 2003)
- These Are the Days
- The Three Musketeers
- Thomas & Friends (1994 – 2001)
- Thundarr the Barbarian
- Thunderbirds (now on Talking Pictures)
- ThunderCats (1985)
- ThunderCats (2011) (10 September 2011 – 2013)
- ThunderCats Roar (6 April 2020 – 2021)
- The Tidings
- Time Squad (August 2002 – 2008)
- Tiny Toon Adventures
- Tom and Jerry (1993 – 2003)
- Tom & Jerry Kids (1995 – 2002)
- The Tom and Jerry Show (2014 – 2016)
- Totally Spies! (4 November 2024 – 2026)
- ToonHeads
- Top Cat
- A Touch of Blue on the Stars (1996 – 1998)
- Touché Turtle and Dum Dum
- The Transformers
- Transformers: Cybertron (2005 – 2006)
- Transformers: Cyberverse (2018 – 2020)
- Transformers: Prime (2011 – December 2015)
- Transformers: Robots in Disguise (16 February 2015 – 2018)
- Trollkins (1993 – 1997)
- Turbo Teen (1996)
- Undercover Elephant
- Underdog
- Uncle Grandpa (1 April 2014 - 2020)
- Unikitty! (5 March 2018 - 2023)
- Valley of the Dinosaurs
- VBirds (April 2003 – 2004)
- Victor and Valentino (26 August 2019 – 2022)
- Wacky Races (2018)
- Wait Till Your Father Gets Home
- Wally Gator
- We Bare Bears (7 September 2015 – 26 January 2026)
- We Baby Bears (4 April 2022 – 1 February 2026)
- Waynehead (1998 – 2000)
- What a Cartoon! (1996 – 2000)
- Whatever Happened to... Robot Jones? (5 January 2004 – 2008)
- What's New, Scooby-Doo? (11 April 2005 – 31 October 2022)
- Wheelie and the Chopper Bunch
- Wildfire (1996 – 1998)
- Winsome Witch
- Wishfart (2018)
- The World's Greatest SuperFriends
- X-Men: Evolution (2001 – 2004)
- Xiaolin Chronicles (2014 – 2016)
- Xiaolin Showdown (2004 – 2006)
- Yakky Doodle
- Yippee, Yappee and Yahooey
- Yo Yogi!
- Yogi Bear
- Yogi's Gang
- Yogi's Space Race
- Yogi's Treasure Hunt
- Yo-kai Watch (2016 – 2017)
- Young Justice (February 2013 – 2015)
- Young Robin Hood
- Yu-Gi-Oh! Zexal (June 2013 – 2014)
- The Zeta Project (2002 – 2004)

=== Cartoonito Programs ===
- Batwheels (5 June 2023 - 2026)
- Bugs Bunny Builders (2 November 2022 - 2025)
- Fireman Sam (1 March 2022 - 2026)

== Movies ==
- A Boy Named Charlie Brown
- The BFG (2000 - 2004)
- All Dogs Go to Heaven
- An All Dogs Christmas Carol
- Bartok the Magnificent
- Bon Voyage, Charlie Brown (and Don't Come Back!!)
- Casper
- Casper: A Spirited Beginning
- Casper Meets Wendy
- Casper Scare School
- Cats & Dogs
- Cats Don't Dance
- Chitty Chitty Bang Bang
- The Fearless Four
- FernGully: The Last Rainforest
- FernGully 2: The Magical Rescue
- The Flight of Dragons
- The Flintstones
- The Flintstones in Viva Rock Vegas
- Gay Purr-ee (2000 - 2003)
- The Goonies
- Journey Back to Oz
- The Land Before Time (2000 - 2006)
- Madeline
- Matilda
- Millionaire Dogs
- Once Upon a Forest
- Osmosis Jones
- The Pagemaster
- The Pebble and the Penguin
- The Phantom Tollbooth
- Pinocchio 3000
- Popeye's Voyage: The Quest for Pappy
- Race for Your Life, Charlie Brown
- Regular Show: The Movie
- Rover Dangerfield (2000 - 2004)
- The Secret of NIMH
- The Secret of NIMH 2: Timmy to the Rescue
- Snoopy Come Home
- Stanley's Magic Garden
- The Swan Princess
- The Swan Princess II: Escape from Castle Mountain
- The Swan Princess III: The Mystery of the Enchanted Kingdom
- Tom Sawyer
- The Trumpet of the Swan
- Willy Wonka & the Chocolate Factory
- The Wind in the Willows

== See also ==
- List of programs broadcast by Cartoon Network (United States)
- List of programs broadcast by Boomerang in the UK
