= Boomerang (Italian TV channel) =

Italian TV channel

- Country: Italy
- Broadcast area: Italy; San Marino; Vatican City; Switzerland; Malta

Programming
- Language: Italian

Ownership
- Parent: Warner Bros. Discovery EMEA
- Sister channels: Boing; Cartoon Network; Cartoonito; Frisbee; K2

History
- Launched: 31 July 2003; 23 years ago Timeshift service Boomerang+1 (2007-2026)

Links
- Website: "Boomerang" https://web.archive.org/web/20100704020427//http:Www.boomerangtv.it/

Availability

Streaming media
- Sky Italia: Sky Go

Boomerang is an Italian pay television television channel launched in 2003, which airs mostly modern cartoons aimed at preschoolers. It is a sister service of Cartoon Network, and is owned Skydance Corporation under its International division of the eponymous American cable television channel.

For the most part, the network's schedule matches that of the main Boomerang in the United Kingdom and Ireland, with local scheduling variations and the dubbing/subtitling of programmes into Italian.

== History ==
The channel launched exclusively on Sky Italia at its launch on 31 July 2003, airing the classic Hanna-Barbera cartoons such as Courage the Cowardly Dog, Johnny Bravo, The Flintstones and many other classics, taken directly from the Cartoon Network schedule.

From 22 October 2007 on channel 618 of Sky, along with Cartoon Network, the channel Boomerang +1 launched, airing the same schedule as Boomerang just one hour behind.

From 20 December 2013 due to frequency changes, the channel began to air in the 14:9 ratio, and from 16 September 2015 along with the original feed it switched to 16:9.

Since 2 February 2015, the channel has been rebranding the network, adopting the new logo. and the new graphics, concurrently with international versions, of the channel.

Since 16 September 2015, the original version of the channel has been broadcast in 16:9 wide format.

In March 2020, the Italian version of Boomerang was added to UPC in Switzerland.

From 1 December 2023, the channel transmits, in high definition on the streaming platform NOW and on Sky Stream and Sky Glass decoders, while remaining in standard definition on Sky Italia's satellite platform on channel 609.

In November 2025, it was announced that, as part of Sky Italia not renewing its carriage deal with Warner Bros. Discovery, Cartoon Network and Boomerang would shut down on 1 January 2026. On 13 December, it was announced that Sky had entered into a last-minute recarriage agreement with Warner Bros. Discovery, allowing both channels to remain broadcasting.

== Boomerang +1 ==
Boomerang +1 was a timeshift channel launched on 22 October 2007 that aired the same schedule as Boomerang, just one hour behind. The channel also usually temporarily rebranded to special programmes dedicated to classic shows. It closed on 1 January 2026.

== Logos ==
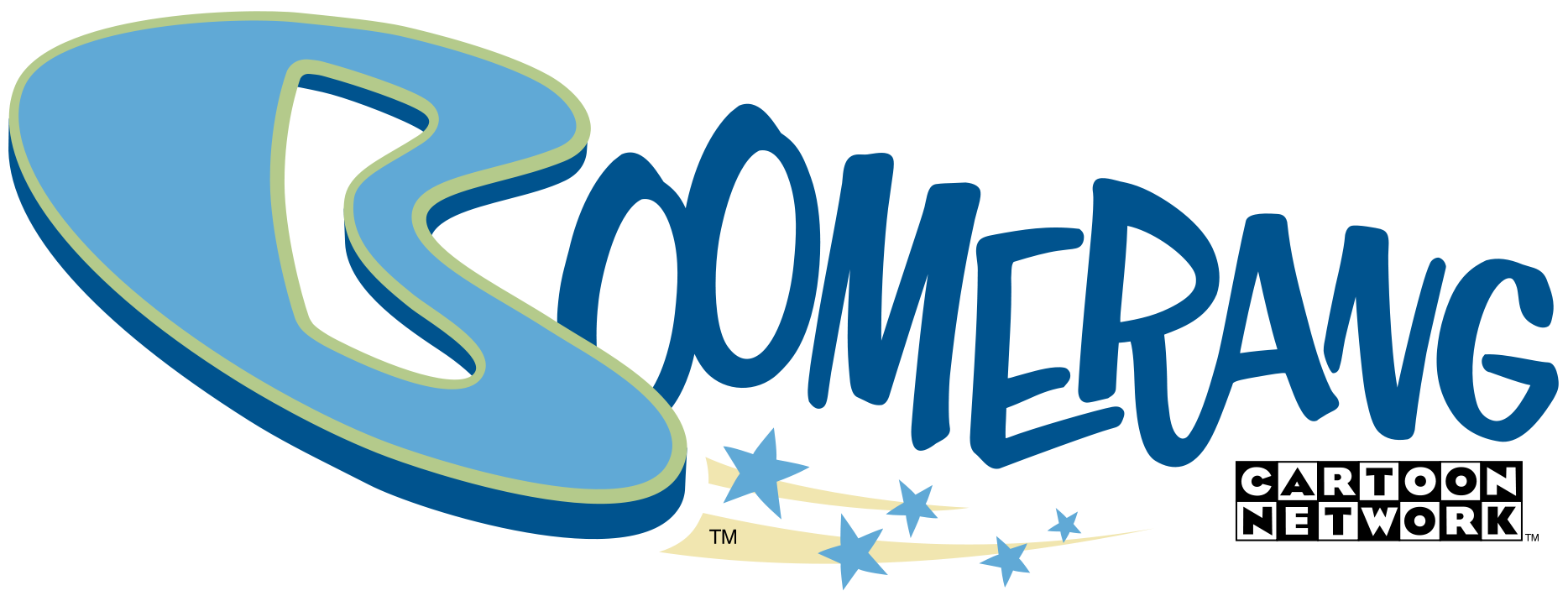
31 July 2003 – 4 April 2005

5 April 2005 – 2 February 2015

3 February 2015 - present
