= Welcome to Earth =

Welcome to Earth may refer to:

- Welcome to Earth (album), a 2000 album by Apoptygma Berzerk
- "Welcome to Earth" (song), a 2018 song by Delta Goodrem
- Welcome to Earth (TV program), a 2021 American documentary series with Will Smith
- Welcome to Earth (2022 TV series), an animated programme broadcast by Cartoon Network (UK and Ireland)
- "Welcome to Earth" (Supergirl), a 2016 TV episode

== See also ==
- "Welcome to Earth-2", a 2016 episode of The Flash
- Welcome to Planet Earth, alternate title of the television film Alien Avengers
