= List of Nexo Knights episodes =

This page lists the known episodes of Nexo Knights.

== Series overview ==
| Season | Subtitle | Episodes | Originally released | |
| Season | Subtitle | Episodes | First released | Last released |
|---|---|---|---|---|
| 1 | The Book of Monsters | 10 | December 13, 2015 | March 24, 2016 |
| 2 | Books of Power | 10 | July 24, 2016 | October 22, 2016 |
| 3 | Storm Over Knighton | 10 | February 4, 2017 | April 8, 2017 |
| 4 | Hard and Heavy | 10 | August 21, 2017 | September 1, 2017 |

== Episodes ==
=== Season 1: The Book of Monsters (2015–16) ===
| No. overall | No. in season | Title | Directed by | Written by | Story by | Original release date | U.S. viewers (in millions) |
|---|---|---|---|---|---|---|---|
| 1 | 1 | "The Book of Monsters – Part 1" | Stu Gamble | Mark Hoffmeier | Tommy Andreasen, Thomas Sebastian Fenger & Mark Hoffmeier | December 13, 2015 | 0.92 |
When Jestro the jester finds the Book of Monsters, chaos breaks loose in the Kingdom of Knighton.
| 2 | 2 | "The Book of Monsters – Part 2" | Jerry Forder | Mark Hoffmeier | Tommy Andreasen, Thomas Sebastian Fenger & Mark Hoffmeier | December 13, 2015 | 0.79 |
Realizing that they must defend Knighton from Jestro's Lava Monsters, the knights are despondent when they discover that their advisor, Merlok the Magician sacrificed himself.
| 3 | 3 | "The Power of Merlok" | Stu Gamble | Ernie Altbacker | Tommy Andreasen, Thomas Sebastian Fenger & Mark Hoffmeier | January 13, 2016 | 0.87 |
When Jestro attacks a village, the knights wonder how they will get there. Macy remembers that her father, King Halbert has an RV that can be modded for their own "knightly" use.
| 4 | 4 | "The Knight's Code" | Jerry Forder | Andrew Robinson | Tommy Andreasen, Thomas Sebastian Fenger & Mark Hoffmeier | January 14, 2016 | 0.79 |
Jestro and the Book of Monsters find the Book of Chaos. Jestro uses the chaotic Lava Monsters to attack King Halbert and his wife, Queen Halbert who are on a business-related tour of Knighton.
| 5 | 5 | "Fright Knight" | Stu Gamble | John Derevlany | Tommy Andreasen, Thomas Sebastian Fenger & Mark Hoffmeier | January 15, 2016 | 0.89 |
Jestro and the Book of Monsters find the Book of Fear. Eating it lets the Book of Monsters summon Spider-Globlins and Whiparella, a Lava Monster who can bring fears to life. One by one, the knights' fears are brought to life except for Aaron.
| 6 | 6 | "The Golden Castle" | Jerry Forder | Ernie Altbacker | Tommy Andreasen, Thomas Sebastian Fenger & Mark Hoffmeier | March 3, 2016 | 0.87 |
Lance earns the leading role in a re-imagining of 'The Golden Castle' and his friends play in the background. Macy does not like it one bit because the original film has everything that she believes in but the re-imagining does not. When they're filming, Jestro summons Lavaria, a very sneaky Lava Monster. Jestro orders Lavaria to get the script for the Book of Monsters.
| 7 | 7 | "The Maze of Amazement" | Stu Gamble & Jean Paul Vermeulen | Andrew Robinson | Tommy Andreasen, Thomas Sebastian Fenger & Mark Hoffmeier | March 10, 2016 | 0.97 |
The knights go to Axl's hometown of Diggington where they meet his mother, father and younger sister, Axlina. They leave to find the Book of Deception in a maze that does not look like what it seems. They discover that Jestro and the Book of Monsters are searching for the book too, becoming a race for the book.
| 8 | 8 | "The Black Knight" | Jerry Forder | John Derevlany | Tommy Andreasen, Thomas Sebastian Fenger & Mark Hoffmeier | March 17, 2016 | 1.15 |
After getting away with the real Book of Deception, Jestro feeds it to the Book of Monsters to create fake NEXO Knights. The fake knights raid the village of Bork, framing the real knights. When the real knights arrive, the citizens shoo them off. A giant mech suit in black appears to defend Knighton’s villages.
| 9 | 9 | "The Book of Total Badness" | Stu Gamble & Jean Paul Vermeulen | Mark Hoffmeier | Tommy Andreasen, Thomas Sebastian Fenger & Mark Hoffmeier | March 24, 2016 | 1.13 |
Jestro and the Book of Monsters travel to the place where the evil wizard Monstrox did his evil deeds and find the Book of Destruction. Soon, Jestro brings out many destructive monsters including the Lava Monster Infernox and splits them up in different directions. Macy scolded to her father that she quits being a princess, but he disagrees and that she was born to be a princess. When the knights find out that monsters are attacking, Merlok 2.0 told them that they should go together, but they decided to split up; King Halbert hopes his daughter will come back. However, the knights get captured one by one, with no way to escape. When all the monsters were asleep, Aaron quietly escapes, being the only knight to save all his friends before Jestro attacks the castle of Knightonia. As Jestro's forces close in on Knightonia, the Book of Monsters sends Beast Master to find a specific book that would increase his abilities.
| 10 | 10 | "The Might and the Magic" | Jerry Forder | Mark Hoffmeier | Tommy Andreasen, Thomas Sebastian Fenger & Mark Hoffmeier | March 24, 2016 | 1.07 |
Aaron must figure out a plan to save all his friends. When Jestro was doubting his desire to destroy King Halbert, Beast Master feeds the Book of Revenge to the Book of Monsters where it increases the revenge motivation in Jestro and the Lava Monster Army. Meanwhile, Macy has a flashback, saying that she wanted to become a knight, not being a princess all the time. Soon, she admitted to herself that she was not ready to be a knight, but was cut off by Aaron, who used his energy bow to cut the chain off of her, and retained her shield and mace back. The two then rescued Clay, who was chained on a target, getting spun around all the time. After him, they saved Axl by giving him a chain of sausages to climb up, but were unsuccessful the first time, and the second time, they succeeded. Finally, they rescue Lance, who was stuck in an animal farm, making a new friend, called Hamletta, a pig. Jestro, who was so close to victory, was stopped by the knights, and the rest of the knights and Clay, got their NEXO Power, and as the blue knight got one that was last done ages ago. When Clay got the new NEXO Power, one smash of his sword and all the monsters turned to purple dust, and he slammed his sword down again, and sent Jestro all the way out of the kingdom of Knightonia. Near the end, King Halbert apologizes to Macy, and he proclaims her an official NEXO Knight. Lance then gets Dennis back on one condition: Lance has to be Dennis' servant once a week.

=== Season 2: Books of Power (2016) ===
| No. overall | No. in season | Title | Directed by | Written by | Story by | Original release date | U.S. viewers (in millions) |
|---|---|---|---|---|---|---|---|
| 11 | 1 | "Back to School" | Stu Gamble & Jean Paul Vermeulen | Mark Hoffmeier | Tommy Andreasen, Thomas Sebastian Fenger & Mark Hoffmeier | July 24, 2016 | 0.86 |
The Nexo Knights return to the Knights Academy partly to get re-educated under the headmaster Sir Brickland and partly because Jestro and the Book of Monsters are after another spellbook that is located there. The education does not go easily for the Nexo Knights, they leap at the opportunity when Jestro and the Book of Monsters unleash the Lava Monsters on the Knights Academy. Although the Nexo Knights were successful at preventing Jestro and the Book of Monsters from stealing the spellbook, Jestro managed to steal a snowglobe that Merlok gave to Sir Brickland for safekeeping. When Jestro breaks the snow globe, it turned out to contain a monster castle that Merlok had shrunk and sealed away many years ago.
| 12 | 2 | "Greed is Good?" | Jerry Forder | Mark Hoffmeier | Tommy Andreasen, Thomas Sebastian Fenger & Mark Hoffmeier | August 13, 2016 | 0.86 |
The Nexo Knights attend Lance’s parents’ Gold is Good Ball in Lance’s hometown of Auremville. Jestro and the Book of Monsters find the Book of Greed. Eating it summons Monstrox’s right-hand man, General Magmar and makes the Lava Monsters so greedy, that they steal all of the Richmond's riches along with Lance's parents.
| 13 | 3 | "The Book of Obsession" | Stu Gamble & Jean Paul Vermeulen | Ernie Altbacker | Tommy Andreasen, Thomas Sebastian Fenger & Mark Hoffmeier | August 13, 2016 | 0.86 |
The Book of Monsters plans to consume a limited edition copy of a Ned Knightley comic book, which will guarded by the Nexo Knights until it is won at a costume contest at Knight-A-Con (this show's parody of San Diego Comic Con). Robin is also attending the convention using his newly designed Mini-trex (a miniature version of the Fortrex). When General Magmar gets impatient with Jestro's plan to blend in with the attendees, he launches an all out attack on Knight-A-Con which causes the comic book to get lost in a crowd of terrorized attendees. Fortunately, the Mini-trex is able to extend the range of the Nexo Knights' connection to Merlok 2.0, allowing them to obtain their Nexo Powers and find the book. Because of this, Robin wins first prize at the costume contest and thus, he and the Nexo Knights get to keep the comic.
| 14 | 4 | "The King's Tournament" | Jerry Forder | John Derevlany | Tommy Andreasen, Thomas Sebastian Fenger & Mark Hoffmeier | September 10, 2016 | 0.55 |
On King Halbert's birthday, Jorah Tightwad decides to prove that the Tighty Knighties are better than the Nexo Knights at King Halbert's birthday tournament, using the Book of Envy as proof that they encountered Jestro. If the Tighty Knighties win, Macy has to kiss Tightwad. If they lose, Jorah has to kiss Lance's "sweetheart." The next day, the tournament is held to see who are the best group of knights in Knightonia. All four Tighty Knighties best the Nexo Knights in the tournament except Macy who is forced to be her father's princess for the day and thus is forbidden to compete. King Halbert seemed like he didn't want to say the tournament was over. Suddenly, Jestro and the Book of Monsters lead the Lava Monster Army into attacking the birthday tournament. The Tighty Knighties are then shown being completely useless at fighting them and cowering in fear. At that moment, Tightwad reveals the truth of how he obtained the Book of Envy where it fell into his hands when Merlok scattered the evil spell books in the first episode. This distracts him long enough for Jestro to take the book from him. After powering up and defeating the Lava Monster Army, the Nexo Knights are declared the true winners of the tournament, and Jorah tried to argue that it was no fair, since everyone saw that his knights were superior, but the Tighty Knighties explain that they're good in shows and sports, but when it comes to fighting monsters, they can't compete. So Tightwad is forced to kiss Lance's "sweetheart" on the lips. This turns out to be Hamletta much to Tightwad's horror. King Halbert is proud of what Macy did today, saying there's a time for her to be a princess and a time for when she needs to be a knight. Meanwhile, Jestro and the Book of Monsters have succeeded in stealing the Book of Envy which is soon consumed by the Book of Monsters. In the credits, with the regular music, Tightwad is heard screaming and yelling that he doesn't want to kiss Hamletta again.
| 15 | 5 | "Monster Chef" | Jean Paul Vermeulen | David McDermott | Tommy Andreasen, Thomas Sebastian Fenger & Mark Hoffmeier | September 17, 2016 | 0.76 |
The famed Knighton Chef Gobbleton Rambley has created a chili recipe so spicy, the Book of Monsters gains the idea to weaponize it. Knowing this, Clay has Axl and Chef Éclair compete in a cook off with the grand prize being the one cookbook which contains Rambley's chili recipe. When Jestro sends Moltor and Lavaria undercover to compete in the same contest, Éclair has the Nexo Knights seek a pepper so spicy, it explodes if mishandled. Meanwhile, Lance and Aaron hold their own contest to determine which of them is the most resistant to spicy peppers, but Merlok 2.0 doesn't like this idea. Despite Jestro's efforts, the Nexo Knights succeed in getting the pepper they need and use it to win the cook off. But unfortunately, their chili ends up being so spicy, it burns the grand prize to oblivion once it was spilled. Luckily, Chef Rambley confesses that he never liked spicy peppers and chili anyway. Lance and Aaron needed to eat the final pepper in their contest, but Merlok takes it away and tries to "dispose" it. But he drops it and the pepper explodes.
| 16 | 6 | "Knight Out" | Jerry Forder | Ernie Altbacker | Tommy Andreasen, Thomas Sebastian Fenger & Mark Hoffmeier | September 24, 2016 | 0.74 |
The Nexo Knights send Clay on vacation to get some free time, unaware that Jestro and the Book of Monsters are on the trail of another evil spell book that is near where Clay is staying on his vacation. Clay soon discovers the staff of his vacation spot has been extremely rude, cruel and nasty to him (doing things such as serving him moldy food and forcing him to tip them for everything) courtesy of the Book of Cruelty. Meanwhile, the Nexo Knights are having fun. Problems arise, such as Merlok glitching, no food, and plumbing problems because they started neglecting their daily duties and they rush to retrieve Clay. Despite his efforts, Clay is captured by Jestro and the Book of Cruelty is fed to the Book of Monsters which gives the Book of Monsters the ability to summon the Lava Monsters Crust Smasher and Flame Thrower. Fortunately, the other Knights arrive and save Clay and Jestro's forces retreat. To the misfortune of the Knights, Clay learns the importance of relaxing just as they had become more diligent.
| 17 | 7 | "Saturday Knight Fever" | Jean Paul Vermeulen | Mark Hoffmeier | Tommy Andreasen, Thomas Sebastian Fenger & Mark Hoffmeier | October 1, 2016 | 0.67 |
During a dinner party that the Nexo Knights attend in the town of Cleanington, the Book of Monsters goes to Snottingham (the coldest place in all of Knighton) to consume the literally sickening Snotheiser which makes him and the Lava Monsters he summons very unhealthy. When the Nexo Knights rush to stop the attack on Snottingham, the Lava Monsters sneeze all over them causing them to wake up the next day with the Snottingham Flu (a version of the flu that causes bizarre effects on the victim in addition to usual flu symptoms) causing Clay to hallucinate, Macy to experience severe pins and needles, Aaron to become dizzy and uncoordinated, and Axl to be robbed of his hunger and appetite, and Lance doesn't seem to have any visible symptoms, though he does say that his hair lost his luster. The Book of Monsters, on the other hand, makes a full recovery. Just before Jestro and the Book of Monsters are able to kidnap King and Queen Halbert, Merlok and Ava send a Nexo Power with an antivirus system added to it which cures the knights of their sickness and allows them to defeat Jestro and the Book of Monsters.
| 18 | 8 | "Open Mike Knight" | Jerry Forder | John Derevlany | Tommy Andreasen, Thomas Sebastian Fenger & Mark Hoffmeier | October 8, 2016 | 0.65 |
Inspired by Jestro's idol Jokes Knightley, Jestro and the Book of Monsters attend a gig in the village of Funnyton where they pose as comedians. The Nexo Knights also attend and to their surprise, they actually find Jestro hilarious, even attempting to convince Jestro to change his evil ways. However, Jokes Knightley kidnaps the Book of Monsters in order to steal Jestro's act, courtesy of the last evil spellbook called the Book of Betrayal. When the Nexo Knights find the Book of Monsters, it becomes a mad battle for the Book of Betrayal which eventually falls into the hands of Jestro. Not knowing what to do, Jestro runs into the woods and hands the Book of Betrayal to an unseen individual. Evil laughter is soon heard afterwards.
| 19 | 9 | "The Fortrex and the Furious" | Dipan Gajjar | Mark Hoffmeier | Tommy Andreasen, Thomas Sebastian Fenger & Mark Hoffmeier | October 15, 2016 | 0.66 |
Recapping from the previous episode, the figure who Jestro gave the Book of Betrayal to is revealed to be Clay, who takes Jestro to the Fortrex. When the Book of Monsters attempts to gain the Book of Betrayal and Jestro, the Nexo Knights split up as a diversion until Clay is cornered. Now fully reformed, Jestro sacrifices himself so Clay can escape with the Book of Betrayal. The Nexo Knights then stage a rescue mission to save Jestro from the volcano lair where the Book of Monsters reveals that he is actually the dark necromancer Monstrox, whom Merlok turned into a book and divided his power among eleven other spellbooks. Monstrox adds that he needs Jestro as a host body to regain human form through a ritual in the "Dark Arena", waiting for the Book of Betrayal to corrupt the Nexo Knights. Unfortunately, Clay appeared to have succumbed to its power and begins to bring the Book of Betrayal to Monstrox.
| 20 | 10 | "Kingdom of Heroes" | Dipan Gajjar | Mark Hoffmeier | Tommy Andreasen, Thomas Sebastian Fenger & Mark Hoffmeier | October 22, 2016 | 0.61 |
Recapping from the previous episode, Clay hands The Book of Betrayal not because he was corrupted, but to exchange it for Jestro's freedom. Monstrox makes the deal and frees Jestro, but chains Clay in his place to take his body for his own. As part of the ritual, Monstrox regurgitates the evil spellbooks. Meanwhile, the other Knights follow Clay to the Book of Monsters' lair, but are overwhelmed by the Lava Monster Army and reluctantly follow Jestro through the death trap-filled backdoor entrance. Upon reaching Clay, the Book of Monsters nearly completes the ceremony, but Jestro and the Nexo Knights hold him off long enough for Robin to hand Clay Merlok and Techcaliber, which Clay feeds to Monstrox. Overwhelmed by Merlok 2.0's power, Monstrox explodes into energy, destroying his book body while curing Jestro of the Book of Evil's effects. Merlok 2.0 is presumably destroyed as well, but when Robin replaces Techcaliber's motherboard, Merlok 2.0 is revealed to have survived. With Jestro also having been forgiven for his actions and reinstated as court jester, the Nexo Knights celebrate their victory with the rest of the kingdom. When Jestro looks at the sky, he sees Monstrox's face implying the necromancer's survival as a spirit.: Error: The Book of Revenge is often called the Book of Vengeance.

=== Season 3: Storm Over Knighton (2017) ===
| No. overall | No. in season | Title | Directed by | Written by | Story by | Original release date | U.S. viewers (in millions) |
|---|---|---|---|---|---|---|---|
| 21 | 1 | "The Cloud" | Alan Simpson | Mark Hoffmeier | Tommy Andreasen, Thomas Sebastian Finger, Mikkel Lee & Mark Hoffmeier | February 4, 2017 | 0.77 |
It has been months since the destruction of the Book of Monsters. The knights have made lives for themselves. Clay is a teacher at Knighton Academy, Lance is a host for the Knighton News Network, Aaron is a stunt performer and Axl is a TV chef. On Princess Macy's part, she has been unsuccessful at getting each of the towns to be more defensive from future monster attacks. But all is not well. A storm is brewing over Knighton as Jestro tries to make amends with the people he has wronged. Monstrox has taken the form of a storm cloud and once again takes control of Jestro by zapping him with his evil lightning. Arriving at a fortress in Ghoulia, the Cloud of Monstrox raises an army of lightning-infused Stone Monsters. His first target is the new Lavalands Amusement Center that was established by Mr. Richmond on the property of the Lava Monster Army's former base. When Lance is overwhelmed by the Stone Monster Army, Merlok summons the rest of the knights. Meanwhile, Jestro and the Cloud of Monstrox go under the amusement park. When Jestro finds Monstrox's former Book of Monsters body, the Cloud of Monstrox tells him to hold onto it as he has grown attached to it. Jestro then uncovers the staff that Monstrox used before he was split into different spellbooks.
| 22 | 2 | "A Little Rusty" | Jerry Forder | Mark Hoffmeier | Tommy Andreasen, Thomas Sebastian Finger, Mikkel Lee & Mark Hoffmeier | February 11, 2017 | 0.70 |
Recapping from the previous episode, the Nexo Knights arrive to assist Lance and return to their duties as knights. However, now that Jestro and the Cloud of Monstrox have the Staff of Monstrox, they head to the Iron Mountains where the Cloud of Monstrox awakens a Rogul that held a tablet containing the Forbidden Power of Relentless Rust (which rusts any metal that it touches) while infusing the guardian with the dark magic. During the Stone Monster Army's attack on Armourville, the Rogul starts rusting every statue it comes in contact with while the Cloud of Monstrox reanimates the statues there. The Knights arrive, but their armor and the Fortrex's treads are rusted by the Rogul and Jestro, with Clay's hand briefly turning to stone when he gets blasted by the Forbidden Power, and then crashes into a statue just as Monstrox zaps it. Luckily, Merlok has devised a way for the Nexo Knights to combine Nexo Powers, a strategy that makes them powerful enough to destroy the stone monsters and send them into the Cloud of Monstrox. After the retreat of Jestro and Monstrox, Robin gives the Nexo Knights new armor meant to be resistant to all of the Forbidden Powers. During a solo training session, while his cohorts are celebrating their victory, Clay privately confides to Merlok that his fighting skills seem to be deteriorating. When Merlok scans him, he realizes Clay has been cursed with dark, ancient magic and advises him not to tell the others.
| 23 | 3 | "Mount Thunderstrox" | Jean Paul Vermeulen | Ernie Altbacker | Tommy Andreasen, Thomas Sebastian Finger, Mikkel Lee & Mark Hoffmeier | February 18, 2017 | 0.69 |
After recovering his memories of the Forbidden Powers, Merlok 2.0 tells the Knights of their origins. The Forbidden Powers were dark destructive, spells that Monstrux created, and when insane casting. Merlok eventually defeated him, but the spells were too powerful to destroy. So, he sealed the Forbidden Powers away in stone tablets and created the Roguls to protect them. Meanwhile, Jestro and Monstrox recruit a minion, a sculptor named Roberto Arnoldi, to create stone monsters for Monstrox. After arriving on Mount Thunderstrux, Jestro transfers Relentless Rust into one of the Mountain's stone pillars. To test out Arnoldi's new monsters, Jestro and Monstrux attack a town, resulting in the knights tricking the Rogul into destroying Jestro's Evil Mobile. Meanwhile, Clay is beginning to turn to stone.
| 24 | 4 | "Rotten Luck" | Jerry Forder | John Derevlany | Tommy Andreasen, Thomas Sebastian Finger, Mikkel Lee & Mark Hoffmeier | February 25, 2017 | 0.76 |
Jestro and the Cloud of Monstrox enter a swamp where the Forbidden Power of Ravaging Rot (which causes organic matter to become rotten) was hidden in addition to reanimating the petrified forms of the three Harpies Hilda, Ingrid, and Bullwicker. Jestro instructs Roberto to build a new mobile headquarters for the Stone Monster Army after what happened to the Evil Mobile. Meanwhile, the Knights find out about Clay's "illness" and begin growing concerned. With their new Forbidden Power and the Rogul associated with it, Jestro and the Cloud of Monstrox begin rotting all the food and wood they can find much to Axl's dismay. The Nexo Knights (sans Clay) corner Jestro over a wooden bridge to the biggest Fruit dispensary in the kingdom while Ava is still having issues with calibrating a suitable Combo-Power. Just as Jestro uses the Forbidden Power to rot the bridge, Clay arrives in a new exo-suit designed by Robin to save them and turn the tide of the battle while Jestro's forces retreat in a new mobile headquarters designed by Arnoldi. Afterward, Jestro and Monstrox return to Mount Thunderstrox where they proceed to transfer Ravaging Rot into another one of the pillars.
| 25 | 5 | "Storm Over Rock Wood" | Jean Paul Vermeulen | David McDermott | Tommy Andreasen, Thomas Sebastian Finger, Mikkel Lee & Mark Hoffmeier | March 4, 2017 | 0.77 |
When several recent robberies in the forest of Rock Wood committed by the bandit Robot Hoodlum (who steals from the rich to give to poor neglected Squirebots) feature the Cloud of Monstrox in the background with the latest one being on Jorah Tightwad and the Tighty Knighties, the Knights believe that they are working together. And it turns out they are right. Jestro and the Cloud of Monstrox arrive in Rockwood Forest to get help from Robot Hoodlum. When Hoodlum refuses to cooperate, the Cloud of Monstrox uses his lightning to rig his programming so that he steals the Nexo Knights' shields much to the dismay of Hoodlum's biggest fan Dennis. The Knights enter Rockwood and with Dennis' help, they find the camp where Robot Hoodlum aids the neglected Squirebots.....and Jestro. Knowing that the knights are vulnerable, the Cloud of Monstrox animates every Grimroc in Rock Wood Forest that was previously turned to stone by Merlok back when they served Monstrox. However, since Clay is still in his exo-suit, he is able to acquire a combo power for himself that he uses to defeat most of the Grimrocs while the remaining Grimrocs retreat with Jestro and the Cloud of Monstrox. The Nexo Knights get their shields back. Robin repairs Robot Hoodlum and his Merry Mechs. Inspired by Clay's skills with the Combo Power, Robin builds exo-suits for the rest of the Nexo Knights. However, Clay continues to turn to stone and knows that a successor will soon be needed. After Robot Hoodlum gives Lance four robots to be his servants (each of which Lance names after Dennis), the original Dennis joins Hoodlum's Merry Mechs.
| 26 | 6 | "Miner Setback" | Jerry Forder | Jack Thomas | Tommy Andreasen, Thomas Sebastian Finger, Mikkel Lee & Mark Hoffmeier | March 11, 2017 | 0.65 |
Axlina summons Axl and the Nexo Knights when people in Diggington begin disappearing including Axl's parents. As it turns out, they are being kidnapped by General Garg and the Stone Monsters with him so that Jestro and the Cloud of Monstrox can use them to unearth the Three Brothers Roog, Reex, and Rumble whose petrified remains were hidden by the Wizards Council. The Nexo Knights use Aaron to spy on the Stone Army and quickly jump into action in their battle suits with Merlok 2.0 using the Fortrex to keep the Cloud of Monstrox out of the mine. Unfortunately, the Three Brothers are all unearthed with Roberto giving Rumble's disembodied head a car-like body and proving to be a match for the knights and the tunnel walls block the signal for the Nexo Knights. However, the camera Lance used to film Jurgen's reality show is able to extend the signal, and the Nexo Knights power up. The Cloud Monstrox was able to sneak into the mine through a canyon. Unfortunately for him, the walls absorb most of his moisture, reducing him in size and forcing the Stone Monster Army to retreat. The enslaved miners including Axl's parents are freed and the Cloud of Monstrox is forced to briefly use his book cover as a body until he accumulates enough moisture. Meanwhile, Clay continues to petrify and has already begun talking to his successor who is obscured from the viewer.
| 27 | 7 | "Knight at the Museum" | Jean Paul Vermeulen | John Derevlany | Tommy Andreasen, Thomas Sebastian Finger, Mikkel Lee & Mark Hoffmeier | March 18, 2017 | 0.66 |
Jestro and the Cloud of Monstrox attempt to sneak into the Knighton Art Museum which is displaying the Rogul containing the Forbidden Power of Collapsing Crumble (which has the ability to make any stone object crumble to dust). King Halbert is hosting an event at the Knighton Art Museum and the Nexo Knights are guarding. The Cloud of Monstrox instructs Jestro and Roberto to carefully chisel the tablet off the statue. However, Roberto Arnoldi's response to his artwork in the museum being treated as coat racks by the curator Edward Evanston blows their cover forcing the Cloud of Monstrox to bring every sculpture in the Museum to life including the Rogul. Out of fear, King Halbert puts the museum on lockdown, binding the museum in an indestructible metal plating which keeps the Cloud of Monstrox and the Stone Monster Army out, but leaves the Nexo Knights, King Halbert, Queen Halbert, and Edward Evanston trapped inside with the sculptures and Rogul with no way to acquire Nexo Powers. The Rogul of Relentless Rust attempts to rust the metal off. At the same time, Ava hacks the security measures to shut down the lockdown leaving only the stone walls to keep the building standing. After Jestro is given the Forbidden Power from the Rogul, he uses it to literally bring down the house and escape with the Power. Clay struggles to fight in the collapsing building and needs Macy to help him. Luckily, everyone makes it out of the museum alive, but half of Clay's body has already been petrified. Meanwhile, Jestro and the Cloud of Monstrox add Collapsing Crumble to the pillars on Mount Thunderstrox while Clay continues to give advice to his unseen successor.: NOTES: The title is a reference to the feature film.
| 28 | 8 | "Hot Rock Massage" | Jerry Forder | Ernie Altbacker | Tommy Andreasen, Thomas Sebastian Finger, Mikkel Lee & Mark Hoffmeier | March 25, 2017 | 0.63 |
Jestro and the Cloud of Monstrox lead the Stone Monster Army to the town of Burningham to find the Rogul that is associated with the Forbidden Power of Blazing Burn (which gives the user the ability to create and hurl deadly fireballs that can set anything on fire). To the Cloud of Monstrox's surprise, the inhabitants are all members of the Lava Monster Army who were left without a job after the destruction of their former base and found the Rogul, gaining hope that they could build a town around it. General Magmar is the mayor, Lavaria is a yoga teacher, Whiparella is a street artist, Bookkeeper is a glockenspiel performer, and Flama and Moltor work at the Hot Rock Cafe. The Cloud of Monstrox's attempt to get Sparks and Burnzie to give him the Rogul fails when General Magmar identifies him and doesn't want to work for him again. Upon being blown out of the village by Whiparella and telling this to Jestro, the evil jester asks why he didn't use his evil lightning on them. The Cloud of Monstrox stated that he didn't think it would be needed. When the Nexo Knights find out about this, they go to Burningham. The Lava Monsters, who have become pacifists as payment for their crimes, are taught how to fight again to protect their town from the Stone Monster Army. Roberto Arnoldi sculpts a flying part of the mobile headquarters for Jestro and the Cloud of Monstrox to use upon being inspired by the two of them calling each other an airhead. Although Jestro seems to have succeeded in stealing the Rogul, it was actually Beast Master being used as a decoy as Beast Master escapes. The real Rogul was taken to the Fortrex so that the Nexo Knights could study the Forbidden Powers. Ava figures that the information that Merlok 2.0 is looking for is in the Knighton Castle Library. As Clay and Merlok 2.0 continue to talk to the unidentified successor, the Lava Monsters are shown celebrating their victory as they begin to spar with one another.
| 29 | 9 | "Rock Bottom" | Jean Paul Vermeulen & Alan Simpson | Mark Hoffmeier | Tommy Andreasen, Thomas Sebastian Finger, Mikkel Lee & Mark Hoffmeier | April 8, 2017 | 0.60 |
Jestro and the Cloud of Monstrox animate the Stone Monster witch Ruina Stoneheart who they use to help the Harpies capture Queen Halbert during her visit to Hammerin. Despite resistance from Macy and the Mayor of Hammerin, Ruina and the Harpies succeed in their mission to capture Queen Halbert using Roberto's new Capture Cruiser. Upon hearing the word of this, King Halbert gives Macy a much-needed gift, a dragon-like vehicle designed by Robin known as "Hotspur." The Nexo Knights attempt to save Queen Halbert, but it turns out to be a diversion and the Stone Monster Army steals the Rogul containing the Forbidden Power of Blazing Burn and Techcalibur from the Fortrex while also dealing serious damage to it. Axl, Aaron, and Lance go after Jestro and the Rogul while Macy and Clay continue chasing after Ruina. Unfortunately, the Stone Monster Army escapes with the reanimated Rogul and the Forbidden Power of Blazing Burn. Although Queen Halbert is successfully rescued, Clay's transformation into stone has finally been completed. The knights decide not to tell King Halbert about this and mourn the loss of Clay with Merlok 2.0, Ava and Robin.
| 30 | 10 | "In Charge" | Jerry Forder | Mark Hoffmeier | Tommy Andreasen, Thomas Sebastian Finger, Mikkel Lee & Mark Hoffmeier | April 8, 2017 | 0.67 |
The Forbidden Power of Blazing Burn is transferred into another one of the pillars atop Mount Thunderstrox. Drawing power from the four Forbidden Powers they collected, the Cloud of Monstrox grows to massive proportions and reveals why they are collecting Forbidden Powers. The pillars happen to be atop the head of the now-petrified Colossus of Ultimate Destruction which will awaken and lay waste to Knighton once 10 Forbidden Powers are collected. Back in the Fortrex, Clay's successor is revealed to be Aaron who will lead the Nexo Knights until a cure for Clay has been found. The Nexo Knights find the Stone Monster Army attempting to attack the city of Knighton. King Halbert, Queen Halbert, the Royal Guards, Sir Brickland, and the students at the Knights Academy work to defend Knighton from the Stone Monster Army. The Cloud of Monstrox plans to use his augmented lightning to fry every server in the Knighton Library Tower, thus wiping Merlok 2.0 (and therefore the Nexo Powers and all of his memories) out of existence. At the same time, Roberto Arnold works on carving something on a stone tablet. As the Nexo Knight approach Knighton, they fight their way passed the reanimated Grimrocs with the help of Dennis and Robot Hoodlum's Merry Mechs. The Nexo Knights arrive where they find King Halbert fighting the reanimated giant statues of the previous Knighton kings. At the s. Robin uses the Minitrex to link Merlok 2.0 to the servers so they can download the backup for his memories before the Cloud of Monstrox erases it. Unfortunately, while Merlok 2.0 is providing Aaron's battle suit with a Combo Power to defeat the Cloud of Monstrox, a bolt from the Cloud of Monstrox seemingly destroys him, but Aaron uses the Combo Power to send the Cloud of Monstrox back into his harmless book body. The Stone Monster Army returns to Mount Thunderstrox, believing themselves to be victorious. It is soon revealed that the Minitrex kept Merlok 2.0 alive and intact. Ava works to rebuild Merlok 2.0' systems in order to get him operational again. During this time, Robin in the Black Knight mech soon uncovers a carving on a stone tablet dropped by Roberto Arnoldi during the fight which describes the Cloud of Monstrox's plan to awaken the Colossus of Ultimate Destruction.

=== Season 4: Hard and Heavy (2017) ===
| No. overall | No. in season | Title | Directed by | Written by | Story by | Original release date | U.S. viewers (in millions) |
|---|---|---|---|---|---|---|---|
| 31 | 1 | "Weekend at Halbert's" | Jean Paul Vermeulen & Alan Simpson | Mark Hoffmeier | Tommy Andreasen, Thomas Sebastian Finger, Mikkel Lee & Mark Hoffmeier | August 21, 2017 | 0.57 |
Jestro gains the idea to ambush the Fortrex in hopes of cheering up the Cloud of Monstrox, who is still recovering after his defeat in the season 3 finale, unaware that the knights are at a party hosted by King Halbert. Fortunately, Ava is able to restore Merlok 2.0 to the Fortrex and he is able to provide the Knighton Academy students with a Nexo power that allows them to fight back against the Stone Monster Army, forcing them to retreat (as they do not have the Cloud of Monstrox to reanimate them) much to the Cloud of Monstrox's amusement. Meanwhile, King Halbert decides to throw a party to cheer up the kingdom in honour of Clay. Having not told anyone about Clay's situation the knights decide to remote control his battle suit. At the party, Macy loses control of Clay's battle suit forcing the Nexo Knights to pin it down. After the party, they reveal the truth about Clay to King and Queen Halbert and they agree not to mention it to the rest of the kingdom.: Notes: Fletch and Izzy from the Knights Academy book series make cameos with the students.
| 32 | 2 | "The Gray Knight" | Jerry Forder | Mark Hoffmeier | Tommy Andreasen, Thomas Sebastian Finger, Mikkel Lee & Mark Hoffmeier | August 22, 2017 | 0.53 |
The Nexo Knights return to the Fortrex and place Clay on top, saying that he is a statue commissioned by King Halbert. However, Merlok 2.0 is still experiencing problems with returning to the Fortrex such as short-term memory loss. Although he does tell Robin to start working on a "Secret Project" and advises him not to tell the others. Elsewhere, Jestro and the Cloud of Monstrox get their hands on the Rogul associated with the Forbidden Power of Shocking Scare (which temporarily eliminates all courage in the victim, rendering them too cowardly to fight back). But when the Nexo Knights use a combo power to adapt to the Forbidden Power, they gain the upper hand. Noticing Clay in his petrified state, the Cloud of Monstrox uses his lightning to restore him to life. However, Clay has been corrupted into the Cloud of Monstrox's loyal servant and ultimate weapon as the other knights are too reluctant to fight Clay. Now calling himself "The Gray Knight," Clay ambushes the Fortrex in hopes of destroying Merlok 2.0 once and for all. While the other Knights stall him, Merlok 2.0 prepares a spell that he hopes will restore Clay's morality. However, since Robin provided Merlok 2.0 with too much power, Clay is knocked back out of the Fortrex and the Knights become determined to find him. The next day, Clay wakes up still petrified and with no memory and finds himself in a western town in the desert.
| 33 | 3 | "The Good, the Bad and the Tightwad" | Jean Paul Vermeulen & Alan Simpson | John Derevlany | Tommy Andreasen, Thomas Sebastian Finger, Mikkel Lee & Mark Hoffmeier | August 23, 2017 | 0.56 |
Clay awakes in the western town of Nothing Hill, with Merlok's spell rendering him amnesiac. Noticing this, Jorah Tightwad decides to use this to his advantage by telling Clay that he is Tightwad's servant and having him threaten to destroy the town if the townspeople don't give Tightwad the rights to the nearby gold mine. When the other Nexo Knights locate Clay they split up to determine which route is faster with Macy and Lance arriving first. Due to Clay's amnesia, they are forced to battle him. Meanwhile, Axl and Aaron find Jestro and the Stone Monster Army testing out the Forbidden Power of Shocking Scare, and Axl is struck with Shocking Scare, stripping him of all courage. Fortunately, Aaron is able to fend off Jestro and escape with Axl. They arrive in Nothing hill just as Macy and Lance restore Clay's memories. With his memories and morality restored, Clay sends Tightwad out of Nothing Hill and gives the gold he mined to the townspeople and Axl regains his courage. However, Jestro manages to transfer Shocking Scare into another one of the pillars atop Mount Thunderstrox.
| 34 | 4 | "In His Majesty's Secret Service" | Jerry Forder | David McDermott | Tommy Andreasen, Thomas Sebastian Finger, Mikkel Lee & Mark Hoffmeier | August 24, 2017 | 0.51 |
Clay has seemingly turned evil again and has wiped out the Nexo Knights. Fortunately, this news broadcast was falsified in order to deceive Jestro and the Cloud of Monstrox. However, in order to get Clay to infiltrate them, he goes through spy training under the teachings of Jack Shields (a parody of James Bond). Clay, posing as his villainous self, infiltrates Jestro and the Cloud of Monstrox's forces. He finds out about their plans to collect the Forbidden Powers. As Clay shakes Ruina Stoneheart's hand, a surge of energy passes through them. Unfortunately when Robin's life is put on the line, Clay's cover is blown, but the other Nexo Knights swiftly launch an ambush on the Stone Monster Army, forcing them to retreat. Back at the Fortrex, Clay reveals Jestro and the Cloud of Monstrox's plan to the other knights, but Macy and Merlok 2.0 notice that Clay is no longer himself, and Merlok 2.0 believes that Ruina has cursed him with dark magic.
| 35 | 5 | "The Stranger in the Halps" | Alan Simpson | Jack Thomas | Tommy Andreasen, Thomas Sebastian Finger, Mikkel Lee & Mark Hoffmeier | August 25, 2017 | 0.57 |
After his rage sabotages an interrogation attempt, Clay leaves the team to meditate until he can control his rage. Elsewhere, Jestro and the Cloud of Monstrox have gotten their hands on the Forbidden Power of Devious Demolition (which causes parts of rocks objects and structures to break off). This Forbidden Power enables the Cloud of Monstrox to bring the debris created by it to life in order to overwhelm the Nexo Knights. When Jestro cause an avalanche that disables the Nexo Power transmitter, the Nexo Knights are forced to retreat to the top of a mountain where they meet up with Merlok's old friend, magician/demolitions expert "The Great Rockowski" who has devoted his life to pacifism until the Stone Monster Army destroy his topiary. After Rockowski forces the Stone Monster Army to retreat, the Nexo Power transmitter is repaired. Meanwhile, Devious Demolition is transferred into another pillar atop Mount Thunderstrox. While Clay is meditating, he sees Ruina invade his mind causing him to become even more violent, vengeful, and more than willing to send the entire Stone Monster Army, Jestro, and the Cloud of Monstrox to their graves.
| 36 | 6 | "Krakenskull" | Jerry Forder | John Derevlany | Tommy Andreasen, Thomas Sebastian Finger, Mikkel Lee & Mark Hoffmeier | August 28, 2017 | 0.49 |
After obtaining the Rogul that is associated with the Forbidden Power of Metal-Morphosis (which possesses the ability to turn gold into lead), Jestro and the Cloud of Monstrox buy and reanimate the petrified Lord Krakenskull, his Krakenbeast, and his army who were unearthed by Jorah Tightwad. When Lord Krakenskull uses his amalgamated Forbidden Power of Petrified Quake (which allows his Krakenbeast to generate earthquakes with a stomp and petrify objects with a roar), it petrifies the Nexo Knight's vehicles causing the Knights to retreat. When they regroup even with a combo Nexo Power, Lord Krakenskull's army proves to be indestructible until Clay arrives, destroys Petrified Quake enough to undo everything it had ever done, and unleashes a violent frenzy which is only halted when Ruina slows him down. Clay rejoins the Nexo Knights, although Ruina's plans are furthering into motion. After the Stone Monster Army retreats, they begin to head to Mt. Thunderstrox. Before that happens, Jestro uses Metal-Morphosis on Jorah Tightwad's gold city and coins as payback for cheating him and the Cloud of Monstrox out of the stolen gold they had previously stolen from Stinkin Rich and Happy Hill.
| 37 | 7 | "Heart of Stone" | Alan Simpson | FM De Marco | Tommy Andreasen, Thomas Sebastian Finger, Mikkel Lee & Mark Hoffmeier | August 29, 2017 | 0.55 |
After Clay goes into another frenzy during a training session, Lance is convinced that Aaron needs help being a leader. Meanwhile, Jestro and the Cloud of Monstrox have obtained the Roguls associated with the Forbidden Powers of Malicious Melting (which melts its target), Evil Evaporate (which evaporates water), and Confounding Confusion (which eliminates the victim's intelligence). Although they succeed in transferring the first two into the pillars atop Mount Thunderstrox, the Nexo Knights track them as they are headed to transfer the last one. Clay goes into another frenzy and destroys the Forbidden Power of Confounding Confusion, only to attempt to kill Ruina who reveals that she is Clay's mother, and curses Clay in hopes that he would follow in her footsteps. Returning to the Fortrex, Merlok 2.0 confirms that Ruina was telling the truth and that Clay possesses magical abilities that could even surpass his own. Realizing that his cursed rage can no longer be controlled, Clay uses his newfound magic to give Macy a Nexo Power that forces her to return him to his inanimate state, much to Macy's misery.
| 38 | 8 | "Between a Rock and a Hard Place" | Jerry Forder | Ernie Altbacker | Tommy Andreasen, Thomas Sebastian Finger, Mikkel Lee & Mark Hoffmeier | August 30, 2017 | 0.53 |
Recapping from the previous episode, Merlok 2.0 reveals that Ruina was not only Clay's mother but also Merlok's sister and fellow magic user and Wizard's Council member Wanda Moorington, who was originally pure-hearted until Monstrox's presence corrupted her, forcing Merlok to petrify her. As he is also Clay's uncle, Merlok becomes Clay's parental guardian while refraining from telling Clay about his inherent powers due to fear that he would end up like Ruina. Elsewhere, Jestro and the Cloud of Monstrox have obtained the final and most powerful Forbidden Power known as the Forbidden Power of Awesome Annihilation (which can reduce an entire town to ruins with a single explosive blast). After adapting to the combinations of their vehicles and battle suits, the Nexo Knights attempt to prevent the Stone Monster Army from transferring the last Forbidden Power into Mount Thunderstrox. Alas, Awesome Annihilation is transferred into the last pillar atop Mount Thunderstrox and through the process of a lengthy and powerful electrical storm, Mount Thunderstrox is destroyed as the Stone Colossus of Ultimate Destruction awakens from within it. When the process is complete, the Cloud of Monstrox enters and possesses the Colossus and relieves Jestro of command. As the Colossus of Ultimate Destruction marches towards a nearby town, with the Stone Army following after it. Aaron is unsure how to defeat it. Back in the Fortrex, Clay's petrified body begins cracking as an unnatural blue glow is emitted from it.
| 39 | 9 | "March of the Colossus" | Alan Simpson | Mark Hoffmeier | Tommy Andreasen, Thomas Sebastian Finger, Mikkel Lee & Mark Hoffmeier | August 31, 2017 | 0.48 |
The Nexo Knights begin evacuating people out of towns and villages as the Colossus of Ultimate Destruction (which is still under Monstrox's control) destroys them one by one with the Forbidden Powers. The Nexo Knights try to lure him onto a bridge that they intend to destroy so that he will fall into the chasm below and buy them time for Robin to finish his "Secret Secret Project". However, in order for the project to be complete, Merlok 2.0 must be transferred into the Knighton library. Meanwhile, in the Fortrex, Clay's consciousness remains intact in his petrified body and he uses his magic to destroy his stone body and return to human form. Now back to his normal state of mind, Clay assists Robin with the project. However, the Colossus of Ultimate Destruction is able to escape the chasm while swallowing Axl whole in the process. As the remaining Knights (sans Clay) regroup at the Fortrex, Monstrox sets his sights on his next target: Knighton's castle in Knightonia.
| 40 | 10 | "The Fall" | Jerry Forder | Mark Hoffmeier | Tommy Andreasen, Thomas Sebastian Finger, Mikkel Lee & Mark Hoffmeier | September 1, 2017 | 0.48 |
After the village of Suburbington is destroyed, Axl manages to escape from the Colossus of Ultimate Destruction's bowels through the digestive system, much to his discomfort. The Nexo Knights then proceed to the Knighton library, where Merlok 2.0 is transferred to and Robin's "Secret Secret Project" is completed and revealed to be an escape rocket. Macy, Lance, Aaron, and Axl are dropped onto the Colossus of Ultimate Destruction's head, but their attempts at weakening the Colossus by destroying its crown prove futile until Merlok 2.0 (whose consciousness was downloaded into a robotic body dubbed "Mechlok") and Clay join the battle. Clay absorbs the Nexo Powers from the database and uses his magic to create a combo Nexo Power to Mechlok that allows him to turn the Colossus into glass. With it now weakened, the Knights destroy the Forbidden Powers, and Clay technopathically manipulates the Fortrex to strike the Colossus in the heel, resulting in the monster crumbling to pieces, killing Monstrox, forcing the Stone Monsters to retreat, and returning Jestro to his normal form. The Nexo Knights celebrate at Knighton Castle and Clay becomes determined to find his mother and cure her. Meanwhile, Jestro and Roberto are cleaning up the remains of the Colossus of Ultimate Destruction. However, Ruina manages to steal one lone glowing fragment of the Colossus of Ultimate Destruction, a fragment containing Monstrux's soul (the story ends on a cliffhanger).
