= Lego Dreamzzz =

Lego theme

- Subject: Dream World
- Availability: August 1, 2023–January 1, 2026
- Total sets: 41 sets
- Characters: Mateo, Izzie, Zoey, Cooper, Logan, Mr. Oz, Mrs. Castillo, Z-Blob, Albert, Bunchu, Zian, The Nightmare King, The Grimspawn, The Night Hunter, The Never Witch
- TV series: Lego Dreamzzz
- Official website

Lego Dreamzzz (stylized as LEGO DREAMZzz) is a discontinued Lego theme about young builders on a journey from the waking world into an imaginative fantasy realm. The theme was first introduced in 2023. The toy line is accompanied by an animated television series, also called Lego DREAMZzz, which was released on Lego's YouTube channel in May 2023, as well as being available to stream on Amazon Prime Video and Netflix.

== Overview ==
The product line focuses on Mateo, Izzie, Cooper, Logan and Zoey who enter the Dream World and battle against the Nightmare King and the Grimspawn who want to corrupt all of the dream realms and every dream creature contained within them.

== Development ==
Lego Dreamzzz was developed by The Lego Group in 2019. Cerim Manovi, creative director, said that the theme explores "what happens when dreams become real, [when] ordinary kids become extraordinary and creativity is a superpower."

Dreamzzz is a "big bang" Lego line, which are original themes intended to be produced across multiple years and accompanied by media such as books, video games, or TV series. Dreamzzz was likely inspired by five past "big bang" themes: Hidden Side, Nexo Knights, Vidiyo, Ninjago, and Elves.

Manovi said the theme was conceived to help children deal with bad things in their lives and he wanted the series to "inspire conversation" between children and their parents. He explained, "Because having seen these characters deal successfully with their nightmares, in this fantasy setting, might actually equip [kids] to be like, 'Okay, now I'm less afraid of it. Maybe I can face it head on'."

== Launch ==
Lego Dreamzzz theme was launched on 1 August 2023. As part of the marketing campaign, The Lego Group released eleven sets based on the first season of the accompanying TV show, Lego Dreamzzz: Trials of the Dream Chasers. Each set features different dream creatures, buildings and vehicles. Minifigures including Mateo, Izzie, Cooper, Logan and Zoey were released as well. The sets were designed primarily for children with an age rating of 7+ or above.

== Characters ==
=== Dream Chasers ===
- Mateo: A talented artist who has a sidekick named Z-Blob in the dream world. Voiced by Marcos "Macro" Cardenas.
- Izzie: A comedian and Mateo's younger sister. Voiced by Larissa Dias.
- Zoey: A new student of Francine Wooley Middle School, a musician and Mrs. Castillo's neighbour. Voiced by Sarah Jeffery.
- Cooper: Mateo, Izzie and Logan's best friend. Voiced by Mike Taylor.
- Logan: An athlete and gamer. Voiced by Vincent Tong.

=== Allies ===
- Mr. Oz: A high school science teacher at the Night Bureau. Voiced by Brian Drummond.
- Mrs. Castillo: An eccentric and wise old lady. Voiced by Maria del Mar.

=== Dream creatures ===
- Z-Blob: Mateo's goo-based creation who can transform into warriors and vehicles in the dream world.
- Bunchu: Izzie's plushie bunny who can transform into a ferocious beast in the dream world.
- Zian: Zoey's giant cat-owl hybrid in the dream world.
- Albert: Mr. Oz's type-A, engineering focused side manifests as a space-faring chimpanzee in the dream world. Voiced by Clay St. Thomas.

=== Villains ===
- The Nightmare King: The main antagonist of the series, the Nightmare King is the evil ruler of the Grim Realm who wants to corrupt all of the dream worlds and every dream creature contained within them. Voiced by Brian Drummond.
- Night Hunter: Nightmare King's second-in-command who is armed with Shadow Bolt arrows. Voiced by Alessandro Juliani.
- The Grimspawn: The Nightmare King's army.

== Construction sets ==
According to BrickLink, The Lego Group released a total of 55 Lego sets and promotional polybags as part of Lego Dreamzzz theme.

=== Sets ===
On 1 August 2023, eleven sets were released based on the TV series. The eleven sets include the Crocodile Car, Stable of Dream Creatures, Mr. Oz's Spacebus, Fantastical Tree House and Nightmare Shark Ship. Each of the sets include a 2-in-1 ‘guided creativity’ experience similar to Lego Creator 3-in-1 sets. The instructions split into two parts that allow young builders to choose two different ways to build models. Cerim Manovi described it as a ‘choose your adventure moment’ and stated, "What we want is [for] the kids to see they’re not just supposed to build the perfect model as it is on the box. They’re actually also okay to create something on their own… It’s just a simple tool to take away the fear of the blank canvas." In addition, a promotional polybag set namely Z-Blob and Bunchu Spider Escape was released as well.

== Television series ==
Lego Dreamzzz
- Genre: Action; Adventure; Comedy; Fantasy
- Written by: Nathan Shepherd; Melissa G. Shepherd; Peter Sattler; Julia Prescott; Shakira Pressley; Lizzi Oyebode; Ghia Godfree; Tommy Andreasen; Doreen Spicer-Dannelly; Akira "Mark" Fujita; Jeremy Adams; Annie Nishida; Ernie Altbacker; Haley Mancini; Angela Entzminger; Mark Hoffmeier
- Directed by: Chris Neuhahn; Fred Cline; Fred Reyes; Joel Salaysay; Julia Briemle; Shawn Gulley; Kiran Sangherra; Megan Russell; Oskar Koepke; Clint Butler
- Voices of: Marcos "Macro" Cardenas; Larissa Dias; Mike Taylor; Vincent Tong; Sarah Jeffery; Brian Drummond; Adam Nurada; Laara Sadiq; Alessandro Juliani; Clay St. Thomas; Maria del Mar
- Music by: Michael Tavera; Caleb Chan; Brian Chan
- Countries of origin: Canada; Denmark; United States
- Original language: English
- No. of seasons: 3
- No. of episodes: 60 (+2 specials)

Production
- Executive producers: Jill Wilfert; Keith Malone; Asa Tait; Tommy Andreasen; Nathan Shepherd; Melissa G. Shepherd; Joshua R. Wexler; Sanjee Gupta; Josh Scherba; Stephanie Betts; Morgana Duque
- Producers: Pamela J. Keller; Cassie Price; Crisma Nazareth; Genevieve Lebel; Tommy Andreasen
- Running time: 22 minutes
- Production companies: Pure Imagination Studios; The LEGO Group; WildBrain Studios

Original release
- Network: Amazon Prime Video (U.S.); Cartoon Network (Southeast Asia); Netflix (U.S.); YouTube (U.S.)
- Release: May 15, 2023 – October 2, 2026

Related
- Ninjago; Legends of Chima; Nexo Knights; Ninjago: Dragons Rising

Lego Dreamzzz is an animated TV series based on the Lego theme of the same name, produced by Pure Imagination Studios. The series premiered on YouTube, Amazon Prime, Netflix, Sky and ITVX on May 15, 2023 in the United Kingdom. Its first season consists of twenty episodes, with a second season releasing on May 17, 2024, and a third and final season releasing on Netflix on June 5, 2025.

The first two episodes were dedicated to series writer Nathan Shepherd and series animatic editor Karl Laundy, both of whom died during production.

=== Cast ===
==== Main ====
- Marcos "Macro" Cardenas: Mateo
- Larissa Dias: Izzie
- Mike Taylor: Cooper
- Vincent Tong: Logan
- Sarah Jeffery: Zoey
- Brian Drummond: Mr. Oz
- Nicole Anthony: Astrid

==== Ninjago (Note: Ninjago - Dream Team only) ====
- Michael Adamthwaite: Jay
- Paul Dobson: Master Wu
- Andrew Francis: Cole
- Sam Vincent: Lloyd Garmadon
- Kelly Metzger: Nya
- Brent Miller: Zane
- Vincent Tong: Kai

==== Villains ====
- Brian Drummond: Migo/Nightmare King, Nightmare Oz
- Marcos "Macro" Cardenas: MadTeo
- Mike Taylor: Dooper
- Vincent Tong: Bogan, Cake, Cake Monsters
- Sarah Jeffery: Doey
- Nicole Anthony: Bad Astrid
- Brian Dobson: The Brain
- Paul Dobson: DR ZS
- Ian Ronningen: R Node

==== Minor ====
- Adam Nurada: Coach Jeffries, Delivery Boy, Construction Worker
- Adam Kirschner: Lance
- Barbara Kottmeier: Jasmin
- Belinda Metz: Old Lady Hologram
- Jesse Moss: Dallas
- Giles Panton: Mr. Sandman, Masked Hero
- Ian Prince: Phil the Manticore
- Laara Sadiq: Cooper’s mom
- Zion Simpson: Jayden
- Tabitha St. Germain: Baby Strick, Ms. Putnam
- Vincent Tong: Child, Cooper’s brother
- Travis Turner: Jan, Emil
- Jennifer Robertson: Maker
- Liza Huget: Unmaker
- Elyse Maloway: Sister Witch
- Kyra Leroux: Miya
- Katrina Reynolds: Hannah
- Ingrid Nilson: Scarlet
- Kathleen Barr: Frida
- Brian Dobson: Hans
- Ian Hanlin: Klaus

==== Supporting ====
- Stephen Lobo: José/D-Shock
- Belinda Metz: Strick
- Maryke Hendrikse: Nova
- Vincent Tong: Sneak
- Adam Nurada: Snivel
- Laara Sadiq: Susan
- Alessandro Juliani: Night Hunter/Beau, Excited Kid Peter
- Clay St. Thomas: Albert
- Ian James Corlett: Mr. Hopper, Guitarist
- Maria del Mar: Mrs. Castillo/Lunia
- Larissa Dias: Dallas’s friend, Dizzy
- Brian Dobson: Forgemaster, News Stand Guy, Sinister Trophy
- Brian Drummond: Jim, Speaker System, Radio Voice
- Jennifer Hale: Burrzerker
- Samantha Hum: Max
- Nicole Oliver: Never Witch
- Giles Panton: Claudius/Dreamsmasher
- Elana Dunkelman: Dawn/One
- Christian Sloan: Nero/Zero
- Colleen Wheeler: The Undreamt

==== How to Fast Train Your Furious Dragon (Note: How to Fast Train Your Furious Dragon only) ====
- Ian Hanlin: Hiccup

=== Seasons ===
Season	Subtitle	Episodes	Originally released	
Season	Subtitle	Episodes	First released	Last released
1	Trials of the Dream Chasers	20	May 15, 2023	August 11, 2023
Special	Ninjago - Dream Team	1	December 1, 2023	
2	Night of the Never Witch	20	May 17, 2024	September 6, 2024
3	Enter The Cyber Game	20	June 5, 2025	August 1, 2025
Special	How to Fast Train Your Furious Dragon	1	October 2, 2026	

==== Season 1: Trials of the Dream Chasers (2023) ====
No. overall	No. in season	Title	Directed by	Written by	Storyboard by	Original release date
1	1	"Awakening"	Chris Neuhahn	Nathan Shepherd & Melissa G. Shepherd	Juan Luis Bravo & Gloria McAndrew	May 15, 2023
2	2	"Dream Chasers"	Chris Neuhahn	Nathan Shepherd & Melissa G. Shepherd	Bryan Baugh & Jake Larsen	May 15, 2023
3	3	"Chased Dreamers"	Chris Neuhahn	Nathan Shepherd & Melissa G. Shepherd	Juan Luis Bravo & Gloria McAndrew	May 15, 2023
4	4	"The Dream Forge"	Chris Neuhahn	Nathan Shepherd & Melissa G. Shepherd	Bryan Baugh & Jake Larsen	May 15, 2023
5	5	"Peak Performance"	Chris Neuhahn	Peter Sattler	Roger Dondis & Brandon Kruse	May 15, 2023
6	6	"The Anomaly"	Fred Cline	Julia Prescott & Peter Sattler	Bryan Baugh & Jake Larsen	May 15, 2023
7	7	"Cheat Code"	Fred Reyes	Shakira Pressley	Juan Luis Bravo & Gloria McAndrew	May 15, 2023
8	8	"The Bigger Picture"	Fred Reyes	Lizzi Oyebode, Nathan Shepherd & Melissa G. Shepherd	Bryan Baugh & Jake Larsen	May 15, 2023
9	9	"Short Sheeped"	Fred Cline	Ghia Godfree	Roger Dondis & Brandon Kruse	May 15, 2023
10	10	"The Grim Escape"	Fred Cline	Nathan Shepherd & Melissa G. Shepherd	Juan Luis Bravo & Gloria McAndrew	May 15, 2023
11	11	"Dreamer’s Block"	Fred Reyes	Peter Sattler	Roger Dondis & Brandon Kruse	August 11, 2023
12	12	"Monkey and the Bandit"	Fred Cline	Peter Sattler	Bryan Baugh & Jake Larsen	August 11, 2023
13	13	"Private Eye"	Fred Reyes	Peter Sattler	Bryan Baugh & Jake Larsen	August 11, 2023
14	14	"Songs of the Mist"	Fred Cline	Nathan Shepherd & Melissa G. Shepherd	Roger Dondis & Brandon Kruse	August 11, 2023
15	15	"Sweet Dreams"	Fred Reyes	Ghia Godfree	Roger Dondis & Brandon Kruse	August 11, 2023
16	16	"The Worthy Dreamer"	Fred Reyes	Ghia Godfree	Juan Luis Bravo, Gloria McAndrew & Jake Kim	August 11, 2023
17	17	"The Light of Nocturnia"	Fred Cline	Ghia Godfree	Juan Luis Bravo, Gloria McAndrew & Jake Kim	August 11, 2023
18	18	"Night Hunted"	Fred Cline	Nathan Shepherd & Melissa G. Shepherd	Bryan Baugh & Jake Larsen	August 11, 2023
19	19	"The Rift"	Fred Reyes	Nathan Shepherd & Melissa G. Shepherd	Gloria McAndrew & Jake Kim	August 11, 2023
20	20	"Enter the Nightmare"	Fred Cline	Nathan Shepherd & Melissa G. Shepherd	Roger Dondis & Brandon Kruse	August 11, 2023

==== Crossover special (2023) ====
Title	Directed by	Written by	Storyboard by	Original release date
"Ninjago - Dream Team"	Joel Salaysay	Tommy Andreasen	Jean Texier, Anette Hoffman, Julia Briemle, Swarna Prasad, Prasenjit Singha, Satyajit Mondal & Chris Paluszek	December 1, 2023
This episode includes a crossover with Ninjago, though its story is just a dream from both shows' main characters.

==== Season 2: Night of the Never Witch (2024) ====
No. overall	No. in season	Title	Directed by	Written by	Storyboard by	Original release date
21	1	"Sheep Freak"	Julia Briemle	Ghia Godfree	Jean Texier & Doris Umschaden	May 17, 2024
22	2	"Memory Chasers"	Fred Reyes	Peter Sattler	Roger Dondis & Sia Mistry	May 17, 2024
23	3	"Sound of Sirens"	Fred Cline	Doreen Spicer-Dannelly	Anette Hoffmann & Jake Larsen	May 17, 2024
24	4	"Sick Beats"	Shawn Gulley	Ghia Godfree	Sara Kim & Antonia de Pieri	May 17, 2024
25	5	"Witchy Ways"	Julia Briemle	Nathan Shepherd & Melissa G. Shepherd	Jean Texier, Doris Umschaden & Chris Paluszek	May 17, 2024
26	6	"Toss and Turn"	Fred Reyes	Nathan Shepherd & Melissa G. Shepherd	Roger Dondis & Sia Mistry	May 17, 2024
27	7	"Romancing the Spear"	Joel Salaysay	Akira "Mark" Fujita & Melissa G. Shepherd	Haley Fox & Peter Macadams	May 17, 2024
28	8	"Beat the Clock"	Fred Cline	Peter Sattler	Anette Hoffmann & Jake Larsen	May 17, 2024
29	9	"Wake That Dreamer"	Julia Briemle	Ghia Godfree	Jean Texier, Doris Umschaden & Chris Paluszek	May 17, 2024
30	10	"A Tale of Two Teos"	Fred Reyes	Nathan Shepherd & Melissa G. Shepherd	Roger Dondis, Sia Mistry & Chris Paluszek	May 17, 2024
31	11	"Adventures in Robot-Sitting"	Fred Cline	Ghia Godfree	Anette Hoffmann & Jake Larsen	September 6, 2024
32	12	"Personal Space Invaders"	Julia Briemle	Melissa G. Shepherd	Jean Texier & Doris Umschaden	September 6, 2024
33	13	"Fistful of Doppelgangers"	Fred Reyes	Akira "Mark" Fujita	Roger Dondis & Cherrie Wang	September 6, 2024
34	14	"Irrational Treasure"	Fred Cline	Melissa G. Shepherd	Anette Hoffmann & Jake Larsen	September 6, 2024
35	15	"Mission Implausible"	Shawn Gulley	Melissa G. Shepherd	AJ Blake & Christine Biala	September 6, 2024
36	16	"Grim Vengeance"	Joel Salaysay	Melissa G. Shepherd	Sara Kim & Antonia de Pieri	September 6, 2024
37	17	"Crown Control"	Julia Briemle	Akira "Mark" Fujita	Jean Texier & Doris Umschaden	September 6, 2024
38	18	"The Promised Crown Affair"	Fred Reyes	Ghia Godfree	Roger Dondis & Cherrie Wang	September 6, 2024
39	19	"Now or Never Witch"	Fred Cline	Melissa G. Shepherd	Anette Hoffmann & Jake Larsen	September 6, 2024
40	20	"Never Forever"	Julia Briemle	Melissa G. Shepherd	Doris Umschaden, Jake Larsen & Cherrie Wang	September 6, 2024

==== Season 3: Enter the Cyber Game (2025) ====
No. overall	No. in season	Title	Directed by	Written by	Storyboard by	Original release date
41	1	"Everything's Changed"	Shawn Gulley	Jeremy Adams	Nicole Luo & Juan Sergio Alvarado Peréz	June 5, 2025
42	2	"Join the Club"	Kiran Sangherra	Annie Nishida	Haley Fox & Kent Webb	June 5, 2025
43	3	"Whack Race 2025"	Megan Russell	Ernie Altbacker	Peter Macadams & MJ Barros	June 5, 2025
44	4	"Dreamocracy"	Shawn Gulley	Haley Mancini	Eunice Chu & Megan Parker	June 5, 2025
45	5	"Freak-quencies"	Kiran Sangherra	Ghia Godfree	Brittany Brent & Tori Grant	June 5, 2025
46	6	"InterFEARence"	Megan Russell	Melissa G. Shepherd	Kori Allen & Stephanie Cruz	June 5, 2025
47	7	"Lunia"	Shawn Gulley	Jeremy Adams	Nicole Luo & Juan Sergio Alvarado Peréz	June 5, 2025
48	8	"Moving On Up"	Kiran Sangherra	Jeremy Adams	Haley Fox & Kent Webb	June 5, 2025
49	9	"Brainstorm"	Megan Russell	Jeremy Adams	Peter Macadams & MJ Barros	June 5, 2025
50	10	"Boxed In"	Shawn Gulley	Jeremy Adams	Eunice Chu & Megan Parker	June 5, 2025
51	11	"The Happy App Trap"	Kiran Sangherra	Angela Entzminger	Brittany Brent & Tori Grant	August 1, 2025
52	12	"Mission: Ungoggle-Able"	Megan Russell	Annie Nishida	Kori Allen & Stephanie Cruz	August 1, 2025
53	13	"D-Shock"	Shawn Gulley	Ernie Altbacker	Nicole Luo & Juan Sergio Alvarado Peréz	August 1, 2025
54	14	"Robot Fight Club"	Kiran Sangherra	Mark Hoffmeier	Haley Fox & Kent Webb	August 1, 2025
55	15	"Fish Out of Water"	Megan Russell	Melissa G. Shepherd	Peter Macadams & MJ Barros	August 1, 2025
56	16	"Cyber Drain"	Shawn Gulley	Annie Nishida	Eunice Chu & Megan Parker	August 1, 2025
57	17	"School Spirit"	Oskar Koepke & Kiran Sangherra	Jeremy Adams	Brittany Brent & Tori Grant	August 1, 2025
58	18	"The Undreamt"	Megan Russell	Ernie Altbacker	Kori Allen & Stephanie Cruz	August 1, 2025
59	19	"Missing Pieces"	Shawn Gulley	Jeremy Adams	Nicole Luo & Juan Sergio Alvarado Peréz	August 1, 2025
60	20	"Outside the Box"	Oskar Koepke & Kiran Sangherra	Jeremy Adams	Haley Fox & Kent Webb	August 1, 2025

==== Crossover special (2026) ====
Title	Directed by	Written by	Storyboard by	Original release date
"How to Fast Train Your Furious Dragon"	Clint Butler	Jeremy Adams; Story by : Jeremy Adams & Tommy Andreasen	Antonia de Pieri, Donna Leong, Haley Fox, Mike Myhre & Sara Kim	October 2, 2026
This episode includes a crossover with Fast & Furious and How to Train Your Dragon, though its story is just a dream from both franchises.

== Web shorts ==
The product line was accompanied by a series of animated short films that was released on YouTube.

=== Lego Dreamzzz shorts ===
#	Title	Release date	Notes
1	NEW LEGO DREAMZzz™ Original Series Cinematic Trailer	May 6, 2023	Lego Dreamzzz web shorts.
2	NEW LEGO Original Series Dream chasers to the rescue Teaser short	May 8, 2023	Lego Dreamzzz web shorts.
3	Welcome to a world of dreams	May 14, 2023	Lego Dreamzzz web shorts.
4	Is This a Dream?	May 23, 2023	Lego Dreamzzz web shorts.
5	The Dream World Needs You	May 23, 2023	Lego Dreamzzz web shorts.
6	The World of Your Wildest Dreams	May 24, 2023	Lego Dreamzzz web shorts.
7	Creatures You’ve Never Seen Before	May 25, 2023	Lego Dreamzzz web shorts.
8	You’ve Got The Power	May 25, 2023	Lego Dreamzzz web shorts.
9	BREAKING NEWS: Portals opening to the… dreamworld ?!	June 1, 2023	Lego Dreamzzz web shorts.
10	LEGO® DREAMZzz™ Behind The Voices	June 18, 2023	Lego Dreamzzz web shorts.
11	Brand-new LEGO DREAMZzz™ episodes! Official Trailer	July 31, 2023	Lego Dreamzzz web shorts.
12	Build your dream adventure LEGO DREAMZzz™	August 1, 2023	Lego Dreamzzz web shorts.

=== Lego Dreamzzz Tutorial Draw Tutorials shorts ===
#	Title	Release date	Notes
1	LEGO® DREAMZzz™ Tutorial Draw Bunchu with Mateo	May 27, 2023	Lego Dreamzzz Tutorial Draw Tutorials web shorts.
2	LEGO® DREAMZzz™ Draw Z-Blob with Mateo	May 27, 2023	Lego Dreamzzz Tutorial Draw Tutorials web shorts.
3	LEGO® DREAMZzz™ Tutorial Draw Night Hunter with Mateo	June 3, 2023	Lego Dreamzzz Tutorial Draw Tutorials web shorts.
4	LEGO® DREAMZzz™ Tutorial Draw Croc Car with Mateo	June 6, 2023	Lego Dreamzzz Tutorial Draw Tutorials web shorts.
5	LEGO® DREAMZzz™ Tutorial Draw Zoey with Mateo	June 10, 2023	Lego Dreamzzz Tutorial Draw Tutorials web shorts.
6	LEGO® DREAMZzz™ Tutorial Draw Zian with Mateo	June 10, 2023	Lego Dreamzzz Tutorial Draw Tutorials web shorts.
7	LEGO® DREAMZzz™ Tutorial Draw Landscape with Mateo	June 17, 2023	Lego Dreamzzz Tutorial Draw Tutorials web shorts.
8	LEGO® DREAMZzz™ Tutorial Draw Explosions with Mateo	June 17, 2023	Lego Dreamzzz Tutorial Draw Tutorials web shorts.

=== Logan’s Training Tutorials shorts ===
#	Title	Release date	Notes
1	LEGO DREAMZzz shorts Logan’s Training Tutorials Episode 1	July 6, 2023	Logan’s Training Tutorials web shorts.
2	LEGO DREAMZzz shorts Logan’s Training Tutorials Episode 2	July 8, 2023	Logan’s Training Tutorials web shorts.
3	LEGO DREAMZzz shorts Logan’s Training Tutorials Episode 3	July 13, 2023	Logan’s Training Tutorials web shorts.
4	LEGO DREAMZzz shorts Logan’s Training Tutorials Episode 4	July 15, 2023	Logan’s Training Tutorials web shorts.
5	LEGO DREAMZzz shorts Logan’s Training Tutorials Episode 5	July 20, 2023	Logan’s Training Tutorials web shorts.
6	LEGO DREAMZzz shorts Logan’s Training Tutorials Episode 6	July 22, 2023	Logan’s Training Tutorials web shorts.
7	LEGO DREAMZzz shorts Logan’s Training Tutorials Episode 7	July 27, 2023	Logan’s Training Tutorials web shorts.
8	LEGO DREAMZzz shorts Logan’s Training Tutorials Episode 8	July 29, 2023	Logan’s Training Tutorials web shorts.
9	LEGO DREAMZzz shorts Logan’s Training Tutorials Episode 9	August 4, 2023	Logan’s Training Tutorials web shorts.
10	LEGO DREAMZzz shorts Logan’s Training Tutorials Episode 10	August 5, 2023	Logan’s Training Tutorials web shorts.

=== Dreamolition Duo shorts ===
#	Title	Release date	Notes
1	Dreamolition Duo vs. The Mutated Math Monsters	August 15, 2023	Dreamolition Duo web shorts.
2	Dreamolition Duo vs. The Shocker Ball	August 18, 2023	Dreamolition Duo web shorts.
3	Dreamolition Duo vs. the Pyro-Maniacs!	August 20, 2023	Dreamolition Duo web shorts.
4	Dreamolition Duo vs. the Pudding Pirates	August 21, 2023	Dreamolition Duo web shorts.
5	Dreamolition Duo vs. the Banana Bandit	August 23, 2023	Dreamolition Duo web shorts.
6	Dreamolition Duo vs. The Teenage Kung-Fu Vampire Hamster	August 24, 2023	Dreamolition Duo web shorts.
7	Dreamolition Duo vs. the Calamitous Cat Curse and the Menacing Mummies!	August 25, 2023	Dreamolition Duo web shorts.
8	Dreamolition Duo vs. the Zombie Students	August 26, 2023	Dreamolition Duo web shorts.
9	Dreamolition Duo vs. the Big, Bad, Bionic, BEAThoven!	August 27, 2023	Dreamolition Duo web shorts.
10	Dreamolition Duo vs. the Slimy Scary Space Saturnians	August 28, 2023	Dreamolition Duo web shorts.

=== Z-Blob in Left Alone shorts ===
#	Title	Release date	Notes
1	Z-Blob in Left Alone Part I	August 20, 2023	Z-Blob in Left Alone web shorts.
2	Z-Blob in Left Alone Part II	August 19, 2023	Z-Blob in Left Alone web shorts.
3	Z-Blob in Left Alone Part III	August 19, 2023	Z-Blob in Left Alone web shorts.

=== Mr. Oz Explains shorts ===
#	Title	Release date	Notes
1	Meet Zian	September 9, 2023	Mr. Oz Explains web shorts.
2	Meet Zoey	September 9, 2023	Mr. Oz Explains web shorts.
3	Meet the Night Hunter	September 9, 2023	Mr. Oz Explains web shorts.
4	Meet the Grimkeepers	September 9, 2023	Mr. Oz Explains web shorts.
5	Meet Mateo	September 9, 2023	Mr. Oz Explains web shorts.
6	Meet Izzie	September 14, 2023	Mr. Oz Explains web shorts.
7	Meet Cooper	September 14, 2023	Mr. Oz Explains web shorts.
8	Meet Bunchu	September 14, 2023	Mr. Oz Explains web shorts.
9	Meet Grimspawn	September 14, 2023	Mr. Oz Explains web shorts.
10	Meet Logan	September 14, 2023	Mr. Oz Explains web shorts.

== Attractions ==
In June 2023, Lego Dreamzzz 4D film was launched in August 2023 at Legoland Windsor Resort and Legoland Discovery Center Bay Area.

== See also ==
- Lego Hidden Side
- Lego Legends of Chima
- Nexo Knights
- Lego Vidiyo
- Lego Ninjago
- Lego Elves
