= Injustice (2021 film) =

Film by Matt Peters

- Official DVD cover
- Directed by: Matt Peters
- Written by: Ernie Altbacker
- Based on: Injustice: Gods Among Us by NetherRealm Studios; Injustice: Gods Among Us: Year One by Tom Taylor
- Produced by: Rick Morales; Jim Krieg
- Starring: Justin Hartley; Anson Mount
- Edited by: Craig Paulsen
- Music by: Robert J. Kral
- Production companies: Warner Bros. Animation; DC Entertainment; NetherRealm Studios
- Distributed by: Warner Bros. Home Entertainment
- Release date: October 19, 2021
- Running time: 78 minutes
- Country: United States
- Language: English

Injustice is a 2021 American adult animated superhero film loosely based on the Injustice video game series developed by NetherRealm Studios and featuring characters from DC Comics. Produced by Warner Bros. Animation and DC Entertainment, and distributed by Warner Bros. Home Entertainment, it is the 47th installment in the DC Universe Animated Original Movies line. The film is directed by Matt Peters from a story by Ernie Altbacker, and stars Justin Hartley and Anson Mount as Superman and Batman, respectively.

The film was announced in May 2021, with Altbacker writing the script. It adapts elements from both the video game Injustice: Gods Among Us (2013) and its prequel comic book series (primarily the Year One arc), but tells an original narrative which diverges from the source material. Set in a separate continuity from the main DC Universe, the story follows Superman's descent into madness after being tricked by the Joker into killing his pregnant wife Lois Lane and detonating a nuclear weapon that destroys Metropolis. As Superman transforms the Earth into a police state to enforce global peace, Batman forms an underground resistance to oppose Superman and his allies.

== Plot ==
On an alternate Earth (known as Earth-22), the Joker and Harley Quinn kill Jimmy Olsen, kidnap a pregnant Lois Lane, and steal a nuclear weapon, which they connect to a heart rate monitor linked to Lois' heart. Upon hearing of Lois' capture, Batman calls the Justice League to find her. The Flash finds the Scarecrow dead in his lab and his supply of fear toxin missing before being killed by a trap laid by the Joker. Lois' husband, a panicking Superman, eventually finds the Joker and Harley hiding on a submarine but is attacked by Doomsday, whom he punches into space. As the other heroes arrive and apprehend the Joker and Harley, Batman realizes that they have mixed the fear toxin with kryptonite and used it to make Superman hallucinate that he is fighting Doomsday; in reality, he has beaten Lois to death. When her heart stops, the bomb attached to her detonates, destroying Metropolis and killing 11 million people.

As Batman interrogates the Joker, the latter reveals that he grew tired of losing to him, so he decided to target Superman instead. At that moment, Superman arrives and, in his anger and grief, kills the Joker. To protect Harley from a similar fate, Green Arrow takes her to his hideout. Meanwhile, Superman reveals his identity before the United Nations and announces his intentions to bring peace to Earth, by force if necessary. The Justice League is left divided over Superman's actions; some members, such as Wonder Woman, support his new methods, while others, like Batman, keep their no-killing vow. Other heroes, such as Aquaman, Shazam, and the other magic users, refuse to choose sides and leave the League. Hal Jordan also leaves, stating that he and his fellow Green Lanterns are being recalled to Oa.

Meanwhile, the United States government becomes concerned that Superman will interfere in its operations, and has Mirror Master kidnap Jonathan Kent to use as leverage against him. Superman begins to question his actions, but Wonder Woman reassures him that he is doing the right thing and offers to help find Jonathan. Confronting Mirror Master, she learns Jonathan's whereabouts, allowing Superman to rescue him. Elsewhere, Batman confronts the President and warns him that Superman will kill him if he finds out that he ordered Jonathan's capture.

Later, Superman visits Batman in the Batcave to make peace, but they get into an argument over their ideological views, and Batman refuses to join Superman. While trying to stop Superman from relocating Arkham Asylum inmates to a more secure facility, Batman and Nightwing are shocked to discover that Robin has joined Superman. Harley, who escaped from Green Arrow's hideout and decided to become a hero, releases the inmates, forcing Batman and Superman to temporarily join forces to fight them. During the battle, Robin lashes out in anger and accidentally kills Nightwing, leading a grieving Batman to disown him; he is later comforted by Catwoman after Superman informs her of Batman's loss. In the afterlife, Nightwing meets Rama Kushna, who transforms him into Deadwing.

Robin attempts to convince Superman to ally with Ra's al Ghul, but he declines. Meanwhile, Batman forms an underground Insurgency and plans to steal a red sun cannon from the Fortress of Solitude to counter Superman. The plan fails as Superman overpowers Captain Atom, Ra's kills the Atom and destroys the cannon, and one of Green Arrow's shots is deflected by Superman, accidentally killing Jonathan, whom Superman has been keeping safe at the Fortress; in response, Superman murders Green Arrow in a blind rage.

After Superman transforms the Earth into a police state using surveillance drones created by Mister Terrific, Batman has Plastic Man break Mister Terrific out of prison and leaks video footage of Superman killing a group of teenagers inspired by the Joker to ruin his public image, shocking Wonder Woman. In response, Superman allies with Ra's and dispatches Amazo to enforce global peace. However, the android quickly turns violent, as Ra's secretly programmed it to kill Superman. Amazo kills Hawkman and Cyborg before the Insurgents arrive and help Superman and Wonder Woman destroy the android. Meanwhile, Robin, having had a change of heart, defeats Ra's with Deadwing's help and spares his life.

Despite their aid, Superman prepares to have the Insurgents arrested, and incapacitates Wonder Woman after she turns on him. However, he is then confronted by an alternate Superman from another universe, who was summoned by Mister Terrific. The alternate Superman holds back and is defeated by the corrupted Superman, but the latter stands down after being met by an alternate Lois (from Earth-9), also brought by Mister Terrific. Lois reveals that she lost her Superman after becoming pregnant with his child, and reminds the corrupted Superman that all life is sacred. Realizing how far he has fallen, Superman surrenders himself and agrees to be imprisoned. Although unsure of what will happen next, Batman makes preparations to rebuild the world and for his future with Catwoman.

== Cast ==
Voice actor	Character	Notes
Justin Hartley	Kal-El / Clark Kent / Superman	George Newbern was originally going to reprise Superman but is replaced by Hartley.
Anson Mount	Bruce Wayne / Batman	Kevin Conroy was originally going to reprise Batman but is replaced by Mount.
Laura Bailey	Lois Lane, Rama Kushna	Two characters were off screen in the original game only.
Zach Callison	Damian Wayne/Robin, Jimmy Olsen	Jimmy Olsen was off screen in the original game and Neal McDonough was originally going to reprise Robin but is replaced by Callison and is off screen in the original game also and on screen in the second game.
Brian T. Delaney	Hal Jordan / Green Lantern	Adam Baldwin was originally going to reprise Green Lantern but is replaced by Delaney.
Brandon Micheal Hall	Victor Stone / Cyborg	Khary Payton was originally going to reprise Cyborg but is replaced by Hall.
Andrew Morgado	Mirror Master Soldier	
Edwin Hodge	Michael Holt / Mister Terrific, Waylon Jones / Killer Croc	
Oliver Hudson	Patrick O'Brian / Plastic Man	
Gillian Jacobs	Harleen Quinzel / Harley Quinn	
Yuri Lowenthal	Evan McCulloch / Mirror Master, Barry Allen / The Flash, Billy Batson / Shazam	
Derek Phillips	Dick Grayson / Nightwing / Deadwing, Arthur Curry / Aquaman	
Kevin Pollak	Joker, President of the United States, Jonathan Kent	
Anika Noni Rose	Selina Kyle / Catwoman	
Reid Scott	Oliver Queen / Green Arrow, Victor Zsasz	
Faran Tahir	Ra's al Ghul	
Fred Tatasciore	Nathaniel Adam / Captain Atom	
Janet Varney	Diana Prince / Wonder Woman	

== Production ==
In June 2021, an animated film based on the 2013 video game Injustice: Gods Among Us was announced. The voice cast for the film was announced the following month, on July 21.

== Release ==
=== Streaming and home media ===
The film debuted at the third position on the "NPD Videoscan First Alert" weekly rankings for overall home media sales and Blu-ray sales in the United States. According to The Numbers, it sold 43,317 Blu-ray units and 7,568 DVD units in its first week of release for a revenue of $1.16 million. It also ranked fifth on both Google Play and Vudu's VOD charts. In the United Kingdom, it debuted at the tenth rank on the Official Film Chart.

In the second week of its release in the United States, Injustice fell to the fifth rank on the Blu-ray sales chart and eighth rank in overall disc sales. At the end of October, it ranked tenth in overall disc sales during the month. The film re-entered Google Play's top 10 films chart in its third week, ranking fifth, falling to the tenth rank in the following week.

Unlike the games, which are Rated T from the ESRB, the film is Rated R for Bloody Violence. The film was released on October 19, 2021, on Blu-ray, 4K Ultra HD and in digital format. The DVD was exclusively released for Walmart stores. On October 9, the entire film was leaked online, ten days before its planned release date.

The Blu-ray includes the featurette titled Adventures in Storytelling: Injustice – Crisis and Conflict, where the filmmakers discuss the production and themes of the film, as well as the Justice League episode "Injustice for All".

The film made its linear debut in the United States on Adult Swim's Toonami block on February 19, 2023.

== Reception ==
Injustice received mixed reviews. On the review aggregator website Rotten Tomatoes, 50% of 6 critics' reviews are positive, with an average rating of 5.60/10. Critics praised the film's action sequences and voice performances , while both the plot and animation received a polarized response. Criticism was directed at the pacing and differences from the source material, which saw many elements being either removed or underdeveloped to fit the game and comic's story in a single film.
