= Chris Neuhahn =

American animator and author (born 1972)

Chris Neuhahn (born January 5, 1972) is an American animator, author and producer from San Diego, California. He is best known for his key roles in bringing the penguin characters from DreamWorks Animation's two Madagascar movies into cable TV series format for Nickelodeon. He has won three Telly Awards for public service announcements that he directed and animated. Chris describes himself as a "burning mass of heaving animation energy."

== Early life and career ==
Chris was one of four brothers who grew up in the eastern county area of San Diego. His father was a US Air Force veteran and later a bus driver for the city of San Diego while his mother developed a real-estate business operating in greater San Diego. Chris worked across a vast spectrum of employment opportunities while he was growing up, including fast-food restaurants and automotive performance equipment manufacturing and rebuilding. He attended El Capitan High School in Lakeside and Granite Hills High School in El Cajon. Popular movies developed into a passion while still in his teens and coincided with his work at a Continental Graphics where he worked on Part Catalogs for the Boeing 747-400 and Air Force One. Exposure to computer-automated design ignited his interest in computer graphics and he started using commercial software packages to develop his production and narrative storytelling abilities. Chris' burgeoning skills led to work with Legal Arts and teaching classes and seminars for Autodesk. Chris also worked at Presto Studios where he worked on popular computer games like Myst III Exile. He also maintained a freelance work regimen working with Artemis and Autocannon

Chris moved to Los Angeles in 2002 and worked for Brain Zoo Studios on Activision's Pitfall Harry game re-release in 2003. Other work projects included the SciFi Channel's Tripping the Rift series at Film Roman and Nickelodeon Animation Studios' Tak.

In 2006 DreamWorks Animation Studios chose Nickelodeon to produce a series for TV based on the penguin characters from the Madagascar movies. Chris helped outline the production processes and methods that permit expansive and lush computer-rendered imagery based upon tight and minimal television budgets. Chris helps direct story content while supervising the visual aspects of the production across a team of eighty-five staff artists. As of June 2009, The Penguins of Madagascar was the highest-rated animated television show playing on American cable networks.

== Author ==
Chris is the author of two books on narrative storytelling through computer graphics, The Maya 6 Handbook and Professional Short Films with Autodesk 3ds Max.

== Extracurricular ==
Chris pursues activities of animation with focus equal to his work with computer graphics. He is a certified private pilot and owns a Grumman Tiger A5-B that he flies for fun over greater Los Angeles. He is an Advanced Open Water SCUBA diver.

== Animation ==
=== Television ===
- Tripping the Rift (2004): animator
- Tak and the Power of Juju (2008): animator
- The Penguins of Madagascar (2008-2010): animation supervisor
- Lego Dreamzz: Trials of the Dream Chasers (2023-present): supervising director

=== Video games ===
- Myst III: Exile (2001): animator
- Pitfall: The Lost Expedition (2004): cinematic animator

=== Web short ===
- Oedipus (2004): animation production assistant

== Producer ==
=== Television ===
- The Penguins of Madagascar (2009–2015): supervising producer, co-supervising producer, CG supervising producer
- Planet Sheen (2011–2013): supervising producer
- Monsters vs. Aliens (2013–2014): supervising producer
- VeggieTales in the House (2014–2016): supervising producer
- All Hail King Julien (2014–2016): supervising producer
- The Mr. Peabody & Sherman Show (2015): supervising producer
- Voltron: Legendary Defender (2016–2017): supervising producer
- Arcane (2021): supervising producer

=== Cinematic short ===
- Puss in Book: Trapped in an Epic Tale (2017): supervising producer
