= Nexo Knights =

Lego theme (2015–2018) and TV series (2015–2017)

- The Lego Nexo Knights logo
- Also known as: Lego Nexo Knights
- Genre: Science fantasy Action; Adventure; Science fiction comedy
- Developed by: Tommy Andreasen; Alexandre Boudon; Samuel Thomas Johnson; Martin Dalsgarrd; Heidi Rathschau Niesen
- Written by: Mark Hoffmeier; Ernie Altbacker; Andrew Robinson; John Derevlany; David McDermott; Jack Thomas; FM De Marco
- Directed by: Stu Gamble; Jerry Forder; Jean Paul Vermeulen; Dipan Gajjar; Alan Simpson
- Voices of: Michael Adamthwaite; Garry Chalk; Michael Daingerfield; Brian Drummond; Ian Hanlin; Jennifer Hayward; Maryke Hendrikse; Noel Johansen; Alessandro Juliani; Alan Marriott; Erin Mathews; Mark Oliver; Nicole Oliver; Giles Panton; Jason Simpson; Vincent Tong
- Theme music composer: Carpark North
- Opening theme: "Unbreakable" by Carpark North
- Composers: Tom Bailey; James Gosling
- Countries of origin: Denmark; Canada
- Original language: English
- No. of seasons: 4
- No. of episodes: 40 (list of episodes)

Production
- Executive producers: Torsten Jacobsen; Ole Holm Christensen; Lotte Kronborg; Mads Munk
- Producer: Peter Griffiths
- Running time: 22 minutes
- Production companies: The Lego Group; M2 Entertainment; Wilbros

Original release
- Network: Cartoon Network
- Release: December 13, 2015 – September 1, 2017

Related
- Ninjago; Legends of Chima; Ninjago: Dragons Rising; Lego Dreamzzz

Lego Nexo Knights (stylized in all caps) is a 3D-animated television series that aired on Cartoon Network and premiered in 2015. It was produced by the Lego Group to coincide with the Lego theme of the same name. The series is based on a highly-futuristic fantasy concept, blending medieval themes with futuristic inventions such as holograms, lasers, and mechs. Four seasons were produced, for a total of 40 episodes. The fourth season finished airing in 2017. In 2018, the Lego Group discontinued the Nexo Knights theme, which also resulted in the cancellation of the series. A fifth season was intended to be released with 1 wave of sets releasing for it; however, the show was cancelled before it aired.

== Synopsis ==
In a futuristic medieval world, Clay, Aaron, Lance, Princess Macy, and Axl are five young knights who protect the kingdom of Knighton and its capital Knightonia from Jestro, the Book of Monsters, and their army of Lava Monsters. They also receive help from the Knightonia Royal family, the digital wizard Merlok 2.0, Robin Underwood, and Ava Prentis.

== Main characters ==
The series follows five young knights that live in the Kingdom of Knighton.

- Clay Moorington (voiced by Giles Panton) – the leader of the Nexo Knights, often referred to as the "Uptight Knight". He turns to stone and briefly becomes evil later in the series.
- Princess Macy Halbert (voiced by Erin Mathews) – one of the Nexo Knights and the princess of Knighton.
- Lancelot "Lance" Richmond (voiced by Ian Hanlin) – one of the Nexo Knights from the rich city of Auremville.
- Aaron Fox (voiced by Alessandro Juliani) – one of the Nexo Knights, a thrill-seeker and daredevil. After Clay turns to stone, Aaron leads the Nexo Knights
- Axl (voiced by Brian Drummond) – the largest of the Nexo Knights. He has a very large appetite.
- Merlok 2.0 (voiced by Brian Drummond) – a digital wizard and the last wizard in all of Knighton. He provides the Nexo Knights with Nexo Powers.
- Robin Underwood (voiced by Erin Mathews) - the mechanic for the Nexo Knights who acts under the alias of the Black Knight.
- Ava Prentis (voiced by Maryke Hendrikse) - a whiz-kid and tech genius who scans the Nexo Powers for the Nexo Knights.
- Jestro (voiced by Vincent Tong) – a former court jester. He works with Monstrox.
- Monstrox (voiced by Mark Oliver) – an arch-necromancer and old nemesis of Merlok 2.0. He studied dangerous magic.

== Episodes ==
Season	Subtitle	Episodes	Originally released	
Season	Subtitle	Episodes	First released	Last released
1	The Book of Monsters	10	December 13, 2015	March 24, 2016
2	Books of Power	10	July 24, 2016	October 22, 2016
3	Storm Over Knighton	10	February 4, 2017	April 8, 2017
4	Hard and Heavy	10	August 21, 2017	September 1, 2017

== Concept ==
The Nexo Knights television series was part of a media and merchandising programme that aimed to launch Lego's next major original brand. Casper Thingholm of The Lego Group stated that the concept was "inspired by insights to meet the emerging needs of today's kids" and that Nexo Knights, "juxtaposes a timeless world of medieval knights with a futuristic twist".

== Broadcast ==
The series debuted on Cartoon Network in the United States on January 11, 2016, officially. It premiered on Cartoon Network Arabic in the Middle East and Gulli in France on December 18, 2015. Then it premiered on Cartoon Network in Central and Eastern Europe on November 28, 2015. It debuted on Cartoon Network in United Kingdom and Ireland on December 19, 2015, as a sneak peek and February 1, 2016, officially. It premiered on Cartoon Network in Turkey on December 19, 2015. It premiered on Cartoon Network in Nordic on December 23, 2015. It premiered on Cartoon Network in Poland on December 26, 2016, as Sneak Peek. It debuted on Teletoon in Canada on January 8, 2016. It debuted on Cartoon Network in Australia and New Zealand on February 6, 2016. It premiered on Cartoon Network in Africa on February 27, 2016. It made its Kix and Pop debut in the United Kingdom on March 4, 2017. The series was cancelled due to funding issues. On 1 August 2018, Executive Producer Tommy Andreasen confirmed the cancellation of the series on Twitter, stating, "Nexo Knights tv series has ended."

== Critical reception ==
Emily Ashby for Common Sense Media gave the series a three out of five star rating and commented, "This visually appealing series holds its own among the bevy of Lego productions, delivering action, adventure, and a lot of well-placed humor, but it doesn't break any new ground. The knights are a spunky group, and the mix of their very different personalities creates problems in some cases and good examples of teamwork and cooperation in others."

== Merchandise ==
Lego Nexo Knights
- Sub‑themes: Battle Packs, Battle Suits, Combo NEXO Powers, Season 1, Season 2, Season 3, Season 4, Season 5 and Ultimate
- Subject: Sci-Fi/ Medieval Fantasy mashup
- Availability: 2016–2018
- Total sets: 104
- Official website

Lego Nexo Knights is a discontinued fantasy-based castle Lego theme released in January 2016. Announced at New York Comic Con 2015, it incorporated thematic elements drawn from both earlier space and castle themes while adding a 21st-century digital spin. It replaced Legends of Chima, a theme released in 2013. It was eventually discontinued by the end of 2018.

=== Background ===
Lego Nexo Knights aimed to follow Lego Ninjago and Lego Legends of Chima as Lego's next intellectual property that was expected to become a multimedia success. This was driven by the fact that the Lego Ninjago theme had boosted profits by 27% and revenue by 23% in the first half of 2015.

=== Concept ===
The basis of the idea for Nexo Knights was to take something iconic and give it a futuristic element. The concept and story of Nexo Knights was the result of a long and thorough development process that involved a significant amount of testing with children around the world. Senior Design Manager Joakim Kørner Nielsen stated, "When we launch something this big we want to make sure that we have something that is appealing on all the levels and aspects that it's supposed to be for the kids in the right target group. He further explained, "We've done a lot of sketch models, mood boards, concept drawings, that we've travelled around the world with them, testing and making sure kids around the world got the point, got the key messages of the story and things like that. There's a lot of concept work like that that goes into it before you're actually able to execute the vision, and building the final models." Also Lego Designer Frederic Roland Andre said, "We tried to give a futuristic twist to the traditional castle universe and create a brand new LEGO universe. We kept a lot of icons from the knights: the weapons, armour, horses and castles and added elements such as holograms, computers and hover technology into it."

=== Development ===
Nexo Knights differed from the previous themes by introducing digital integration that connected the physical toys, the television series and video game content. This was applied by placing 150 knights shields around the kingdom of Knighton that could be found in the construction sets, online content, printed publications and the television show. These shields could then be scanned and collected by using the Merlock 2.0 app. Senior Design Manager Joakim Kørner Nielsen commented that this digital integration was the most challenging aspect of creating Nexo Knights. The development team also considered the balance between the physical toy and the digital experience. Nielsen commented, "Another thing we learned was, when testing with kids, they just see things in a different way. Things just flow together for them so easily between physical and digital and sometimes the boundaries just aren't there for them".

=== Launch ===
Nexo Knights was launched in the U.S. in late 2015. On 8 February 2016, The Lego Group announced a partnership with Cartoon Network. The Lego Nexo Knights product range was released along with the Merlok 2.0 game app. As part of the deal, Cartoon Network promoted the product range across its TV and digital platforms. In addition, Cartoon Network launched a 30-second webdrive to showcase the toy line to kids. Fourteen building sets were available for sale in January 2016. Additional building sets were launched in August 2016. The first two sets were revealed at New York Comic Con. The Lego Group reported that the Merlok 2.0 app had been downloaded 500,000 times in the first week of its launch. Ivan Zeng, senior manager of digital marketing, Lego APAC, stated that the launch campaign had incorporated various marketing strategies including Nexo Knights Academy, a mission-based Lego website, events, virtual reality experiences in store and content marketing, such as webisodes and social media activities to engage parents.

=== Construction sets ===
According to BrickLink, The Lego Group released a total of 104 Lego sets and promotional polybags as part of the Lego Nexo Knights theme. It was discontinued by the end of 2018.

==== Season 1 sets ====
In 2016, the eleven toy construction sets was released on 2 January 2016 and based on the first season. The eleven sets being released were Knighton Battle Blaster (set number: 70310), Chaos Catapult (set number: 70311), Lance's Mecha Horse (set number: 70312), Moltor's Lava Smasher (set number: 70313), Beast Master's Chaos Chariot (set number: 70314), Clay's Rumble Blade (set number: 70315), Jestro's Evil Mobile (set number: 70316), Fortrex (set number: 70317), Merlok's Library 2.0 (set number: 70324), Infernox Captures The Queen (set number: 70325) and The King's Mech (set number: 70327). In addition, six Ultimate sets were released, including Ultimate Clay (set number: 70330), Ultimate Macy (set number: 70331), Ultimate Aaron (set number: 70332), Ultimate Robin (set number: 70333), Ultimate Beast Master (set number: 70334) and Ultimate Lavaria (set number: 70335). Two Battle Packs were also released including Knights Army-Building Set (set number: 853515) and Monsters Army-Building Set (set number: 853516). In addition, four polybag sets were released as promotions, which included Knight's Cycle (set number: 30371), Robin's Mini Fortrex (set number: 30372), Knighton Hyper Cannon (set number: 30373) and The Lava Slinger (set number: 30374).

==== Season 2 sets ====
In 2016, the seven sets was released on 1 August 2016 and based on the second season. The seven sets released were The Glob Lobber (set number: 70318), Macy's Thunder Mace (set number: 70319), Aaron Fox's Aero-Striker V2 (set number: 70320), General Magmar's Siege Machine of Doom (set number: 70321), Axl's Tower Carrier (set number: 70322), Jestro's Volcano Lair (set number: 70323) and The Black Knight Mech (set number: 70326). In addition, four Ultimate sets were released including Ultimate Axl (set number: 70336), Ultimate Lance (set number: 70337), Ultimate General Magmar (set number: 70338) and Ultimate Flama (set number: 70339). These included five key chains attached to the minifigures of Aaron, Clay, Macy, Lance and Jestro.

==== Season 3 sets ====
In 2017, the six sets was released on 2 January 2017 based on the third season. The six sets released were King's Guard Artillery (set number: 70347), Lance's Twin Jouster (set number: 70348), Ruina's Lock & Roller (set number: 70349), The Three Brothers (set number: 70350), Clay's Falcon Fighter Blaster (set number: 70351) and Jestro's Headquarters (set number: 70352). In addition, two Combo NEXO Powers sets were released including Combo NEXO Powers Wave 1 (set number: 70372) and Combo NEXO Powers Wave 2 (set number: 70373). Two Battle Packs were released including Accessory Set (set number: 853676) and Stone Monsters Accessory Set (set number: 853677). In addition, Nexo Knights: Build Your Own Adventure parts (set number: 11913) polybag set was released as a promotion.

==== Season 4 sets ====
In 2017, the eight sets was released on 1 August 2017 and based on the fourth season. The eight sets being released were The Heligoyle (set number: 70353), Axl's Rumble Maker (set number: 70354), Aaron's Rock Climber (set number: 70355), The Stone Colossus of Ultimate Destruction (set number: 70356), Knighton Castle (set number: 70357), Aaron's Stone Destroyer (set number: 70358), Lance vs. Lightning (set number: 70359) and Macy's Bot Drop Dragon (set number: 70361). Also, five Battle Suit sets were released including Battle Suit Clay (set number: 70362), Battle Suit Macy (set number: 70363), Battle Suit Aaron (set number: 70364), Battle Suit Axl (set number: 70365) and Battle Suit Lance (set number: 70366). In addition, five polybag sets were released as a promotions including Knighton Rider (set number: 30376), Motor Horse (set number: 30377), Shrunken Headquarters (set number: 30378), Crafting Kit (set number: 5004911) and Armour Pod (set number: 5004914).

==== Season 5 sets ====
In 2018, the six sets was released on 2 January 2018 based on the fifth season. The six sets being released were Lance's Hover Jouster (set number: 72001), Twinfector (set number: 72002), Berserker Bomber (set number: 72003), Tech Wizard Showdown (set number: 72004), Aaron's X-bow (set number: 72005) and Axl's Rolling Arsenal (set number: 72006). The designers intended the series to act as a thematic replacement for the popular Lego Castle theme, featuring many of the same elements. Most of the sets were designed primarily for children aged 7+.

==== Unreleased set ====
In July 2020, Lego Nexo Knights Executive Producer Tommy Andreasen shared a hand-drawn concept sketch for an unreleased set and explained, "The Catapoultry! Designed by Axl. Nexo Knights vehicle idea that never happened," and continued, "This was for year three … after Axl would become vegetarian after his ordeal inside the Colossus."

=== Reception ===
In 2016, Lego Nexo Knights won the Editor's Choice award. In July 2016, Jestro's Volcano Lair (set number: 70323) was listed as one of Lego's top seven items for Christmas. In August 2016, General Magmar Siege Machine of Doom (set number: 70321) was listed on a list of top ten toys for Christmas 2016 by Amazon. In September 2016, The Lego Group reported that the Lego City, Lego Star Wars, Lego Ninjago and Lego Nexo Knights themes had delivered a turnover of DKK 15,692 million in the first half of 2016, a sales increase of 10 per cent compared with the same period in the previous year.

Former LEGO CEO Bali Padda called Nexo Knights a success, though it was not as successful as the company intended the IP to be. According to Padda, "We could have executed the digital piece a lot better than we did, so it's learning from that [in the future]."

=== Awards and nominations ===
In 2016, General Magmar's Siege Machine of Doom (set number: 70321) was awarded "DreamToys" in the Action Station category by the Toy Retailers Association.

== Other media ==
=== Video game and app ===
==== Lego NEXO Knights: Merlok 2.0 ====
Lego NEXO Knights: Merlok 2.0
- Developer: Frima Studio
- Publisher: The Lego Group
- Platforms: iOS, Android
- Release: December 19, 2015

Lego NEXO Knights: Merlok 2.0 was a discontinued action battle mobile game that was released for Android and iOS on December 19, 2015. It was developed by Frima Studio for The Lego Group. The game was based on the Nexo Knights television series. Players were trained to fight and win battles to collect memory bits. The app also used the mobile device's camera to scan QR codes on Lego products, such as web pages, books, toys, and the TV series, to unlock new skills.

==== Lego Worlds (2017) ====
The crossover Lego-themed sandbox game Lego Worlds developed by Traveller's Tales and published by Warner Bros. Interactive Entertainment. Lego Worlds was released on 7 March 2017 for Microsoft Windows, PlayStation 4 and Xbox One. A version for Nintendo Switch was released on 5 September 2017 in North America and 8 September 2017 in Europe. It includes Clay, Macy, Lance, Aaron and Axl as playable characters.

=== Attractions ===
Lego Nexo Knights: The Book of Creativity was a 12-minute 4D film that debuted at Legoland Windsor Resort in May 2016. It was also rolled out to other Legoland parks and Legoland Discovery Centres. The plot involves the Nexo Knights fighting Jestro and the Book of Monsters when they attack the village of Buildburg so that the Book of Monsters can consume the Book of Creativity.

=== Publications ===
In 2016, a Lego Nexo Knights magazine aimed at children aged 7–11 and published by Intermediate Media was launched from January 2016 to accompany the toy line.

Several books were also released about the Lego Nexo Knights. A book titled Lego Nexo Knights: The Book of Monsters features different evil spellbooks, the Book of Monsters' crush on the Book of Love, the bios of the Nexo Knights with vandalized pictures, the bios of the Lava Monster Army, the bios of the Forest Monster Army, and the bios of the Sea Monster Army. On May 26, 2016, DK released Lego Nexo Knights: The Book of Knights, which included an exclusive Merlok the Magician minifigure. On September 27, 2016, Scholastic released Lego Nexo Knights: The Knights Code, a guidebook for knights-in-training. On January 31, 2017, Scholastic released Knights Academy: The Forbidden Power, a Nexo Knights spin-off book series following Fletcher Bowman, an orphan from the countryside, and Izzy Richmond, little sister to Lance Richmond, on their adventures at the Knights Academy. On July 25, 2017, DK Books released Lego Nexo Knights Character Encyclopedia, which included an exclusive Clay minifigure.

== See also ==
- Bionicle
- Lego Ninjago
- Lego Legends of Chima
- Lego Monkie Kid
- Lego Legacy: Heroes Unboxed
- Lego Dreamzzz
