= E. J. Altbacker =

American screenwriter

- Born: Ernest Jerome Altbacker; Tulsa, Oklahoma, U.S.
- Education: University of Notre Dame
- Occupation: Writer
- Writing career
- Genres: Children's book Television

Ernest Jerome Altbacker (known as E. J. Altbacker) is a screenwriter who has worked on television shows including Static Shock, Ben 10, Spider-Man, Jay Jay the Jet Plane, Mucha Lucha, and Green Lantern: The Animated Series. He holds an MFA in screenwriting from the American Film Institute and an undergraduate degree from the University of Notre Dame. He has also written a series of six books for children, Shark Wars, published by Razorbill, an imprint of Penguin.

== Publications ==
- Altbacker, E. J. Shark Wars. New York: Brazzaville, 2011. ISBN 9781595143761

== Screenwriting credits ==
- series head writer denoted in bold

=== Television ===
- Extreme Ghostbusters (1997)
- Spider-Man: The Animated Series (1997)
- Heavy Gear: The Animated Series (2002)
- Static Shock (2003)
- ¡Mucha Lucha! (2003)
- Jay Jay the Jet Plane (2005)
- Combo Niños (2008)
- Ben 10: Ultimate Alien (2010–2011)
- Rekkit Rabbit (2011)
- Green Lantern: The Animated Series (2011–2013)
- Monsuno (2013)
- Spooksville (2013–2014)
- Nexo Knights (2016–2017)
- Justice League Action (2017)
- Niko and the Sword of Light (2017–2018)
- Legend Quest (2017, 2019)
- Lost in Oz (2018)
- Cannon Busters (2019)

=== Films ===
- Angel on Abbey Street (1999)
- Scooby-Doo! and WWE: Curse of the Speed Demon (2016)
- Justice League Dark (2017)
- Teen Titans: The Judas Contract (2017)
- Batman: Hush (2019)
- DC Showcase: The Phantom Stranger (2020)
- Justice League Dark: Apokolips War (2020)
- Injustice (2021)
- Green Lantern: Beware My Power (2022)
- Aztec Batman: Clash of Empires (2025)
