= List of programmes broadcast by Boomerang (British and Irish TV channel) =

This is a list of television programs broadcast by Boomerang in the UK and Ireland.

== Current programming ==
=== Acquired programming ===
==== Acquired from Warner Bros. Animation ====
- Be Cool, Scooby-Doo! (5 October 2015 – 2023; 2024–present)
- Scooby-Doo and Guess Who? (7 October 2019–present)
- Scooby-Doo: Mystery Incorporated (6 September 2010 – 2021; 2022–2023; 2025–present)

==== International co-productions ====
- Baby Lemmings (2026–present)
- Grizzy & the Lemmings (10 October 2016–present)
- Moley (4 October 2021 – present)

==== Other ====
- Dino Ranch: Island Explorers (14 Sept 2026–present)
- Mr. Bean: The Animated Series (2011–present)
- Mush-Mush & The Mushables (1 March 2021 – 1 March 2022; 2022–present)

== Former programming ==
- The 13 Ghosts of Scooby-Doo
- The Addams Family
- The Addams Family
- The Adventures of Puss in Boots
- The Amazing Adrenalini Brothers
- The Amazing World of Gumball
- Animaniacs (original)
- Atom Ant
- Baby Looney Tunes
- The Banana Splits
- Bananas in Pyjamas
- Best Ed
- Ben 10 (2016) (23 September 2017 – 2017; 2021–2023)
- The Biskitts
- Blue Water High
- The Boss Baby: Back in Business (2 March 2020 – 2 April 2021; 2022)
- Bugs & Daffy
- Bunnicula
- Camp Lazlo
- Captain Caveman and the Teen Angels
- Casper's Scare School
- Challenge of the GoBots
- The Charlie Brown and Snoopy Show
- Chowder
- Cow and Chicken
- Count Duckula
- The Cramp Twins (November 2012–August 2014)
- Danger Mouse
- Dastardly and Muttley in Their Flying Machines
- Dexter's Laboratory
- Dink, the Little Dinosaur
- Doraemon
- Dorothy and the Wizard of Oz
- DreamWorks Dragons
- Droopy
- Duck Dodgers
- Dynomutt, Dog Wonder
- Fangface
- The Flintstones
- Foster's Home for Imaginary Friends
- Fraggle Rock
- Frankenstein Jr. and The Impossibles
- Gadget Boy
- Galaxy Goof-Ups
- Garfield and Friends
- The Garfield Show (2 November 2009 – 1 July 2019)
- The Gary Coleman Show
- George of the Jungle (2007) (2 June 2015– 2020)
- Great Grape Ape
- Firehouse Tales
- The Happos Family
- Help!... It's the Hair Bear Bunch!
- Heyyy, It's the King!
- The Hillbilly Bears
- Hong Kong Phooey
- Huckleberry Hound
- Inch High, Private Eye
- Inspector Gadget (1983)
- Inspector Gadget (2015)
- Jabberjaw
- Jelly Jamm
- The Jetsons
- Johnny Bravo
- Jonny Quest
- Josie and the Pussycats
- Josie and the Pussycats in Outer Space
- The Jungle Bunch
- King Arthur's Disasters
- Kingdom Force
- Krypto the Superdog
- Laff-A-Lympics
- Lamput (2020 – 2022; 2025–2026)
- The Land Before Time
- The Latest Buzz
- LazyTown
- Lego Monkie Kid (4 February 2023 – 2024)
- Life with Derek
- Looney Tunes (2000-2026)
- Looney Tunes Cartoons (7 June–6 September 2021; 1 November 2021–31 January 2022; 2022–2026), (formerly also on ITV2 and CITV)
- The Magic Roundabout
- Magilla Gorilla
- Make Shake & Jake
- Masha and the Bear
- Master Moley by Royal Invitation (TV special)
- Mighty Mike
- Moomin
- Mr. Bean (live action), (2012-2016)
- My Little Pony: Friendship Is Magic
- My Spy Family
- The New Scooby-Doo Mysteries
- The New Yogi Bear Show
- Ninjago: Masters of Spinjitzu (2022–2024)
- Ninjago: Dragons Rising (2024–2026)
- Oddbods
- The Owl & Co
- The Perils of Penelope Pitstop
- The Pink Panther
- Pink Panther and Pals
- The Pink Panther Show
- Pat the Dog
- Pixie and Dixie
- Popeye
- Pororo the Little Penguin
- Pound Puppies (1986)
- Pound Puppies (2010)
- The Powerpuff Girls (original)
- The Powerpuff Girls (2016 reboot)
- Puppy in My Pocket: Adventures in Pocketville
- Quick Draw McGraw
- The Raccoons
- Roobarb and Custard
- Scooby-Doo and Scrappy-Doo (1979)
- Scooby-Doo and Scrappy-Doo (1980)
- The Scooby-Doo Show
- Scooby-Doo, Where Are You!
- Shaggy & Scooby-Doo Get a Clue!
- Secret Squirrel
- Sitting Ducks
- Skatoony
- The Smurfs
- Snorks
- Sonic Boom
- Space Ghost
- Spaced Out
- The Sylvester & Tweety Mysteries (2000–2018; 3 June 2024 – 2025)
- Staraoke
- Strawberry Shortcake's Berry Bitty Adventures
- Taffy (7 January 2019 – 2022), (now on CBBC)
- Talking Tom & Friends
- The Tex Avery Show
- Thunderbirds
- Tiny Toon Adventures
- Tiny Toons Looniversity (15 April 2024 – 2026)
- Toad & Friends (2024–2026)
- Tom & Jerry Kids
- Top Cat
- Touché Turtle and Dum Dum
- Wacky Races (original)
- Wacky Races (2017)
- Wally Gator
- Yabba-Dabba Dinosaurs
- Yogi Bear
- Yogi's Gang
- Yogi's Space Race
- Yogi's Treasure Hunt
- The ZhuZhus
