= Mobile technology =

Technology used for cellular communication

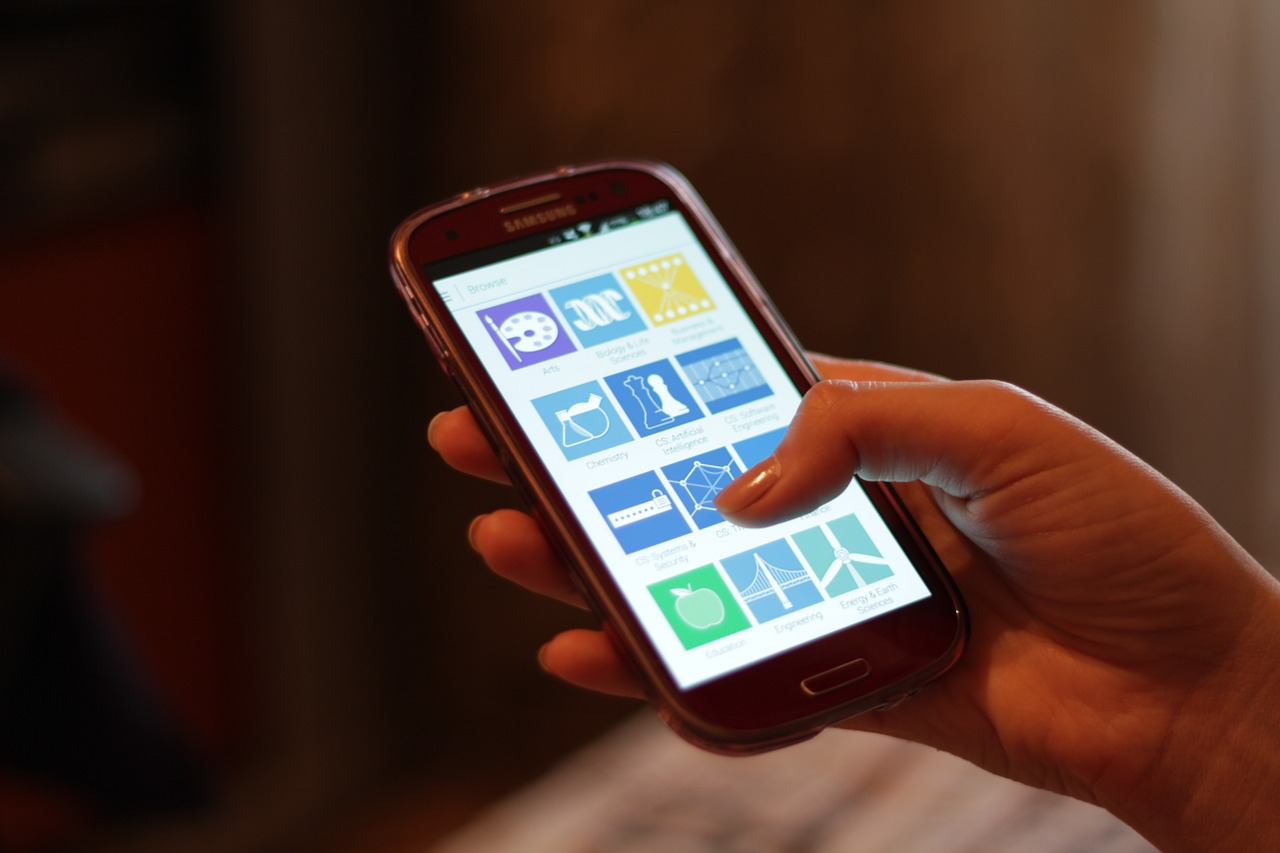
Smartphones serve as an example of the ubiquity of mobile technology in the 21st century.

Mobile technology is the technology used for cellular communication. Mobile technology has evolved rapidly over the past few years. Since the start of this millennium, a standard mobile device has gone from being no more than a simple two-way pager to being a mobile phone, GPS navigation device, an embedded web browser and instant messaging client, and a handheld gaming console. Many experts believe that the future of computer technology rests in mobile computing with wireless networking. Mobile computing by way of tablet computers is becoming more popular. Tablets are available on the 3G and 4G networks.

== Mobile communication convergence ==
Nikola Tesla laid the theoretical foundation for wireless communication in 1890. Guglielmo Marconi, known as the father of radio, first transmitted wireless signals two miles away in 1894. Mobile technology gave human society great change. The use of mobile technology in government departments can also be traced back to World War I. In recent years, the integration of mobile communication technology and information technology has made mobile technology the focus of industry attention. With the integration of mobile communication and mobile computing technology, mobile technology has gradually matured, and the mobile interaction brought by the application and development of mobile technology has provided online connection and communication for Ubiquitous Computing and Any time, anywhere Liaison and information exchange provide possibilities, provide new opportunities and challenges for mobile work, and promote further changes in social and organizational forms.

The integration of information technology and communication technology is bringing great changes to social life. Mobile technology and the Internet have become the main driving forces for the development of information and communication technologies. Through the use of high-coverage mobile communication networks, high-speed wireless networks, and various types of mobile information terminals, the use of mobile technologies has opened up a vast space for mobile interaction. It has also become a popular way of living and working.

Due to the attractiveness of mobile interaction and the rapid development of new technologies, mobile information terminals, and wireless networks will be no less than the scale and impact of computers and networks in the future. The development of mobile government and mobile commerce has provided new opportunities for further improving the level of city management, improving the level and efficiency of public services, and building a more responsive, efficient, transparent, and responsible government. It also helps to bridge the digital divide and provide citizens with universal Service, agile service. The integration and development of information and communication technology have spurred the formation of an information society and a knowledge society and have also led to a user-oriented innovation oriented to a knowledge society, user-centered society, a stage of social practice, and a feature of mass innovation, joint innovation, and open innovation. Shape, innovation 2.0 mode is gradually emerging to the attention of the scientific community and society.

== Mobile communication industry ==
0G: An early cellular mobile phone technology emerged in the 1970s. At this time, although briefcase-type mobile phones have appeared, they still generally need to be installed in a car or truck.

- PTT: Push to talk
- MTS: Mobile Telephone System
- IMTS: Improved Mobile Telephone Service
- AMTS: Advanced Mobile Telephone System
- 0.5G: A group of technologies improving basic 0G technical characteristics.
- Autotel / PALM: Autotel or PALM (Public Automated Land Mobile)
- ARP: Autoradiopuhelin, Car Radio Phone

1G: Refers to the first generation of wireless telephone technology, namely cellular portable wireless telephone. Introduced in the 1980s are analog cellular portable radiotelephone standards.

- NMT: Nordic Mobile Telephone
- AMPS: Advanced Mobile Phone System
- TACS: Total Access Communication System (TACS: Total Access Communication System) is the European version of AMPS
- JTACS: Japan Total Access Communication System

2G: Second-generation wireless telephone based on digital technology. 2G networks are only for voice communications, except that some standards can also use SMS messages as a form of data transmission.

- GSM: Global System for Mobile Communications
- iDEN: Integrated Digital Enhanced Network
- D-AMPS: Digital Advanced Mobile Phone System based on TDMA
- cdmaOne: Code Division Multiple Access defined by IS-95
- PDC: Personal Digital Cellular
- TDMA: Time Division Multiple Access

2.5G: A set of transition technologies between 2G and 3G wireless technologies. In addition to voice, it involves digital communication technologies that support E-mail and simple Web browsing.

- GPRS: General Packet Radio Service
- WiDEN: Wideband Integrated Dispatch Enhanced Network

2.75G: refers to a technology that, although it does not meet 3G requirements, plays a role in 3G in the market.

- CDMA2000 1xRTT: CDMA-2000 is a TIA standard (IS-2000) evolved from cdmaOne. Compared with 3G, CDMA2000 supporting 1xRTT has lower requirements.
- EDGE: Enhanced Data rates for GSM Evolution

3G: Representing the third generation of wireless communication technology, it supports broadband voice, data, and multimedia communication technologies in wireless networks.

- W-CDMA: Wideband Code Division Multiple Access
- UMTS: Universal Mobile Telecommunications System
- FOMA: Freedom of Mobile Multimedia Access
- CDMA2000 1xEV: More advanced than CDMA2000, it supports 1xEV technology and can meet 3G requirements.
- TD-SCDMA: Time Division-Synchronous Code Division Multiple Access

3.5G: Generally refers to a technology that goes beyond the development of comprehensive 3G wireless and mobile technologies.

- HSDPA: High-Speed Downlink Packet Access

3.75G: A technology that goes beyond the development of comprehensive 3G wireless and mobile technologies.

- HSUPA: High-Speed Uplink Packet Access

4G: Named for high-speed mobile wireless communications technology and designed to enable new data services and interactive TV services in mobile networks.

5G: Aims to improve upon 4G, offering lower response times (lower latency) and higher data transfer speeds

== Mobile phone generations ==
In the early 1980s, 1G was introduced as voice-only communication via "brick phones". Later in 1991, the development of 2G introduced Short Message Service (SMS) and Multimedia Messaging Service (MMS) capabilities, allowing picture messages to be sent and received between phones. In 1998, 3G was introduced to provide faster data-transmission speeds to support video calling and internet access. 4G was released in 2008 to support more demanding services such as gaming services, HD mobile TV, video conferencing, and 3D TV. 5G technology was initially released in 2019, but is still only available in certain areas.

=== 4G networking ===
4G is the current mainstream cellular service offered to cell phone users, performance roughly 10 times faster than 3G service. One of the most important features in the 4G mobile networks is the domination of high-speed packet transmissions or burst traffic in the channels. The same codes used in the 2G-3G networks are applied to 4G mobile or wireless networks, the detection of very short bursts will be a serious problem due to their very poor partial correlation properties.

=== 5G networking ===
5G's performance goals are high data rates, reduced latency, energy savings, reduced costs, increased system capacity and large-scale device connectivity. 5G is still a fairly new type of networking and is still being spread across nations. It is planned for 5G to older protocols. Corporations such as AT&T, Verizon, and Telstra are rolling out 5G across the world. According to the GSM Association, by 2025, approximately 1.7 billion subscribers will have a subscription with 5G service.

5G wireless signals are transmitted through large numbers of small cell stations located in places like light poles or building roofs. In the past, 4G networking had to rely on large cell towers in order to transmit signals over large distances. With the introduction of 5G networking, it is imperative that small cell stations are used because the millimeter wave spectrum, which is the specific type of band used in 5G services, strictly travels over short distances. If the distances between cell stations were longer, signals may suffer from interference from inclement weather, or other objects such as houses, buildings, trees, and much more.

In 5G networking, there are 3 main kinds of 5G: low-band, mid-band, and high-band. Low-band frequencies operate below 2 GHz, mid-band frequencies operate between 2–10 GHz, and high-band frequencies operate between 20 and 100 GHz. Verizon have seen outrageous numbers on their high-band 5G service, which they call "Ultra Wideband", which hit speeds of over 3 Gbit/s.

The main advantage of 5G networks is that the data transmission rate is much higher than the previous cellular network, up to 10 Gbit/s, which is faster than the current wired Internet and 100 times faster than the previous 4G LTE cellular network. Another advantage is lower network latency (faster response time), less than 1 millisecond, and 4G is 30-70 milliseconds.

1. The peak rate needs to reach the Gbit/s standard to meet the high data volume of high-definition video, virtual reality and so on.
2. The air interface delay level needs to be around 1ms, which meets real-time applications such as autonomous driving and telemedicine.
3. Large network capacity, providing the connection capacity of 100 billion devices to meet IoT communication.
4. The spectrum efficiency is 10 times higher than LTE.
5. With continuous wide area coverage and high mobility, the user experience rate reaches 100 Mbit/s.
6. The flow density and the number of connections are greatly increased.

Since 5G is a relatively new type of service, only phones which are newly released or are upcoming can support 5G service. Some of these phones include the iPhone 12/13; select Samsung devices such as the S21 series, Note series, Flip/Fold series, A series; Google Pixel 4a/5; and a few more devices from other manufacturers. The first ever 5G smartphone, the Samsung Galaxy S20, was released by Samsung in March 2020. Following the release of Samsung's S20 series, Apple was able to integrate 5G compatibility into their iPhone 12s, which was released in fall 2020. These 5G phones were able to harness the power of 5G capability and gave consumers access to speeds that were rapid enough for high demand streaming and gaming. Another type of cellular device that is being utilized is the 5G hotspot. For people who have a device that is only Wi-Fi-capable, these 5G hotspots would provide strong performance when they don't have access to home Wi-Fi.

== Operating systems ==
The Operating System (OS) is the program that manages all applications in a computer and is often considered the most important software. In order for a computer to run, applications make requests to the OS through an application programming interface (API), and users are able to interact with the OS through a command line or graphical user interface, often with a keyboard and mouse or by touch. A computer that is without an operating system serves no purpose as it will not be able to operate and run tasks effectively. Since the OS manages the computer's hardware and software resources, without it the computer will not be able to communicate applications and hardware connected to the computer.

When someone purchases a computer, the operating system is already preloaded. The most common types of operating systems are Microsoft Windows, Apple macOS, Linux, Android, and Apple's iOS. A majority of the modern-day operating systems use a GUI or Graphical User Interface. A GUI allows the user to perform specific tasks, such as using a mouse to click on icons, buttons, and menus. It also allows for graphics and texts to be displayed to be seen clearly.

In 1985 Microsoft created the Windows operating system, the most popular operating system worldwide. As of October 2021, the most recent version of Windows is Windows 10. Some of the past ones were Windows 7, 8, and 10. In most computers, Windows comes preloaded. According to the Medium, "Windows achieved its popularity by targeting everyday average users, who are not mainly concerned by the optimal robustness and security of their machines, but are more focused on the usability, familiarity, and availability of productivity tools."

Another popular operating system is Apple's Mac OS X. macOS and Microsoft Windows are head-to-head in the competition considering that they are both commonly used. Apple also offers a mobile operating system called iOS. This OS is used exclusively for iPhones, one of the most popular phones on the market. These devices are regularly updated since there are often new features. According to The Verge, "Many users appreciate the unique user interface with touch gestures and the ease of use that iOS offers."

When looking at mobile tech and computers, their operating systems differ entirely since they are developed for different users. Unlike mobile operating systems, computer systems are way more complex because they store more data. Additionally, the 2 have a different user interface, and since computer operating systems have been around longer than phones, they are more commonly used. Another significant difference is that mobile phones do not offer a desktop feature like most computers. Considering the interface of mobile devices that sets them apart from the computers is that they are simpler to use.

Many types of mobile operating systems (OS) are available for smartphones, including Android, BlackBerry OS, webOS, iOS, Symbian, Windows Mobile Professional (touch screen), Windows Mobile Standard (non-touch screen), and Bada. The most popular are the Apple iPhone, and the newest: Android. Android, a mobile OS developed by Google, is the first completely open-source mobile OS, meaning that it is free to any cell phone mobile network.

Since 2008 customizable OSs allow the user to download apps like games, GPS, utilities, and other tools. Users can also create their own apps and publish them, e.g. to Apple's App Store. The Palm Pre using webOS has functionality over the Internet and can support Internet-based programming languages such as Cascading Style Sheets (CSS), HTML, and JavaScript. The Research In Motion (RIM) BlackBerry is a smartphone with a multimedia player and third-party software installation. The Windows Mobile Professional Smartphones (Pocket PC or Windows Mobile PDA) are like personal digital assistants (PDA) and have touchscreen abilities. The Windows Mobile Standard does not have a touch screen but uses a trackball, touchpad, or rockers.

== Channel hogging and file sharing ==
There will be a hit to file sharing, the normal web surfer would want to look at a new web page every minute or so at 100 kbit/s a page loads quickly. Because of the changes to the security of wireless networks users will be unable to do huge file transfers because service providers want to reduce channel use. AT&T claimed that they would ban any of their users that they caught using peer-to-peer (P2P) file sharing applications on their 3G network. It then became apparent that it would keep any of their users from using their iTunes programs. The users would then be forced to find a Wi-Fi hotspot to be able to download files. The limits of wireless networking will not be cured by 4G, as there are too many fundamental differences between wireless networking and other means of Internet access. If wireless vendors do not realize these differences and bandwidth limits, future wireless customers will find themselves disappointed and the market may suffer setbacks.

== Mobile Internet Technology ==
Mobile Internet emerged from the development of PC Internet in the form of handheld, portable devices. The combination of mobile communication and the Internet has allowed users to have easier access in going online if they have mobile technologies such as smartphones, tablets, and laptops amongst the most popular. It is a general term for activities in which the technology, platforms, business models, and applications of the Internet are combined with mobile communications technology.

=== Medical applications ===
The current medical industry has started to incorporate new emerging technologies such as online medical treatment, online appointments, telemedicine cooperation and online payment to their practices. An increase of hospitals and clinics have started implementing electronic health records (EHR) systems to help manage their patients' big data over traditional paper file records. Electronic health records are patients' records and information stored digitally and can be accessed online by exclusively authorized personnel.

From the patient's perspective:

1. The word-of-mouth evaluation of various hospitals and physicians will be clear at a glance on the Internet. When people see the doctor, they can immediately evaluate the doctor and let everyone know.
2. The user's illness big data will be stored permanently with the electronic medical record until the end of life.
3. In the future, the Internet of Things world will network all your information. When did you eat what meals, when did you do something, and the calories consumed that day were all uploaded to the cloud. The doctor can more accurately determine the condition based on your regular diet.
4. More often, patients can choose not to seek medical treatment in a hospital, and based on the reliability of big data, they can directly solve it remotely.

The continuous evolution of technology allows relevant medical services and treatments to grow to be more effective and personable with medical technology. With the advancements in 3D medical technology, the opportunities of efficient, customizable healthcare such as medicine and surgeries are becoming increasingly achievable. Technology has been pioneering the world and experts are determined to find the optimal applications of technology in the medical field to make customizable healthcare affordable, cost-efficient, and practical. Experts have begun to study and apply 3D technology to surgical procedures, where surgeons and surgeons-in-training have started using 3D-printed, physical simulations to navigate cranial surgeries with the use of the patients' data.

=== M-commerce ===
Mobile e-commerce can provide users with the services, applications, information and entertainment they need anytime, anywhere. Purchasing and using goods and services have become more convenient with the introduction of a mobile terminal. Not to mention, websites have started to adopt various forms of mobile payments. The mobile payment platform not only supports various bank cards for online payment, but also supports various terminal operations such as mobile phones and telephones, which meets the needs of online consumers in pursuit of personalization and diversification.

Due to the COVID-19 pandemic, the usage of m-commerce has skyrocketed in popular retail stores such as Amazon, 7-Eleven, and other large retailers. Shopping online has made a lot more stores accessible and convenient for customers, as long as these applications are designed to be straightforward and simple. Poor UI/UX design is a big factor in deterring customers from completing their purchases and/or navigating through online websites. Customers highly value their time and therefore seek practices that can reduce the time spent in stores, which also apply to online applications and websites.

Many in-person stores have also started to use contactless and digital payments to reduce the usual amount of face-to-face interactions with the newly improved convenience digital technology provides. Amazon Go is a newly implemented, highly technical store that allows customers to shop while skipping the checkout process. With the use of enhanced technology, Amazon Go can calculate the total cost of the items that were selected and put into the customer's "virtual" baskets. As long as customers had some form of payment linked to their Amazon accounts, they would be able to leave the store without having to go through the checkout process because it would be automatically paid upon exit. As more and more customers rely on virtual online transactions, the increasing need for security and Internet access will be extremely important.

=== Augmented Reality (AR) ===
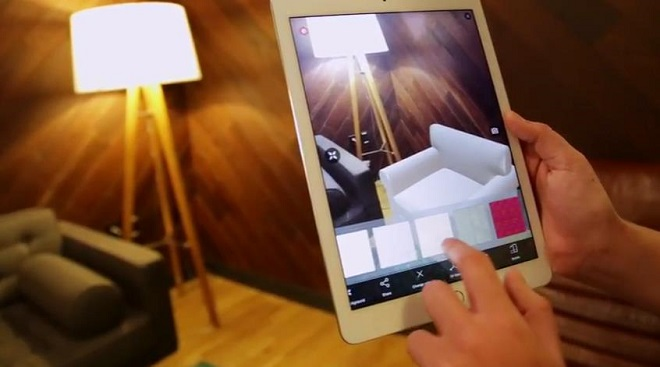
Augmented reality gives customers the ability to preview items before they finalize their products.

Augmented reality is also known as "mixed reality'' and uses computer technology to apply virtual information to the real world. It uses computer technology to apply virtual information to the real world. The real environment and virtual objects are superimposed on the same screen or space in real time. Augmented reality provides information that, in general, differs from what humans can perceive. It not only displays real-world information, but also displays virtual information at the same time, and the two kinds of information complement each other.

According to the data gathered by PSFK Research, customers highly value their time. 72% of the customers want faster and efficient checkout times with the help of technology whereas 61% of customers want efficient technology that helps them find their items faster. Retailers and businesses have implemented augmented reality to help them efficiently manage their storage and more flexible schedules due to remote work. Having the visualization of objects such as clothes, make-up, and shoes will allow users a better, curated shopping experience which can improve the process of checking-out and reducing the amount of time spent in the store.

== Impacts on the modern family ==
Increasing mobile technology use has changed how the modern family interacts with one another through technology. With the rise of mobile devices, families are becoming increasingly "on-the-move", and spend less time in physical contact with one another. However, this trend does not mean that families are no longer interacting with each other, but rather have evolved into a more digitized variant. A study has shown that the modern family actually learns better with usage of mobile media, and children are more willing to cooperate with their parents via a digital medium than a more direct approach. For example, family members can share information from articles or online videos via mobile devices and thus stay connected with one another during a busy day. Family members can also use video chatting platforms to stay in touch even when they are physically not around. This can be taken one step further by looking at applications that offer features such as photo sharing between families as well as providing life updates through statuses and pictures. Examples of these applications include Google Photos, Facebook, Instagram, and Twitter. Aside from these, there are also finance management and e-book applications that provide the collaboration feature for family members. This feature is important because even when a family may be in the same household, lifestyle related tasks are easier to manage when they are the tip of your fingers.

While the world has become more digitalized. mobile technology has played its parts in keeping up with the times. This is also evident through several mobile applications that have been created in order to increase communication between those who live in the same household and even those who may be far. It is no surprise that the reliance on mobile technology has increased but to be able to positively maneuver through this fast-paced change is what is necessary in this day and age. The future indicates that the world will only increase its dependency on technology and as mobile companies offer upgraded devices, the appeal to stay mobile will only grow. Forbes speaks on this behalf as they collect predictions from nine tech experts who share what the future looks like in terms of smartphones. Before beginning, Forbes states, "The members of Forbes Technology Council have their finger on the pulse of upcoming technology advances, including those in the smartphone market." Forbes outlines that there will be more diverse interfaces that will feel more natural and easy to use. Increased interaction with voice assistants will also be offered that will make users more comfortable with assistants such as Alexa, Cortana, and other such artificial intelligence. It is clear that mobile technology is the future of our world - and it will only be more integrated within family members and their day to day communication.

This trend is not without controversy, however. Many parents of elementary school-age children express concern and sometimes disapproval of heavy mobile technology use. Parents may feel that excessive usage of such technologies distracts children from "un-plugged" bonding experiences, and many express safety concerns about children using mobile media. While parents may have many concerns are, they are not necessarily anti-technology. In fact, many parents express approval of mobile technology usage if their children can learn something from the session. for example, through art or music tutorials on YouTube. Rikuya Hosokawa and Toshiki Katsura speak on this regard in their article, Association between mobile technology use and child adjustment in early elementary school age" in which they declare how the positive or negative effects of mobile technology depend entirely on its context and use. The authors offer studies that illustrate that even where there is positive development of cognitive and academic skills via increased technological time, there are much more negative effects on a child's social and psychological development which can include anything from reduced face to face interaction for children to affecting a child's sleep and behavior.

In family life, this technological invention has caused positive and negative effects of equal measure. While others may view this gadget as having eased communication among people and families, some researchers have proved otherwise. These gadgets have strengthened family units. For example, families compensate for daily stress through text messages, phone calls, and e-mails. Internet-enabled phones have also assisted in the connection through social sites where family members can discuss their issues even if they are far apart (Alamenciak, 2012). In America, for instance, parents have adjusted to modern technology thus increasing their connection with their children who may be working in different states. Cell phones are bringing families together as they increase the quality of communication among the family members are living separately in the distance. Families use cell phones to get in touch with their children by the use of e-mails and web (George, 2008). These families contact their children to know how they're doing and entertain them in the process. Moreover, cell phone communication brings families more closely increasing the relationship between family members. During this time, family heads promote values and set good examples to their children. They encourage openness and communication in case problems arise in the family as well as security since family members get the opportunity to know each other well. Also, cell phones have enhanced accountability either in working premises or at homes. People keep in touch with their co-workers and employees as well as their family members (Good Connection, Bad Example: Cell Phones and The Family, 2007).

== Future of smartphones ==
Foldable smartphones

Context awareness is an active area of research into the future of smartphones: using a phone's growing range of embedded sensors to infer what the user is doing and where, and to adapt to it. Some of this is already available: visual search apps such as Google Lens can identify a famous building when the phone's camera is pointed at it. As phones carry more sensors, privacy is often a concern, because sensor data can reveal personal and sensitive information about users, such as their health, behavior and demographics. Smartphones are also expected to play a growing part in health care, both in clinics and outside them. Average smartphone prices have been rising, driven largely by demand for premium models; in 2025 the research firm Counterpoint forecast that the global average selling price would rise from $357 in 2024 to $412 by 2029.

Researchers have also built prototypes of new ways to use mobile devices. OmniTouch, for example, was a wearable prototype, developed in 2011 at Carnegie Mellon University and Microsoft Research, that projected interactive interfaces onto everyday surfaces such as a hand, arm, wall or desk. A projector and depth camera worn on the shoulder let the user operate it by touching the projected surface with a finger, with no other controls.

=== Computing power ===
Throughout the last decade smartphone SoCs (systems on a chip) have gained speed to catch up to desktop-class CPUs and GPUs. Modern smartphones are capable of performing similar tasks compared to computers. Smartphone SoCs may soon be powerful enough to replace computer chips for the most part in the consumer market. Things like Samsung's many DeX products showcase the drive to replace PC components with cheaper counterparts.

=== 6G Connectivity ===
Some people have proposed that 6G connectivity would bring about holographic, virtual reality, autonomous driving, etc. Theoretically suggested to be ten times the speed of 5G.

=== Smartphone metamorphosis ===
Smartphone companies try to blend form and function for optimal value for customers. Where some companies have come out with radical designs that totally change the norm of a phone design. Like the Samsung Galaxy Fold for example, which was a foldable phone that had a bendable screen. This was a prototype when it debuted but with three iterations and other companies adopting the design. With the new design, the retail price experienced a hike but soon as there will be more competition, prices will follow the market. The flexible screen technology gives opportunities to new design opportunities. The screen size has also played a big role in the smartphone industry as it has allowed companies to pack more tech into the body as well cater towards the high demand for big-screen smartphones. The first popular touchscreen smartphone which was the first iPhone Apple introduced in 2007 had a screen size of approximately 3.5". That has almost doubled to 6.7" for Apple's lineup of smartphones, while other companies have even crossed the size of 7".

=== Borderless technology ===
Borderless phones lack bezels, allowing the screen to be larger. Loading a larger screen into a limited phone size can increase one-handed operability, aesthetics, and a sense of technology.

However, the technical problems faced by borderless, light leakage on the screen, accidental touch on the edges, and more fragile bare screens have all been obstacles to the popularization of this technology.

=== Transparent phone ===
Transparent phone is a mobile phone that uses replaceable glass to achieve a visual penetration effect so that its appearance is transparent. Transparent mobile phones use special switchable glass technology. Once the electrically controlled glass is activated by a current through a transparent wire, these molecules will rearrange to form text, icons and other images.

=== Chip phone ===
The idea is that a cell phone can be made directly at the chip level and implanted in the body. Cell phones are used as brain-assisting tools to help improve work efficiency and sensory experience.

== Mobile technology classification ==
Mobile technology, driven by the convergence of mobile communication technology and mobile computing technology, mainly includes four types of technologies.

1. radio-based two-way radio communication (professional or public mobile radio) or broadcast
2. mobile phone service based on cellular phones, SMS (Short Message Service), WAP (Wireless Application Protocol), GPRS (General Packet Radio Service), UMTS (3G, 3rd Generation Mobile Communication Network)
3. mobile-based, including laptops, tablets, PDAs (personal digital assistants), pagers, Bluetooth technology, RFID (radio frequency identification) and GPS (Global Positioning System)
4. network-based Wi-Fi or WAPI wireless LAN that China is developing.
