= Mobile radio telephone =

Pre-cellular mobile telephone systems

A mobile radio telephone installed inside a 1959 Ford Fairlane automobile

Mobile radio telephones or radiophones (sometimes retroactively referred to as pre-cellular or zero generation, that is, 0G) were early forms of mobile telephony systems that preceded modern cellular networks and phones. These networks consisted of a single high-power radio tower geographically covering a city or wider open region, with the tower itself connected to the global telephone network (i.e. PSTN). The phones on the user-end were overwhelmingly car phones but portable briefcase phones also existed.

The first such networks were launched in 1946 by Bell System using Western Electric and Motorola equipment. The earliest commercial telephone systems like the American Mobile Telephone Service (MTS) and German A-Netz used push-to-talk (PTT) means. As radio technology improved, later systems from the 1960s like Improved Mobile Telephone Service (IMTS) were full duplex, meaning the radio would seamlessly send and receive data at the same time.

Mobile radio telephones were made redundant during the 1980s when first-generation cellular networks were built which utilize a "honeycomb grid"-like infrastructure of localized towers, significantly increasing network capacity.

== Explanation and usage ==
These early mobile telephone systems can be distinguished from earlier closed radiotelephone systems in that they were available as a commercial service that was part of the public switched telephone network, with their own telephone numbers, rather than part of a closed network such as a police radio or taxi dispatching system.

These mobile telephones were usually mounted in cars or trucks (thus called car phones), although portable briefcase models were also made. Typically, the transceiver (transmitter-receiver) was mounted in the vehicle trunk and attached to the "head" (dial, display, and handset) mounted near the driver seat. They were sold through WCCs (wireline common carriers, or telephone companies), RCCs (Radio Common Carriers), and two-way radio dealers.

They operated usually on the UHF or VHF band between 35 MHz and 450 MHz.

== History and former networks ==
=== United States and Canada ===
A "briefcase phone" for the MTS network, showing here the handset and cradle, possibly 1950s

The mobile radio telephone service originated with the Bell System and was first used in St. Louis, Missouri, on June 17, 1946. On October 2, 1946, Motorola communications equipment carried the first calls on Illinois Bell Telephone Company's new car radiotelephone service in Chicago. Due to the small number of radio frequencies available, the service quickly reached capacity. The Bell Telephone Company of Canada launched the mobile telephone service simultaneously in Toronto and Montreal in June 1947.

In 1964 AT&T introduced the Improved Mobile Telephone Service (IMTS). This was the first automatic system offering automatic dialing to and from the mobile. More licenses were added, bringing the total to 32 channels across three bands (See IMTS frequencies). This service was used at least into the 1980s in large portions of North America.

Parallel to IMTS a competing mobile telephone technology was called Radio Common Carrier (RCC). The service was provided from the 1960s until the 1980s and used paired UHF 454/459 MHz and VHF 152/158 MHz frequencies near those used by IMTS. These systems operated in a regulated environment in competition with the Bell System's MTS and IMTS.

In 1968, almost 22 years after the initial network, the US government started to consider reserving spectrum for land mobile radio communication, to be used by private persons. The FCC initiated proceedings which resulted in the reservation of 75 MHz of spectrum in 1970. During the 1970s the FCC changed its mind a few times, such as in 1974 when it reduced the spectrum to 40 MHz.

On May 4, 1981 the FCC released the rules for providing commercial cellular service. Over the next few years the FCC received hundreds of applications for 90 markets. The first cellular (AMPS) system went live on October 13, 1983 in the Chicago market. It served only hard-wired, non-portable units in vehicles. Over 5,000 subscribers signed up by early 1984.

In Canada, Autotel was launched in 1983 as a new 0G system specifically for some of its dense regions with wilderness. This is because the emerging cellular networks were unpractical and expensive to cover remote parts of the country. Autotel offered automated roaming and direct-dialing while using the older high-power VHF radio infrastructure.

=== Netherlands ===
The Netherlands launched the first mobile phone network outside the US and Canada, in 1949. The Openbaar Landelijk Net (OLM) was operated by the state-owned Der Posterijen Telegrafie en Telefonie Staatsbedrijf (PTT, now the private KPN) and used the 80 MHz band. This was on the lower end of the FM radio broadcast band, meaning it was easy to eavesdrop. Because of the Dutch geography, only 22 base stations were necessary to be constructed for wide coverage, although this increased a few years later to 35. During the 1970s, its maximum capacity of 2,500 subscribers was reached. In 1980, the fully automatically-switched ATF-1 network began operating which was based on the German B-Netz, which also allowed compatibility in bordering West Germany as well as Luxembourg. The ATF-1 network switched off in 1995 as it was superseded by 1G ATF-2 and 2G GSM.

=== West Germany ===
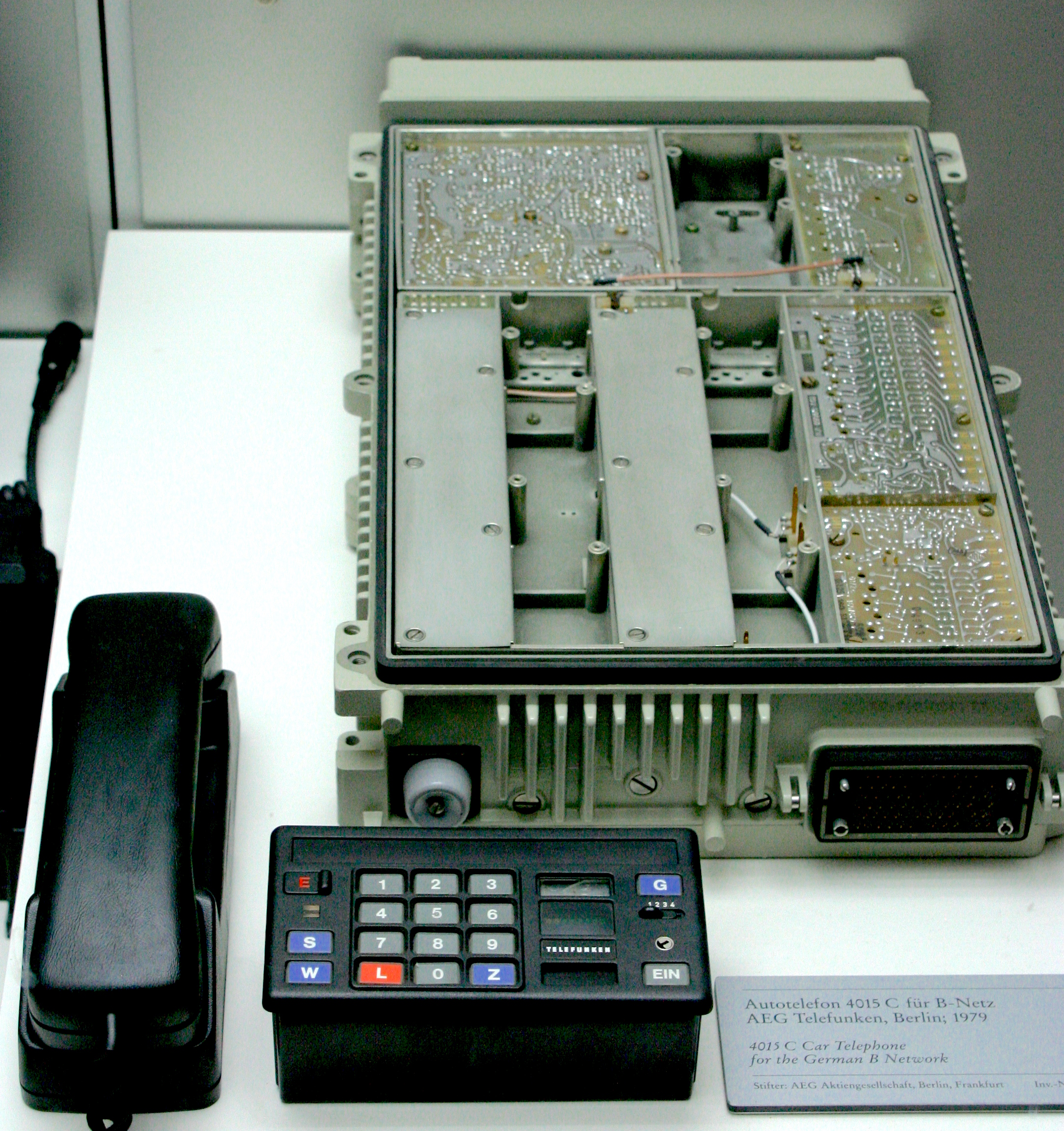
An AEG-Telefunken car phone from c. 1979, built for the German B-Netz network

The A-Netz (Netz being German for network) launched in 1952 at the earliest in West Germany as the country's first public commercial mobile phone network. It operated on the 156 MHz and 174 MHz spectrum and had 17 operator switched channels (for A1-Netz, later expanded). By the late 1960s it achieved 80% geographic coverage. The capacity limit of approximately 11,000 users was reached by 1971 and was succeeded by the B-Netz in 1972, which featured direct dialing rather than a human operator to connect calls. However, in order to reach a subscriber, one would still need to know their location since the handset would assume the local area code of the base station serving it. The B-Netz was succeeded in 1985 by the C-Netz 1G cellular system.

=== France ===
France deployed a radio telephone system around 1955 named R150, operating at 150 MHz in the radio spectrum. The second system, R450, launched in 1973 with automatic dialing. Both were superseded by the hybrid 1G cellular system Radiocom 2000.

=== Sweden ===
Sweden started relatively early with plans for mobile telephony service trials at the end of the 1940s. At the end of the 1950s, a trial system was built, using two channels, providing service for five mobile stations. In 1956, two commercial systems were brought online, each equipped with four channels. It was called Mobiltelefonisystem A. There were 125 subscribers by the end of the 1960s, when the network was shut down and replaced by Mobiltelefonisystem B. Then in 1971 the Mobiltelefonisystem D network launched that operated until the late 1980s by which time cellular Nordic Mobile Telephone (NMT) was rolled out across the country.

=== Great Britain ===
System 1, launched in 1959 by the General Post Office as the 'Post Office South Lancashire Radiophone Service', covering South Lancashire and operated from a telephone exchange in Manchester, is cited as Britain's first mobile phone network. However, it was manual (needed to be connected via an operator) and for several decades exercised very little coverage. The service launched in the London region in 1965 and covered much of the country in the 1970s when System 3 was launched. Automatic dialing finally arrived with System 4 in the early 1980s before the launch of 1G TACS cellular networks in 1985. As of the late 1970s, there were about 6,000 subscribers nationwide of the radio telephone service with half of them in London.

=== Finland ===
The Autoradiopuhelin (ARP) launched in 1971 in Finland as the country's first public commercial mobile phone network. A manual system, it operated on the 150 MHz frequency band and was highly successful in subscriber numbers (35,000 at its peak) as well as achieving a 100% geographic coverage rate by the late 1970s. The service was terminated in approximately 2000, superseded by 1G NMT and 2G GSM.

=== East Germany and Mexico ===
In 1979, East Germany developed an analog radio phone network called URTES-Netz (UHF-Radio-Telefonie-System network). Gottfried Schuppang is the individual credited for leading the development. The system was not used in East Germany because the Stasi feared it would not have control over the communications, but it was installed in a number of other countries, including Mexico, Algeria and Mozambique. The only time URTES-Netz was used in Germany was following the collapse of the East German state, when it was deployed in an attempt to bridge the gap caused by a lack of fixed network telephone capacity. However, the West German C-Netz was quickly extended to the east and the digital 2G D-Netz was also built in eastern Germany from 1992 onward.

The URTES-Netz system in Mexico was built in 1981 using equipment produced in East Germany. It had a maximum capacity of 120 stations. The call signs used during testing were Blaumeise (blue tit) followed by a number. Most stations were installed at fixed locations in rural areas. However, one station was reportedly installed by request of the governor of Guerrero, Alejandro Cervantes Delgado in his car, making it the first and possibly only car phone in the network. A prototype of that telephone was briefly shown in a TV report about the development of the URTES network.

=== Other countries ===
The "Altai" mobile telephone system launched into experimental service in 1963 in the Soviet Union, becoming fully operational in 1965; the first automatic mobile phone system in Europe.

Televerket opened its first manual mobile telephone system in Norway in 1966. Norway was later the first country in Europe to get an automatic mobile telephone system.

The Advanced Mobile Telephone System launched in Japan in the 1960s.

Mobile telephony began in Spain in 1976 under the name Teléfono Automático en Vehículos (TAV, meaning "automatic telephone for vehicles"). From the beginning, it was a fully automated, direct-dial network that ran on the 150 MHz band.

The Automatizovaný městský radiotelefon (AMR) launched in 1978, fully operational in 1983, in Czechoslovakia as the first analog mobile radio telephone in the whole Eastern Bloc.

== See also ==
- Walkie-talkie
- List of mobile phone generations
- 1G
- Mobile rig
- Mobile Telephone Service – a pre-cellular VHF radio system that linked to the PSTN
- Radiotelephone – a communications device for transmission of speech over radio
- Satellite telephone

Preceded by -	Mobile Telephony Generations	Succeeded by 1G
