= Altai (mobile telephone system) =

Radiotelephone service in the Soviet Union

The Altai mobile telephone system is the pre-cellular 0G radiotelephone service that was first introduced in the Soviet Union in 1963, and became available in most large cities by 1965. It is a fully automated UHF/VHF network that allows a mobile node to connect to a landline phone, and was originally conceived to serve government officials and emergency services, but has since spread into general use, and is still in use in some places, where its advantages outweigh those of conventional cellular networks. Work on the system of automatic duplex mobile communication started in 1958 in Voronezh Research Institute of Communications (VNIIS, now concern Sozvezdie). It was established subscriber stations and base stations for communicating with them.

== Technical information ==
From the technical standpoint "Altai" was fairly ordinary UHF/VHF trunked radio, but it was equipped with the automatic switching circuits on both mobile and static nodes that allowed the mobile end of the link to generate and transmit dialing signals and to connect the static end to the PSTN. Few initial installations used 150 MHz frequency, but as the network grew the later iterations switched to 330 MHz. Base stations have had up to 22 independent trunks of 8 channels each, and were commonly mounted together with the TV transmitters, sometimes even sharing the HF circuitry. This allowed for good coverage, as there were generally only one base station per city.

== See also ==
- Car phone
- Mobile radio telephone
- Improved Mobile Telephone Service, an American contemporary and counterpart of the "Altai" system
