= AMR radiotelephone network (Czechoslovakia) =

The first analog mobile radio telephone in Czechoslovakia (and in the whole Eastern Bloc) was AMR (sometimes AMRAD), in Czech Automatizovaný městský radiotelefon (Automated Municipal Radiotelephone).

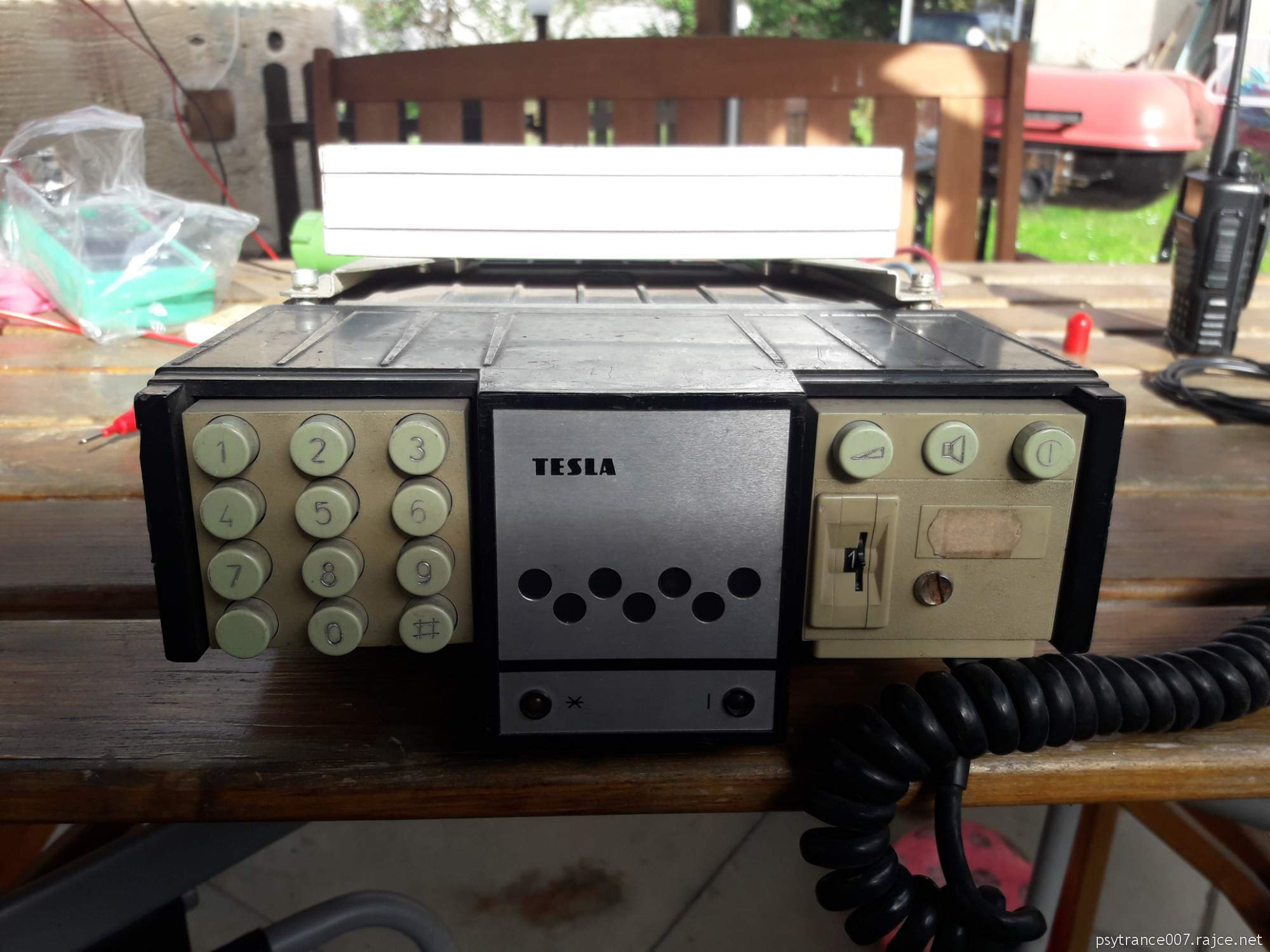
AMR Front panel

The system was developed by the Tesla company in Pardubice in the 1970s. In 1983 it went into operation. At the time it was used mainly for communication between distant employees (typically in telecommunication industry). After 1989 commercial use was allowed and the network stayed until 1999 when it was stopped. The network was owned and operated by state telecom company "SPT Telecom" (later Český Telecom, then Telefónica O2 Czech Republic).

== Technical features ==
- The complete network has 63 base stations and capacity for 9,999 users (4 numbers were used for identification).
- Reach of base station was 15 – 25 km, the radiophones were also able to communicate directly with one another.
- Three frequency bands were used: 162/167 MHz for the experimental network, 161/165 MHz for the country level network and 152/157 MHz for local networks.
- Fixed monthly payment tariff was used, 1000 Kčs per month in 1990, because the system was unable to record call details.
- Authentication of the users was added only in 1993.
- There was no encryption of the transmission and it was possible to listen to the traffic on any tuned receiver (as standard radio).
- The only services provided were incoming and outgoing voice calls within the country.

AMR network was followed by mobile network based on NMT standard (450 MHz, on 12 September 1991, by Eurotel) and a radio-paging service (RDS) in 1992. In 1996 the first network based on GSM standard was started in the Czech Republic.
