= Autotel =

Autotel (also called PALM, or Public Automated Land Mobile) is a radiotelephone service which was the "missing link" between earlier MTS/IMTS and later cellular telephone services. It used digital signaling for supervisory messages (call setup, ringing, channel assignment, etc.), except the voice channel was analog (as was the original NMT and AMPS cellular systems). This system was not cellular, as it used existent high-power (35 watt) VHF channels. This system was developed for rural British Columbia, Canada, where building a network of low-power cellular terminals to cover a forest would have been prohibitively expensive. It reached a peak 10,000 subscribers in British Columbia and was also deployed at least in the Northwest Territories.
