= Sanjay Swamy =

Sanjay Swamy is an Indian technologist and venture capitalist. Sanjay is a mobile technology and payments expert, a managing partner at Prime Venture Partners (www.primevp.in) a seed-stage VC fund based in Bangalore, India. The business has invested in several category-creating startups in the technology space in India, including Ezetap, SmartOwner, HackerEarth, Happay, Synup, KredX and many more.

Previously Sanjay worked with the Government of India's UIDAI. He was the CEO of mobile company mChek, a mobile security and payments solutions company.

== Early life ==
Sanjay Swamy was born in Madras, India. He completed his degree in Electrical & Electronics Engineering at Bangalore University in 1987. He later went to Ecole Nationale Supérieure de l'Aéronautique et de l'Espace and completed a degree in Avionics & Control Systems Engineering in 1989. Later he received his MS from University of Washington, Seattle in 1992.

== Career ==
Sanjay Swamy worked in the US before moving to India in 2004. In that same year, he started building ketera India operations before becoming the CEO of mChek in 2006. Under his leadership mChek signed up several major banks, including ICICI, State Bank of India, Citibank, Visa and mobile telecom carriers AirTel & Tata as partners to bring his service to market. And he helped expand the company's operations to Sri Lanka in a partnership with Dialog.

In 2005, when Kartik Jain was setting up Picsquare, a photo sharing and online photo prints website, with a friend, he turned to Swamy. Sanjay Swamy used his experience and helped Jain in building the product, which is mainly aimed at the NRI community. Swamy also helped them make strategies to bring the product to the market quickly. He worked with mChek for four years before moving to UIDAI in March 2010 where he is working on Mobile Strategy.
