= Soundpocket =

Hong Kong non-profit organisation

Soundpocket (traditional Chinese: 聲音掏腰包; simplified Chinese: 声音掏腰包) is a Hong Kong non-profit organisation that promotes sound art and culture. It was established in 2008 by Yang Yeung.

== History ==
Soundpocket was created in 2008 by Yang Yeung (楊陽). It is a non-profit organisation that works to advance sound art and culture. Centred on sound, Soundpocket host lectures and workshops and release books. Around 2010, the organisation created the Artist Support Programme (藝術家支援計劃) to support artists specialising in sound art.

In March 2013, Soundpocket debuted the website The Library. It features over 150 one-minute field recordings documenting the sounds of modern Hong Kong's daily life. The selected recordings include the chirping of crickets, the steady bustle of a fast-food restaurant's customers, and silence itself. The creators included sound artists and hobbyist sound makers. Other recordings included an interview with Tomy Yu Ka-Luk, who creates sound effects for movies, and a full-day audio capture of the 2013 summer solstice. According to Larissa Hjorth, a media and communications professor at the Royal Melbourne Institute of Technology, and her coauthors, the library's originality lies in how it connects with different audiences through leveraging social media and mobile technology.

== Bibliography ==
- Hjorth, Larissa; Pink, Sarah; Sharp, Kristen; Williams, Linda (2016). Screen Ecologies: Art, Media, and the Environment in the Asia-Pacific Region. Cambridge, Massachusetts: MIT Press. pp. 134–135. ISBN 978-0-262-03456-2 – via Google Books.
- Lai, Linda Chiu-han (February 2020). "Contemporary "Women's Art in Hong Kong" Reframed: Performative Research on the Potentialities of Women Art Makers". Positions: Asia Critique. 28 (1). Duke University Press: 240, 249–250, 269. doi:10.1215/10679847-7913132.
- Martraire, Marie (March 2014). "Website Review". Journal of Curatorial Studies. 1 (1): 151–153. doi:10.1386/jcs.3.1.151_7. ISSN 2045-5836.
- Nakagawa, Katsushi; Kaneko, Tomotaro (2017). "Research on the Development of Sound Art in Asian Countries" (PDF). Tokiwadai Journal of Human Sciences: 80–91. ISSN 2189-3160. Archived from the original (PDF) on 2026-02-01.
