= MobileStorm =

mobileStorm
- Company type: Private
- Industry: Web marketing
- Founded: 1999
- Headquarters: Los Angeles, California
- Key people: Jared Reitzin, Dave Carlson, Jonathan Schreiber
- Number of employees: 50+
- Website: mobileStorm.com

mobileStorm is a SaaS based product for multi-channel communications. Businesses use mobileStorm to build a database of customers and gives them the ability to reach people on smart phones via email, text-message, push notification, secure messages to mobile apps and sites, as well as voice and fax broadcast. The communications firm started by Jared Reitzin is based in Los Angeles, California. To date, the company has sent billions of messages and launched more than a million marketing campaigns. Some of their clients include Overstock.com, NASCAR, American Idol and Kaiser Permanente.

== Company history ==
In 1998, at the age of 19, Reitzin dropped out of college to start a record label called Katalyst Music Group. Within Katalyst, Reitzin started a technology division where they built websites for larger labels. Early in the company’s founding, Jonathan Schreiber, an advisor, inspired Reitzin's interest in mobile technology.

mobileStorm officially launched in 1999 and incorporated in August 2000. They raised $40,000 initially from friends and family and were entirely self-funded.

In 2007, mobileStorm announced an angel round of funding with eonBusiness and opened additional offices in San Francisco and Orange County. The San Francisco branch will focus on new accounts, sales, and customer service. In 2008, mobileStorm was named the email service provider of FreemantleEnterprises, which manages shows like American Idol and The Price Is Right. mobileStorm’s former products include Stun!, which allowed small to medium-sized businesses to build a database of customers and market to them via text messaging, email, voice and fax, and Bolt, a hosted service designed for large enterprises that deployed marketing, customer service, and transactional messaging programs. The two platforms are currently integrated into "mobileStorm for Marketing."
