= Radiocom 2000 =

Radiocom 2000 was a French mobile telephone network launched in 1985, which gradually replaced the earlier analogue "public correspondence" network. It was deployed by France Télécom Mobiles. It is classified in the category of first generation mobile networks (1G).

The network covered almost all mainland France. The subscriptions offered could be regional (Île de France, Lyon Region, Provence-Alpes-Côte d'Azur), Provincial and National. Operating in the vhf frequency band, the network used digital technology for signalling and analogue modulation for voice. Frequencies were dynamically allocated according to needs.

It was with Radiocom 2000 that the first concepts of cellular telephony appeared with, shortly after its launch, the appearance of the handover called "High Density Network" (capacity to change cells dynamically) and the allocation of frequencies within a cell.

Faced with the growing demand of subscribers, several frequency bands were used on the Radiocom 2000 network, in particular the 200 MHz and 160 MHz bands in the Île-de-France, Lyon and Marseille regions as well as the 175 MHz band from 1990 in the north-eastern quarter of France. To meet the demand for additional capacity, from 1990 mobile devices became dual-band 400/900 MHz, developed by Matra, Mobitel, and Sagem as manufacturers. Alcatel and Nokia distributed these same handsets via their respective brands.

Handsets used rechargeable nickel–cadmium batteries. The antenna was smaller than that of a terminal from the early 1980s, but the terminal was still bulky and prohibitively expensive (with a device and subscription rental).

In 1988 it had 60,000 subscribers and more than 90% of the devices were installed on board vehicles. That same year, competition appeared with the birth of the Société française de radiotéléphones (SFR), using the NMT-F (Nordic Mobile Telephone "French") standard.

On 1 October 1998, a shutdown date of 31 December 1998 was confirmed for the Radiocom 2000 network. However, in the end, the shutdown was delayed by one and a half years.

On 28 July 2000, the Radiocom 2000 network and national subscriptions (400 MHz + 900 MHz) were closed in favour of the GSM standard. NMT-F services were also closed that day. The last subscribers to the Radiocom 2000 system were then offered a switch to the new GSM standard, on the Itinéris network of France Télécom.
