= AT&T High Seas Service =

Ship to shore telephone service

The AT&T High Seas Service was a radiotelephone service that provided ship-to-shore telephone calls, which consisted of stations WOO (transmitter station in Ocean Gate, New Jersey (39°55′38″N 74°06′55″W), receiver station in Manahawkin, New Jersey, United States), WOM (Receiver site in Plantation, Florida (26°8′36.09″N 80°11′55.76″W), transmitter on Krome Ave. (25°52′21.57″N 80°29′2.44″W)) and KMI (transmitter station in Dixon, California (38°24′38″N 121°46′38″W), receiver station in Point Reyes, California (38°5′31″N 122°57′20″W)).

== History ==
Before satellite communication systems were widely available, the only way ships at sea had to communicate with the rest of the world was via radio connections to land stations. To talk to people who did not operate radio equipment, a vessel at sea would make contact with a land station, usually using high frequency AM or single-sideband (SSB) radio. The operator of the land station would patch the radio connection through to a telephone call made over the regular telephone system (referred to as a landline). The AT&T High Seas Service was a commercial radio-to-telephone connection system using the above land stations. The charges were typically settled by making the landline connection a collect call. Larger vessels maintained accounts with AT&T, but the service was available to any vessel with a marine HF radio. In the 1980s the radio link was priced at several dollars per minute plus the long distance landline charge from the High Seas station.

Each High Seas station maintained a radio watch on multiple HF radio channels on multiple marine radio bands. Depending on propagation and distance, the ship radio officer would select a likely band and call ("Whisky Oscar Mike, Whisky Oscar Mike, this is Rollick WSP1234 on channel 604") for the High Seas station listening on that available frequency. Then the High Seas radio technician would ask for the location of the ship and select the antenna oriented in the best direction, or advise a better frequency, or even a better-located station to call. Many of the High Seas antennas were fixed Rhombics and the coverage patterns were provided by AT&T to subscribers. While many of the marine HF channels are full duplex (different transmit frequency for ship and ground station), few ships had the radio & antenna capability for duplex operation. Users had to learn to say "over" when done talking and the shipboard radioman would key the transmitter. Since the operator and the whole world could listen in, nothing was private in the conversation.

From the shore of the United States, one could place a call to a ship by dialing 1-800-High-Sea(s) (the corresponding number to the letter (S) was the 12th digit dialed before the pulse train could be completed and sent on the telephone network, so it was ignored by the switch in the central office of the station from which it was dialed). This toll free number led to a High Seas Telephone Operator in the IOC (International Operating Center) in Pittsburgh Pennsylvania, who would answer and take the details of the call, e.g., ship name, the name of the person being called and the name and phone number of the originator of the call. These call details were kept on file and the High Seas Telephone Operator would make a telephone call to the High Seas Radio Station, either WOO (Whiskey Oscar Oscar) in New Jersey or WOM (Whiskey Oscar Mike) in Florida or KMI (Kilo Mike India) in California. The High Seas Telephone Operators would give the High Seas Radio Technician the name of the ship that the party was trying to reach and the High Seas Radio Technicians were responsible to broadcast the traffic list on certain frequencies at regular times so that the Ship's Radio Technician could be notified that his particular ship was being hailed for the completion of a phone call to one of its passengers or crew members. After receiving the call details from the High Seas Radio Technician, the Ship's Radio Technician would make a ship-wide announcement paging the called party on the ship to come to the radio room on the ship to receive their call. When the person arrived in the radio room, the Ship's Radio Technician would hail the High Seas Radio Station on a predetermined frequency and would request a connection to the USA call originator. The High Seas Radio Station Technician would then call the High Seas Telephone Operator in Pittsburgh and request the call's completion. The High Seas Operator would retrieve the call details from the computer and connect the parties together. Since there was no "answer supervision" on these calls, they did not disconnect automatically. The High Seas Telephone Operators would monitor the call approximately every minute to listen for talking. If there was no talking when she or he went in on the line, the High Seas Telephone Operator would then ask the Ship's Radio Technician (who was also listening to the line and checking for call quality) for the next telephone call that he wanted to complete. In all, there were about 5 people on one High Seas Telephone call, which made it a very public exchange.

Amateur radio operators also provided free phone patch links for ships at sea from licensed hams operating ship radio equipment, but only if the message was of a non-commercial nature. For many military and maritime servicepersons, who waited in line for their chance to talk, it was the only affordable way to "call home".

Technical Operator at the KMI High Seas Radio control console in Oakland, California, c. 1966

AT&T shut down all three stations on November 9, 1999.

Ocean Gate Radio, the home of WOO at Good Luck Point, was made into a Wildlife refuge in 2003. In 2012, it was severely damaged by Hurricane Sandy. In 2016–17, most of the abandoned antenna poles were removed, with the remainder kept as platforms for osprey nests.
