= Mobira Cityman 900 =

Cell phone model

- Manufacturer: Nokia-Mobira Company
- Availability by region: 1987
- Compatible networks: NMT 900
- Dimensions: 183×43×79 mm (7.2×1.7×3.1 in)
- Weight: 760 g (27 oz)
- Battery: UL61, 9.6 V, 1000mAh, NiCD
- Display: 8 numbers Monochrome

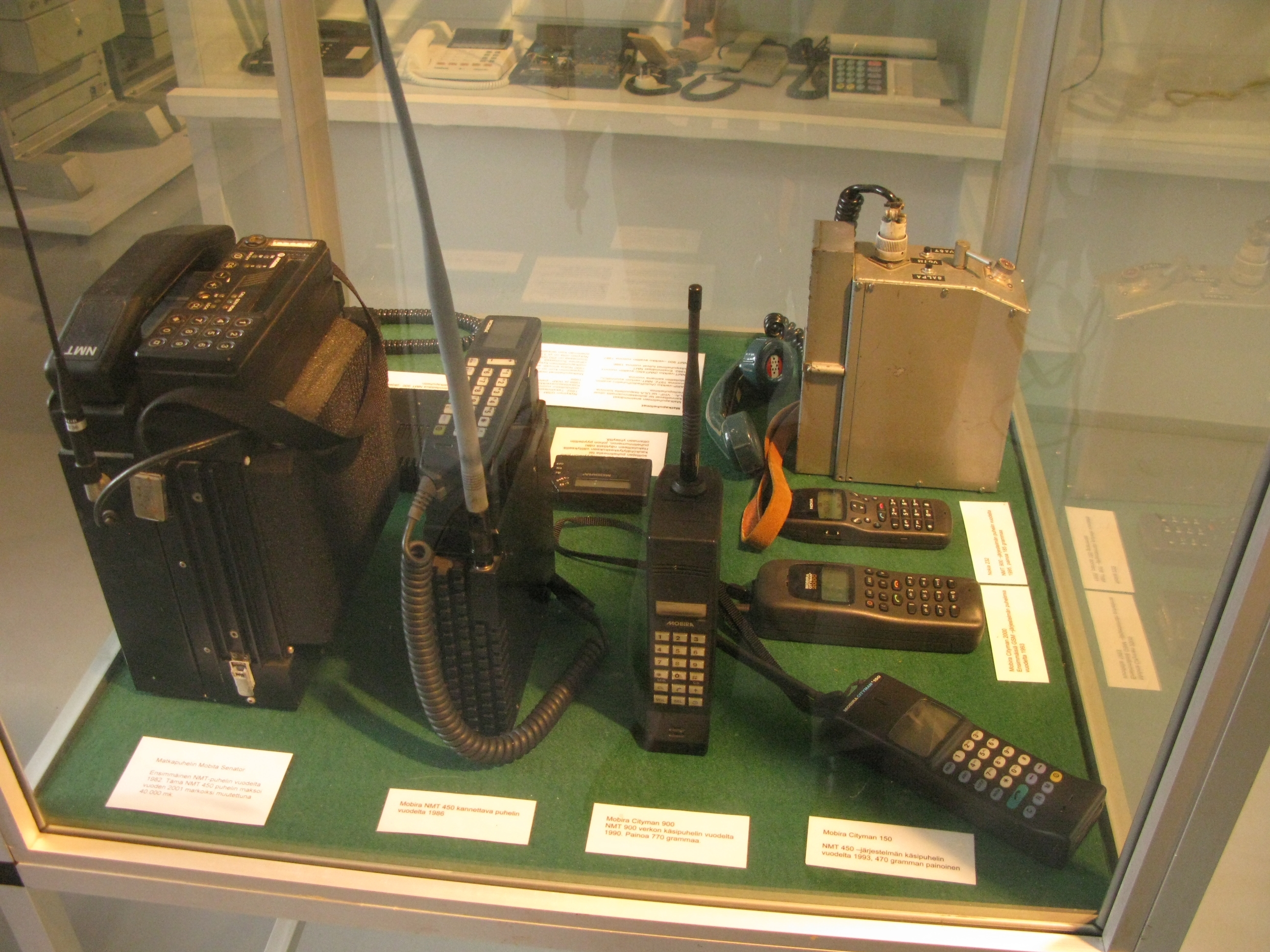
The Cityman 900 is the third phone from the left in the front

The Mobira Cityman 900 was released in 1987 by Nokia-Mobira. It was one of the first handheld cell phones. The nickname of the phone in Finland was Gorba. This was because the President of the Soviet Union Mikhail Gorbachev used a Cityman phone to talk to the Deputy Minister of Communications Vladimir Glinka in Moscow from Helsinki in October 1989. The call was made by the phone's owner Stefan Widomski, a Nokia executive. It is likely that the phone used was an earlier Cityman 450 model.

== Design ==
The Cityman 900 has a total weight of 760 g. The phone measures 183 × 43 × 79 mm.
