= Mobikom =

Bulgarian mobile phone network, 1992–2008

Mobikom is a defunct NMT mobile network in Bulgaria. It existed from 1992 until 2008, although its customer base had drastically fallen in its latter years, since the introduction of GSM.

It was established as a joint venture between Cable & Wireless (49%), Bulgarian Telecommunications Company (39%) and Radioelectronic Systems.

Mobikom originally used the network code 0799, which was later changed to 048, with the customer number increasing from five digits to six.

Mobikom also ran a public payphone service, which was for a time called Mobika (identical logo, except for the spelling).
