= Advanced Mobile Telephone System =

Full-duplex analog mobile radio communication system

The Advanced Mobile Telephone System (not to be confused with Advanced Mobile Phone System) was a zero generation (0G) method of radio communication, launched in 1965 in Japan and mainly was used in Japanese portable radio systems in the 1960s and 1970s. Like its successor, HCMTS, it operated on the 900 MHz band.
