= Radiotelephone =

Communications system for transmission of speech over radio

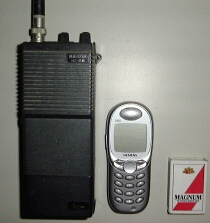
Comparison of an amateur radio handheld transceiver, cell phone, and matchbox (the latter is not a phone)

A radiotelephone (or radiophone), abbreviated RT, refers to a radio communication system for conducting a conversation; radiotelephony means telephony by radio, specifically two-way radio systems for bidirectional person-to-person voice communication between separated users. The term is in contrast to radiotelegraphy, which is radio transmission of telegrams (messages), or television, transmission of moving pictures and sound; the term is also related to radio broadcasting, which transmit audio one way (i.e. downlink) to listeners instead of two-way.

Examples of radiotelephony include: CB radio, walkie-talkies, ham (amateur) radio, marine radio, aviation airband, and mobile radio (car) telephone. The earliest practical example of radiotelephony was the first transcontinental telephone call placed over a microwave relay system between New York and San Francisco. In spite of the name, radiotelephony systems are not necessarily connected to or have anything to do with the telephone network, and in some radio services, including GMRS, interconnection is prohibited.

== Design ==
=== Mode of emission ===
The word phone has a long precedent beginning with early US wired voice systems. The term means voice as opposed to telegraph or Morse code. This would include systems fitting into the category of two-way radio or one-way voice broadcasts such as coastal maritime weather. The term is still popular in the amateur radio community and in US Federal Communications Commission regulations.

=== Modes of operation ===
A standard landline telephone allows both users to talk and listen simultaneously; effectively there are two open communication channels between the two end-to-end users of the system. In a radiotelephone system, this form of working, known as full-duplex, requires a radio system to simultaneously transmit and receive on two separate frequencies, which both wastes bandwidth and presents some technical challenges. It is, however, the most comfortable method of voice communication for users, and it is currently used in cell phones and was used in the former IMTS.

The most common method of working for radiotelephones is half-duplex operation, which allows one person to talk and the other to listen alternately. If a single frequency is used, both parties take turns to transmit on it, known as simplex. Dual-frequency working or duplex splits the communication into two separate frequencies, but only one is used to transmit at a time with the other frequency dedicated to receiving.

The user presses a special switch on the transmitter when they wish to talk—this is called the "press-to-talk" switch or PTT. It is usually fitted on the side of the microphone or other obvious position. Users may use a procedural code-word such as "over" to signal that they have finished transmitting.

== Features ==
Radiotelephones may operate at any frequency where they are licensed to do so, though typically they are used in the various bands between 60 and 900 MHz (25 and 960 MHz in the United States). They may use simple modulation schemes such as AM or FM, or more complex techniques such as digital coding, spread spectrum, and so on. Licensing terms for a given band will usually specify the type of modulation to be used. For example, airband radiotelephones used for air to ground communication between pilots and controllers operates in the VHF band from 118.0 to 136.975 MHz, using amplitude modulation.

Radiotelephone receivers are usually designed to a very high standard, and are usually of the double-conversion superhet design. Likewise, transmitters are carefully designed to avoid unwanted interference and feature power outputs from a few tens of milliwatts to perhaps 50 watts for a mobile unit, up to a couple of hundred watts for a base station. Multiple channels are often provided using a frequency synthesizer.

Receivers usually feature a squelch circuit to cut off the audio output from the receiver when there is no transmission to listen to. This is in contrast to broadcast receivers, which often dispense with this.

=== Privacy and selective calling ===
Often, on a small network system, there are many mobile units and one main base station. This would be typical for police or taxi services for example. To help direct messages to the correct recipients and avoid irrelevant traffic on the network being a distraction to other units, a variety of means have been devised to create addressing systems.

The crudest and oldest of these is called CTCSS, or Continuous Tone-Controlled Squelch System. This consists of superimposing a precise very low frequency tone on the audio signal. Only the receiver tuned to this specific tone turns the signal into audio: this receiver shuts off the audio when the tone is not present or is a different frequency. By assigning a unique frequency to each mobile, private channels can be imposed on a public network. However, this is only a convenience feature—it does not guarantee privacy.

A more commonly used system is called selective calling or Selcall. This also uses audio tones, but these are not restricted to sub-audio tones and are sent as a short burst in sequence. The receiver will be programmed to respond only to a unique set of tones in a precise sequence, and only then will it open the audio circuits for open-channel conversation with the base station. This system is much more versatile than CTCSS, as relatively few tones yield a far greater number of "addresses". In addition, special features (such as broadcast modes and emergency overrides) can be designed in, using special addresses set aside for the purpose. A mobile unit can also broadcast a Selcall sequence with its unique address to the base, so the user can know before the call is picked up which unit is calling. In practice many Selcall systems also have automatic transponding built in, which allows the base station to "interrogate" a mobile even if the operator is not present. Such transponding systems usually have a status code that the user can set to indicate what they are doing. Features like this, while very simple, are one reason why they are very popular with organisations that need to manage a large number of remote mobile units. Selcall is widely used, though is becoming superseded by much more sophisticated digital systems.

== Uses ==
=== Conventional telephone use ===
Mobile radio telephone systems, such as Mobile Telephone Service and Improved Mobile Telephone Service, allowed a mobile unit to have a telephone number allowing access from the general telephone network, although some systems required mobile operators to set up calls to mobile stations. Mobile radio telephone systems before the introduction of cellular telephone services suffered from few usable channels, heavy congestion, and very high operating costs.

=== Marine use ===
The Marine Radiotelephone Service or HF ship-to-shore operates on shortwave radio frequencies, using single-sideband modulation. The usual method is that a ship calls a shore station, and the shore station's marine operator connects the caller to the public switched telephone network. This service is retained for safety reasons, but in practice has been made obsolete by satellite telephones (particularly INMARSAT) and VoIP telephone and email via satellite internet.

Short wave radio is used because it bounces between the ionosphere and the ground, giving a modest 1,000-watt transmitter (the standard power) a worldwide range.

Most shore stations monitor several frequencies. The frequencies with the longest range are usually near 20 MHz, but the ionosphere weather (propagation) can dramatically change which frequencies work best.

Single-sideband (SSB) is used because the short wave bands are crowded with many users, and SSB permits a single voice channel to use a narrower range of radio frequencies (bandwidth) when compared to earlier AM systems. SSB uses about 3.5 kHz, while AM radio uses about 8 kHz, and narrowband (voice or communication-quality) FM uses 9 kHz.

Marine radiotelephone first became common in the 1930s, and was used extensively for communications to ships and aircraft over water. In that time, most long-range aircraft had long-wire antennas that would be let out during a call, and reeled-in afterward. Marine radiotelephony originally used AM mode in the 2–3 MHz region before the transition to SSB and the adoption of various higher frequency bands in addition to the 2 MHz frequencies.

One of the most important uses of marine radiotelephony has been to change ships' itineraries, and to perform other business at sea.

== Regulations ==
In the United States, since the Communications Act of 1934 the Federal Communications Commission (FCC) has issued various commercial "radiotelephone operator" licenses and permits to qualified applicants. These allow them to install, service, and maintain voice-only radio transmitter systems for use on ships and aircraft. (Until deregulation in the 1990s they were also required for commercial domestic radio and television broadcast systems. Because of treaty obligations they are still required for engineers of international shortwave broadcast stations.) The certificate currently issued is the general radiotelephone operator license (GROL).

== See also ==
- Air-ground radiotelephone service
- ASTRA2Connect Maritime Broadband
- AT&T High Seas Service
- Car phone
- Improved Mobile Telephone Service
- Inmarsat
- Mobile radio telephone
- Mobile Telephone Service
- Two-way radio
- Radiotelephony procedure

== Notes ==
- Bruce, Robert V. Bell: Alexander Bell and the Conquest of Solitude. Ithaca, New York: Cornell University Press, 1990. ISBN 0-8014-9691-8.
- Carson, Mary Kay (2007). "8". Alexander Graham Bell: Giving Voice To The World. Sterling Biographies. New York: Sterling Publishing Co., Inc. pp. 76–78. ISBN 978-1-4027-3230-0. OCLC 182527281.
