= 1G =

First-generation mobile telecommunications standard

In mobile telecommunications, 1G (first generation) refers to the analog cellular network systems introduced in the late 1970s. The term was later applied retroactively to distinguish these early cellular network systems from later digital generations.

== History ==
The first commercial cellular network was launched by Nippon Telegraph and Telephone (NTT) in Japan in 1979, initially covering Tokyo. Within five years it expanded nationwide and became the world’s first full-scale cellular system. Earlier, Bell Laboratories tested a network around Chicago in 1978.

The Nordic countries jointly developed the Nordic Mobile Telephone (NMT) standard, first deployed in Sweden in 1981. NMT introduced international roaming, a feature later adopted by other systems. In 1983, Ameritech launched the first 1G network in the United States using the Advanced Mobile Phone System (AMPS) and the Motorola DynaTAC handset.

By the mid-1980s, 1G networks operated across most of Europe, Asia, and the Middle East. Adoption varied: Western Europe and North America expanded rapidly, while Eastern Europe and parts of Africa adopted the technology later due to economic and political limits. Although Japan was the first country with a nationwide cellular network, the number of users was significantly lower than other developed economies with a penetration rate of only 0.15 percent in 1989. As of January 1991, the highest penetration rates for cell phones worldwide were in Sweden and Finland with both countries above 50 percent closely followed by Norway and Iceland. The United States had a rate of 21.2 percent. In most other European countries it was below 10 percent.

== Technology ==
1G introduced the cellular network concept which divided service areas into cells, each served by a low-power transmitter, enabled frequency reuse and higher capacity. Although some parts of the network backbone used digital signaling, voice transmission between handset and base station remained analog, typically using frequency modulation similar to land mobile radio systems.

== Standards ==
Analog cellular standards of the 1G era included:

- Advanced Mobile Phone System (AMPS) – United States and other regions
- Nordic Mobile Telephone (NMT) – Nordic countries and parts of Eastern Europe
- Total Access Communication System (TACS) – United Kingdom and other regions
- C-450 – West Germany, Portugal, and South Africa
- Radiocom 2000 – France, operated by France Télécom
- RTMI – Italy
- MCS-L1 and MCS-L2 – Japan, developed by NTT
- JTACS – Japan, a variant of TACS operated by DDI

== Transition to 2G ==
By the early 1990s, analog 1G systems were replaced by digital GSM and cdmaOne networks, which offered higher capacity, encryption, and text messaging. Most 1G networks were decommissioned by the early 2000s, though some persisted longer in remote or developing regions. The last known operational 1G service, in Russia, closed in 2017.

== See also ==
- List of mobile phone generations
- 2G
- 3G
- 4G
- 4G LTE
- 5G
- 6G
- 6G Melda (Melda is referred to a modern ITU as an advanced Cellular bandwidth than 6G)
