= RTMI =

RTMI (Radio Telefono Mobile Integrato) was the first mobile communication service in Italy, started in 1973. It operated on the 160 MHz frequency band and was used by a few people working in the public sector (public administrations and defense officials). In the 1980s, the Radio Telephone Mobile (RTM) emerged, which operated on the 450 MHz frequency band and attracted 100,000 customers.

The cellular standard RTMS was launched in 1985. In 1989 the SIP (Società Italiana per l'Esercizio delle Telecomunicazioni) adopted the TACS standard. RTMS services were switched off in 1996.
