= Car phone =

Telephone intended to be used in a car

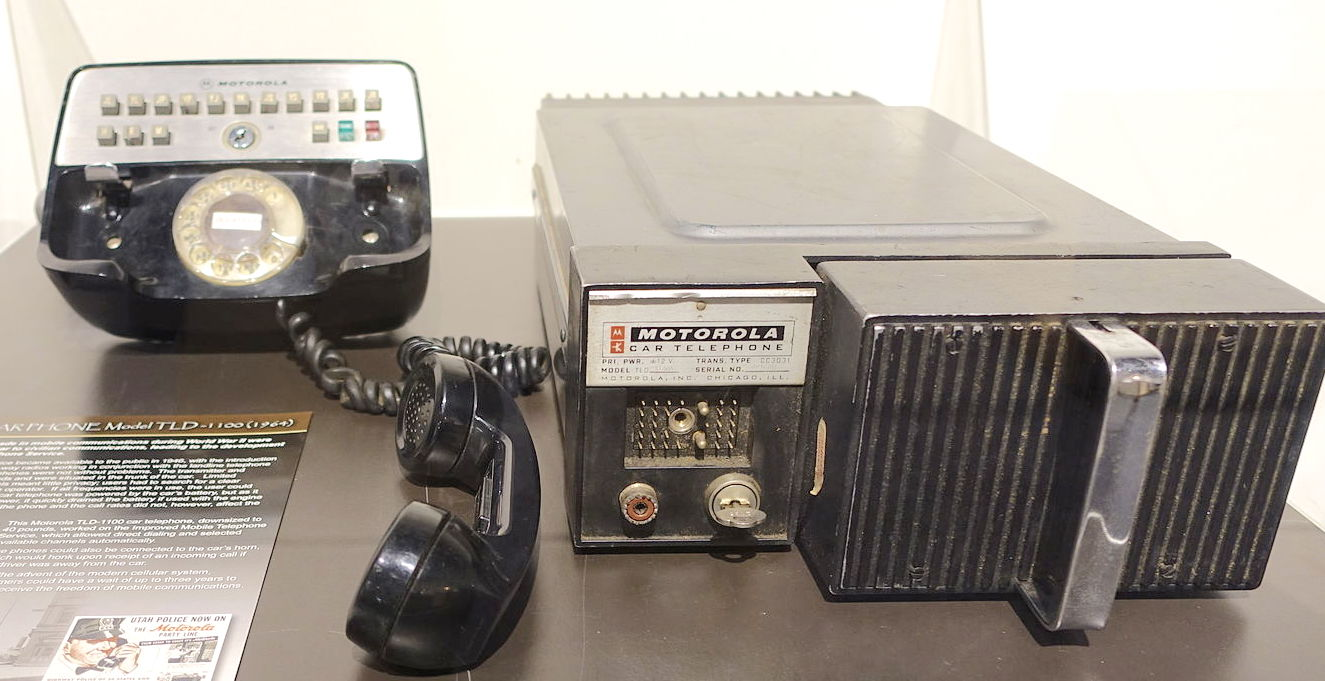
Motorola Car Telephone Model TLD-1100, 1964: on the left are the control panel and handset that are meant to be mounted by the dashboard; on the right is the actual transmission and receiver unit meant to be bolted down in the trunk, connected to the former using cables

A car phone is a telephone specifically designed for and fixed into an automobile. They were the earliest user-end devices for public commercial mobile telephony systems, beginning when the first mobile radio telephone service originated in 1946.

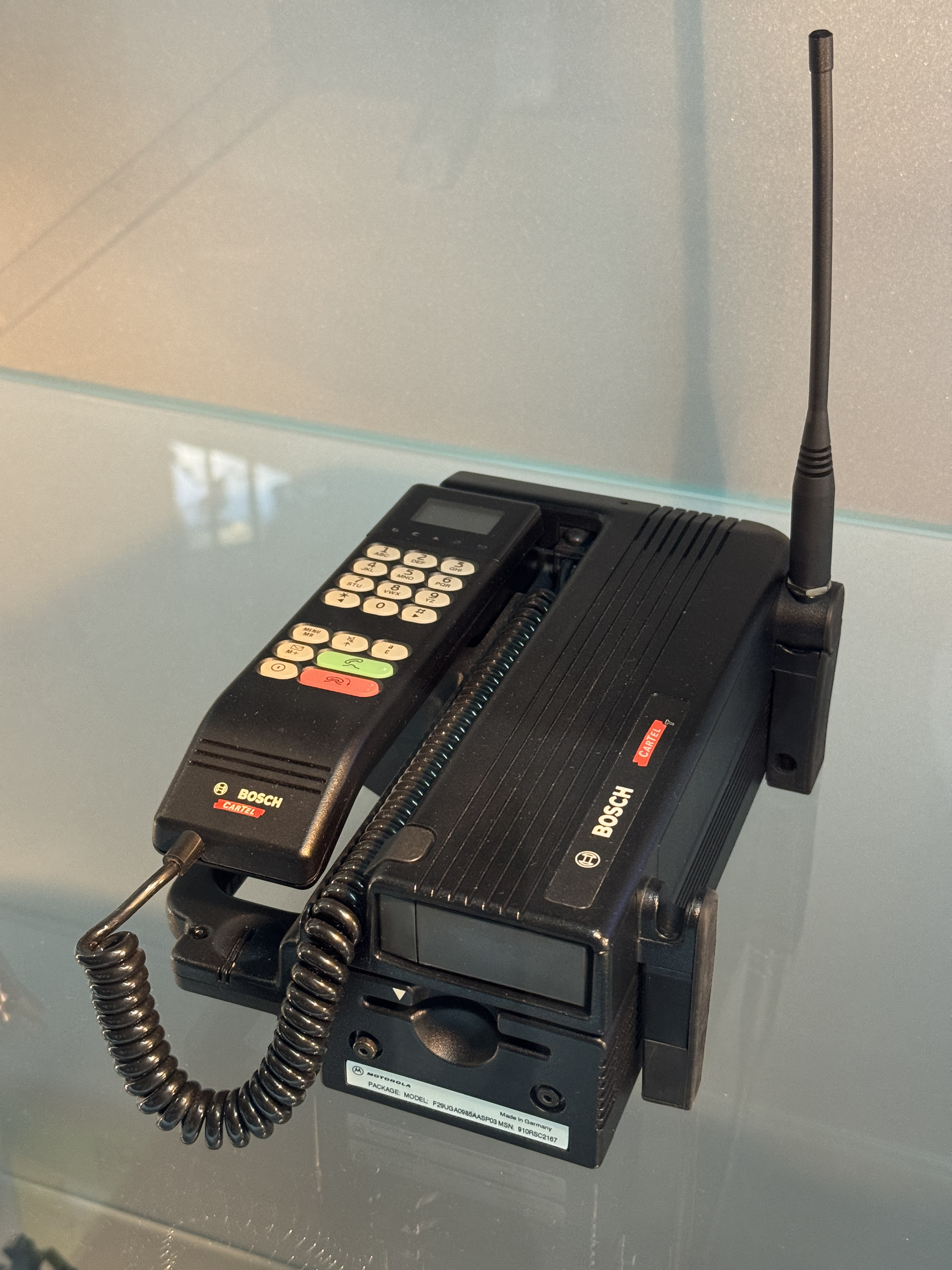
Bosch CarTel cellular "transportable" car phone for the C-Netz network, which could be removed off a car and run on batteries, c. late 1980s

For decades, car phones were trunk units and were luxuriously used by small exclusive groups of individuals, like high-ranking politicians, because of the exorbitant prices of the services. After the deployment and launch of cellular networks (which required significantly less power), car phones were compressed into smaller and integrated single units. They became popular during the latter half of the 1980s as a public status symbol and began being offered by automotive makers in family sedans and limousines in the US.

Car phones remained relevant until approximately 1996. By that time, handheld mobile phones had considerably shrunk in size and weight. Convenient in-car handsfree systems connected to pocket-sized phones using technologies like Bluetooth eventually made car phones redundant.

== History ==
=== Pre-cellular era ===
On June 17, 1946, Western Electric communications equipment carried the first calls on the first radiotelephone service launched in the American city of St. Louis, named Mobile Telephone Service (MTS). Some sources mistakenly claim that Motorola equipment was the first car phone, however this occurred some time later, on October 2, 1946, on Illinois Bell Telephone Company's service in Chicago. The original equipment weighed 80 pounds (36 kg). In North America, car phones typically used the MTS service. The later Improved Mobile Telephone Service (IMTS) service was used at least into the 1980s in large portions of North America.

As mobile radio telephone systems began being built outside the US and Canada after the 1940s, car phones began to appear there too. In West Germany, the A-Netz radiotelephone service was first launched in 1958. The equipment was usually about 16 kilograms (35 pounds), although an early unit built by BBC (Brown, Boveri & Cie) weighed as much as 30 kilograms (66 pounds) because it used glass vacuum tubes rather than transistors.

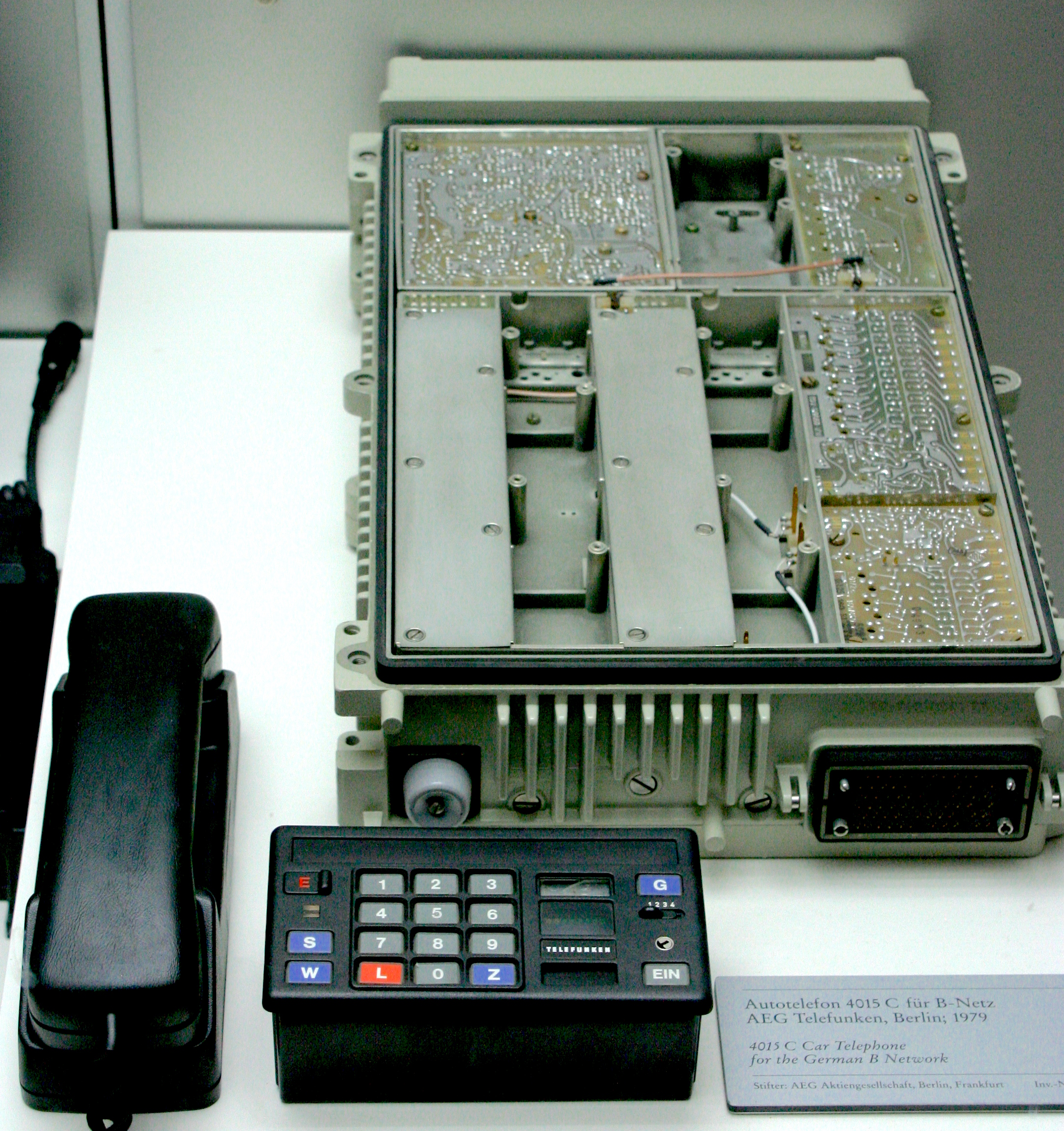
AEG 4015C telephone for the German B network c. 1979; on the bottom and bottom-left are the control head and the handset, and the large long object is the transceiver placed in a trunk

Because early radiophone systems were manual (i.e. used a human switchboard operator as a middleman), the car phones of the time had a push-to-talk (PTT) button that had to be used by users. With later automatic systems, calls were full duplex meaning that both parties in a telephone call could talk and hear each other live, like a regular telephone call. Therefore car phones built for automatic systems no longer needed a PTT button, but budget models continued to be made that required PTT during a call.

=== Cellular era ===
Cellular networks launched in most developed countries in the 1980s, including on October 13, 1983 in the United States. This allowed car phones to be more mobile and lighter due to lower power demand, eliminating the need for heavy-duty metal radio chassis bolted down into the car's trunk. This also gave rise to "transportables", a bridge between car phones and handheld phones. For example the 1986 Motorola 4500X transportable weighed just 9.5 pounds (4.3 kilograms).

In the late 1980s, car phones became a popular status symbol to the extent that a Californian company called Faux Systems sold over 45,000 phony non-functional car phones, complete with glass-mounted exterior antennas, for $16 (equivalent to $44 in 2025) each. Car phones were typically offered by car makers in luxury vehicles. Manufacturers that offered it included Mercedes-Benz, BMW, Lexus and Jaguar. Hardware makers themselves also sold aftermarket car phones for fitting it into other and/or older vehicles.

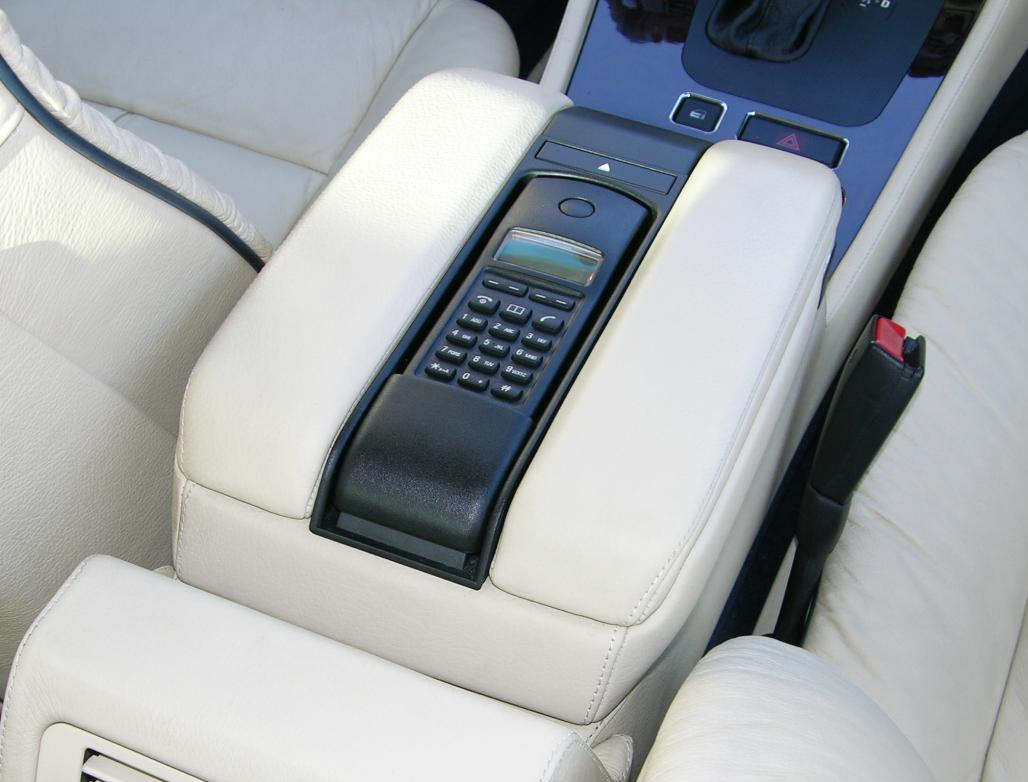
A cellular Motorola car phone in the center console of a 1990s BMW 750iL

Although handheld phones gradually became smaller in the early and mid 1990s, traditional car phones still held an advantage to some users for using a high-power transmitter and car-mounted external antenna, ideal for rural or undeveloped areas where mobile handsets may not work well or at all.

Manufacturers such as Mercedes-Benz and BMW stopped offering factory-equipped fixed car phones in the late 1990s. However, the carmakers continued partnerships with makers of handheld mobile phones to offer them (especially business-oriented ones like Motorola V60 or Nokia 6310) with their executive car models, complemented with a dedicated dashboard with cradle that made the handheld phones act just like a classic car phone when placed on it. Many automobiles have since featured integrated, "hands-free" systems to utilize a consumer's mobile phone, via a Bluetooth wireless link or using an integrated transceiver. The systems use an internally mounted microphone, and the car's audio system, and may feature voice activation and control.

Car phones continued being produced for niche purposes. As recently as 2008, the Nokia 810 was available to buy for use with GSM networks while Motorola provided US customers with the m800 and m900 car phones, for use with CDMA and GSM networks respectively. Satellite car phones have also continued to be made often for military and heavy duty purposes, often also called "vehicle-mounted satellite terminals" or "satellite modems". NAL Research's A3LA for instance is an example of a unit built for the Iridium network containing a trunk box hardwired using D-sub connectors.

== Derivatives ==
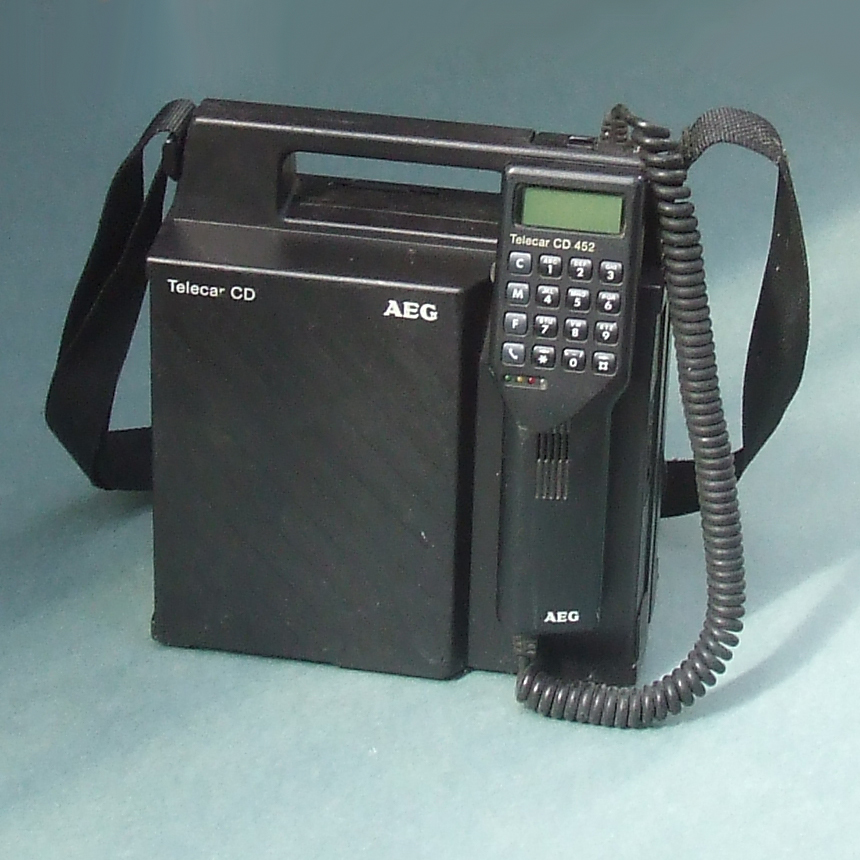
AEG Telecar CD 452, an example of a transportable cell phone, c. 1989

In the cellular era, a derivative of the car phone came out often called "transportable". Rather than being completely fixed to a car, these phones could be detached from the car and used portably, backed by large rechargeable battery packs. Its key advantage over "brick" handheld phones (e.g. Motorola DynaTAC 8000X and Mobira Cityman 900) was stronger signal power for improved reception. Towards the end of the 1980s, transportable phones were refined even further using lighter components and packaging them into a padded canvas or leather bag, often called "bag" phones, the best known example being the Motorola bag phones.

== In popular culture ==
A car phone notably appeared in the 1954 movie Sabrina in which Humphrey Bogart, playing a wealthy corporate titan, picks up a hardwired rotary telephone in his limousine. Bogart himself had one installed in his real-life Chrysler Crown Imperial. A car phone also appears in Goldfinger (1964) inside a secret compartment of James Bond's Aston Martin DB5. In The Chase (1994), Charlie Sheen's character receives a call on what is presumably a car phone in a stolen BMW 325is, then rips and throws the phone out the window.

In the 1960s/1970s detective TV series Mannix and Cannon, both the titular characters often makes use of a car phone inside their vehicles. The car phone serves as a major plot device in the 1991 Seinfeld episode "The Alternate Side" specifically one inside a Saab 900.

Famous individuals including Elvis Presley were known to have installed car phones in their private vehicles. Rappers have made use of car phones under the impression of it being a status symbol of wealth and luxury. LL Cool J also directly references "car phone" in the 1989 song "Big Ole Butt", as does Ice Cube in the opening soundtrack of Friday (1995).

== See also ==
- OnStar, emergency notification system
