= TOPS (Nortel) =

Traffic Operator Position System, a computer-based operator switchboard

TOPS - Traffic Operator Position System is a computerized operator telephone switchboard designed by Bell-Northern Research Labs for the SP-1 4 Wire Switch in the early 1970s and still widely used today by toll and directory-assistance operators. The terminals known as 'TOPS Positions' are usually connected to Nortel DMS-100 and DMS-200 telephone switches.

== Systems ==
Below are some of the different TOPS systems developed:

=== TOPS MP ===
TOPS Multipurpose Position. An earlier-generation operator position for toll and assistance and directory assistance.

=== TOPS - MPX ===
A previous-generation operator position based on industry-standard personal computer customized with Nortel Networks components and interfaces to provide connectivity with IBM directory databases.

=== TOPS ===
Traffic Operator Position System. Nortel Networks' operator services system is based on the DMS TOPS switch.

=== TPC ===
TOPS Position Controller. (Previous generation equipment required for TOPS MP positions) The processing unit provides intelligence and interfaces to the switch for up to four TOPS MP operator positions.

== Technical details ==
The Class 5 switch system for Traffic Operator Position System (TOPS) enables the definition of up to 255 unique queues of calls to operators—and up to 255 unique profiles defining the responsibilities of operators and teams, that is, the queues from which they can draw calls. This technology was first introduced in the DMS 200/300. Previously, only four queues were available, all straight-line models, forecasted with Erlang distribution algorithms and table look-ups. Now, a vast array of queues were available, with variable grades of service, served by multiple queues of operators in both primary and secondary capacity. The lookup tables were no longer capable of forecasting for this complex queueing environment.

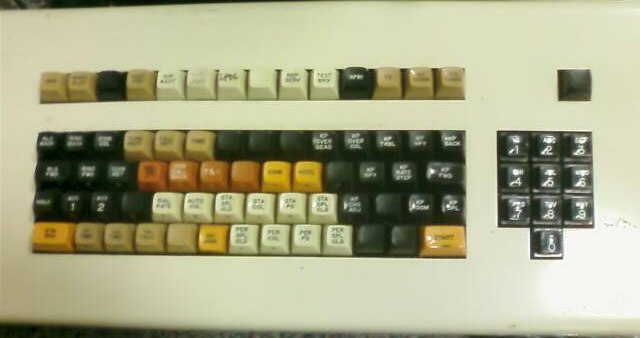
Above: A picture of a keyboard from the Nortel TOPS position (terminal)

== See also ==
- Digital Multiplex System
