= List of wireless network technologies =

Summary of mobile network generations

This article summarizes the main generations of mobile network technology, from early analog radio systems to current digital cellular standards.

Generations of mobile network technologies
Generation	Standards	Core technology	Maximum data rate	Launch year	Notes
0G	Mobile radio telephone	Analog (pre-cellular)	<1 kbit/s	1946	Point-to-point radio without cells
1G	NMT, AMPS, TACS	Analog voice	2.4–9.6 kbit/s	1979	First cellular systems
1.5G	D-AMPS	Hybrid analog/digital	14.4 kbit/s	1990	Transitional between 1G and 2G
2G	GSM, IS-95, IS-136	Digital voice and SMS	64–144 kbit/s	1991	Introduced digital encryption and text messaging
2.5G	GPRS	Packet-switched overlay	56–115 kbit/s	2000	Added packet-switched data to GSM
2.75G	EDGE	8PSK modulation	236 kbit/s	2003	Enhanced GPRS data rates
3G	UMTS, CDMA2000	W-CDMA / CDMA	384 kbit/s–several Mbit/s	1998	Enabled Internet and video services
3.5G	HSDPA, HSUPA	High-speed packet access	14.4 Mbit/s ↓ / 5.8 Mbit/s ↑	2005	Higher capacity and lower latency
3.75G	HSPA+	Enhanced HSPA	42 Mbit/s ↓	2008	Final 3G evolution stage
4G	LTE, WiMAX	All-IP, OFDMA	100 Mbit/s–1 Gbit/s	2009	Broadband Internet and multimedia services
4.5G	LTE-Advanced, LTE-Advanced Pro	Carrier aggregation, MIMO	1–3 Gbit/s	2015	Precursor to 5G
5G	5G NR	Massive MIMO, beamforming	Up to 20 Gbit/s	2019	Low latency, IoT, mmWave spectrum
6G	(under research)	Sub-THz (100 GHz–3 THz)	>1 Tbit/s (target)	~2028	Experimental systems in development

== 0G ==
0G systems did not use cellular networks and are referred to as pre-cellular or zero generation (0G mobile) systems.

== 1G ==
1G refers to the first generation of cellular network technology. These analog telecommunication standards were introduced in 1979 and used until replaced by 2G digital systems. The main distinction was that 1G transmitted voice as analog radio signals, while 2G transmitted all communications digitally.

=== 1.5G ===
1.5G describes transitional systems such as Digital AMPS that combined analog and digital elements.

== 2G ==
2G introduced digital encryption for calls, efficient use of spectrum, and services such as SMS and MMS. The first commercial 2G network, using the GSM standard, was launched in Finland by Radiolinja (now Elisa Oyj) in 1991.

North American standards IS-54 and IS-136 (Digital AMPS) used TDMA with three time slots in each 30 kHz channel, supporting three compressed calls in the same spectrum as one analog call under AMPS. IS-95 (CDMAOne) was the first CDMA-based digital cellular standard, developed by Qualcomm and adopted by the Telecommunications Industry Association in 1995.

=== 2.5G ===
2.5G systems added a packet-switched domain alongside circuit-switched operation, enabling GPRS mobile data.

=== 2.75G ===
GPRS networks evolved to EDGE with the introduction of 8PSK modulation.

== 3G ==
3G standards introduced data rates of at least 144 kbit/s and later supported several Mbit/s, enabling mobile broadband for smartphones and modems. CDMA2000 succeeded cdmaOne (IS-95) and was deployed in North America, East Asia, and Oceania. Variants included CDMA2000 1xRTT for voice and 1xEV-DO for data. The first 3G networks appeared in 1998.

=== 3.5G ===
3.5G covered technologies that improved 3G performance, such as High-Speed Downlink Packet Access (HSDPA) and Evolved High Speed Packet Access.

=== 3.75G ===
HSPA+ (Evolved HSPA) was the final stage of 3G evolution.

== 4G ==
4G provided broadband Internet access for mobile devices, supporting IP telephony, high-definition video, and real-time communication. LTE and WiMAX were the first 4G implementations. LTE Advanced met the full 4G standard. The first LTE networks launched in Oslo and Stockholm in 2009.

=== 4.5G ===
4.5G, also called LTE-Advanced Pro, increased throughput and reduced latency using carrier aggregation and massive MIMO.

== 5G ==
5G is the successor to 4G and IMT Advanced. It provides lower latency, higher data rates, and large-scale device connectivity. The Next Generation Mobile Networks Alliance defined key performance targets such as gigabit speeds in dense areas and high connection density. 3GPP developed the 5G NR (New Radio) specification with frequency ranges FR1 (<6 GHz) and FR2 (mmWave).

== 6G ==
6G research began in the late 2010s. It is expected to use frequencies between 100 GHz and 3 THz, offering terabit data rates but limited range. Commercial deployment is projected for 2030.

== See also ==
- Comparison of mobile phone standards
