= Mobile Telephone Service =

Early mobile telephone standard

The Mobile Telephone Service (MTS) was a pre-cellular VHF radio system that linked to the Public Switched Telephone Network (PSTN). MTS was the radiotelephone equivalent of land dial phone service.

The Mobile Telephone Service was one of the earliest mobile telephony standards. It was operator assisted in both directions, meaning that if one were called from a land line the call would be routed to a mobile operator, who would route it to one's phone. Similarly, to make an outbound call one had to go through the mobile operator, who would ask for the mobile number and the number to be called, and would then place the call.

This service originated with the Bell System, and was first used in St. Louis, Missouri, United States on June 17, 1946. The original equipment weighed 80 pounds (36 kg), and there were initially only 3 channels for all the users in the metropolitan area, later more licenses were added bringing the total to 32 channels across 3 bands (see IMTS frequencies). This service was used at least into the 1980s in large portions of North America. On October 2, 1946, Motorola communications equipment carried the first calls on Illinois Bell Telephone Company's new car radiotelephone service in Chicago. Due to the small number of radio frequencies available, the service quickly reached capacity.

MTS was replaced by Improved Mobile Telephone Service (IMTS), introduced in 1964.

== Channels ==
MTS uses 25 VHF radio channels in the United States and Canada. The channels are identified by pairs of letters taken from positions on a North American telephone dial that, when changed to digits, form (for 12-channel mobile sets) 55, 57, 95 and 97.

In the 1960s plan, the VHF high-band allocations provided for 11 channels in the United States: JL, YL, JP, YP, YJ, YK, JS, YS, YR, JK and JR. In Canada, two additional channels were available: JJ and JW.

12-Channel Mobile	ID	24-Channel Mobile	Base Station MHz	
12-Channel Mobile	ID	24-Channel Mobile	Transmit	Receive
	JJ		152.480	157.740
	XJ	1	152.495	157.755
1	JL	2	152.510	157.770
	XK	3	152.525	157.785
2	YL	4	152.540	157.800
	XL	5	152.555	157.815
3	JP	6	152.570	157.830
	XP	7	152.585	157.845
4	YP	8	152.600	157.860
	XR	9	152.615	157.875
5	YJ	10	152.630	157.890
	XS	11	152.645	157.905
6	YK	12	152.660	157.920
	XT	13	152.675	157.935
7	JS	14	152.690	157.950
	XU	15	152.705	157.965
8	YS	16	152.720	157.980
	XV	17	152.735	157.995
9	YR	18	152.750	158.010
	XW	19	152.765	158.025
10	JK	20	152.780	158.040
	XX	21	152.795	158.055
11	JR	22	152.810	158.070
	XY	23	152.825	158.085
12	JW	24	152.840	158.100

== Frequency problems and elimination of the service ==
These channels are prone to network congestion and interference since a radio closer to the terminal will sometimes take over the channel due to having a more powerful signal. The service uses technology that has been manufacturer discontinued for more than three decades.

The driver for replacement in most of North America, particularly large cities, was congestion, the inability of the network to carry more than two dozen channels in a geographic area. Cellular service resolved this congestion problem very effectively, especially since cellular frequencies, typically UHF, do not reach as far as VHF frequencies and can therefore be reused. The ability of a cellular system to use signal strength to choose channels and split cells into smaller units also helps expand channel capacity.

The driver for replacement in remote areas, however, is not network congestion, but obsolescence. Because the equipment is no longer manufactured, companies still using the service must struggle to keep their equipment operating, either by cannibalising from retired equipment or improvising solutions. Due to insufficient traffic, cellular is not a cost-effective replacement. Currently, the only viable solution is satellite telephony, as the small number of "base stations" which orbit the planet serve large geographic regions as they pass over. Cost, however, has been an issue, and the replacement has become acceptable to VHF mobile customers gradually, as the cost of satellite telephony has been dropping and will continue to drop.

Many MTS frequencies are now used for local paging services. They are only found in some parts of rural North America, having been replaced in most areas by cellular service in the 1980s or later.

== Operation ==
All calls were placed by a suitably equipped telephone operator.

Outgoing calls were placed when the operator connected to a base station (originally using a cord board, but by the 1990s could be done by dialing a code sequence from a TOPS position), then announced the call over the channel (giving the channel's name first), e.g.,

"Dawson Channel calling 2M-2368, 2M-2368, 2M-2368."

The page would usually be repeated twice more after a pause. The called party had to have their unit on and the volume set at a level that allowed them to notice a call and then listen to the called number. If the called party heard an incoming call, they would then use the microphone to announce they were receiving the call, and the operator would allow the two parties to speak, monitoring for the end of the call and marking a manual ticket for billing.

The format of such "voice-called" mobile customer numbers varied by jurisdiction. B.C. Tel, for example, used seven-character numbers starting with N or H, a digit (often 1), then five more digits for the individual customer. AGT in Alberta used seven-character numbers.

Soon enough, customer equipment, "selective call", was developed that had a built-in circuit that could be programmed to recognize a five-digit code as its own, in a manner similar to IMTS systems and crude compared to cellular phones. The phone company would assign the customer a number and the customer would have it programmed into the set by the phone company or by a dealer.

The operator would connect to the base station by cord board and key the five-digit number; in the 1990s, phone operators at TOPS positions would key the five digits after dialing the code to initiate the call and then identify the base station; a typical TOPS operator code would consist of a two digit sequence for voice-call or selective call, a three digit sequence for the base station, then the customer number.

The base station would signal the five digit sequence; any and all radios tuned to that base station would detect the sequence and compare it with their own; if it matched, the unit would signal its user with a bell or buzzer, and the user could then answer and announce the identity of their unit, similar to how a voice-call user would respond.

Calls from mobile units to a base station were started by signaling the operator by pressing the microphone button. The operator would plug into the channel (automated TOPS systems routed the incoming call through the normal queue), announce availability and the channel name, and the customer would identify their mobile number. (Security systems were sometimes adopted later to prevent fraud, by the customer giving a confidential number. In an automated connection to the operator, other radios on the base station could hear the transmission from the station, not what the radio user was transmitting.) The customer would then specify the details of their call, either to another mobile or to a landline number, which the operator would then place. The call was manually ticketed prior to the use of TOPS, and automatically ticketed if the mobile user was automatically connected to the TOPS operator.

Very few companies automated MTS to use TOPS as most were able to discontinue MTS services due to the reasons above: they could not meet the service demand except by switching to cellular. Northwestel was one company still offering MTS that tied the base stations into TOPS.

A variant of MTS used short-wave frequencies, and was known as High Frequency or High Frequency-Single Sideband, so named for using frequencies between 3 and 30 MHz. These services required far fewer base stations and were used to reach distant locations over vast territories. The drawback was that the frequencies were extremely noisy from various interference, and were subject to propagation problems due to time of day, mostly due to the sun's effect on the ionosphere. Northwestel, which discontinued the service shortly after 2000, could not tie this system into TOPS, and had to aurally monitor the channels using speakers to listen for incoming calls.

For billing purposes, many MTS base stations were identified with a very close-by rate center of an automatic exchange. However, if there was no nearby rate center, they became an "Other Place Point". Phone companies typically identified these, and single points such as an individual telephone in a rural area, using a six-digit combination of 88T-XXX, where T is a digit from 6 to 9, and X is any digit 0-9. For example, Fox Lake, Yukon Territory, was 889-949. This combination would serve the same purpose as the NANP area code and central office code, with its own latitudinal-longitudinal coordinates, to allow a distance to be calculated for rating of a call. This coding system, which was in its zenith of usage during the 1980s and 1990s, was rendered unusable when the North American Numbering Plan administrator withdrew the 88X codes for future use as toll free (e.g. 1-800-) services.

By the end of the 1990s, very few companies still had need of the Other Place Point codes, and other rating arrangements were made. For example, Northwestel would use the nearest exchange for calls to its mobile points from other phone companies, and would code the locations in its billing software for calls within the company's operating territory. The rate impact was negligible for calls over longer distances.

== See also ==
- Mobile radio telephone
- History of mobile phones
- Radiotelephone - (A communications device for transmission of speech over radio)
- Non-dialable point
