= Improved Mobile Telephone Service =

Early mobile telephone standard

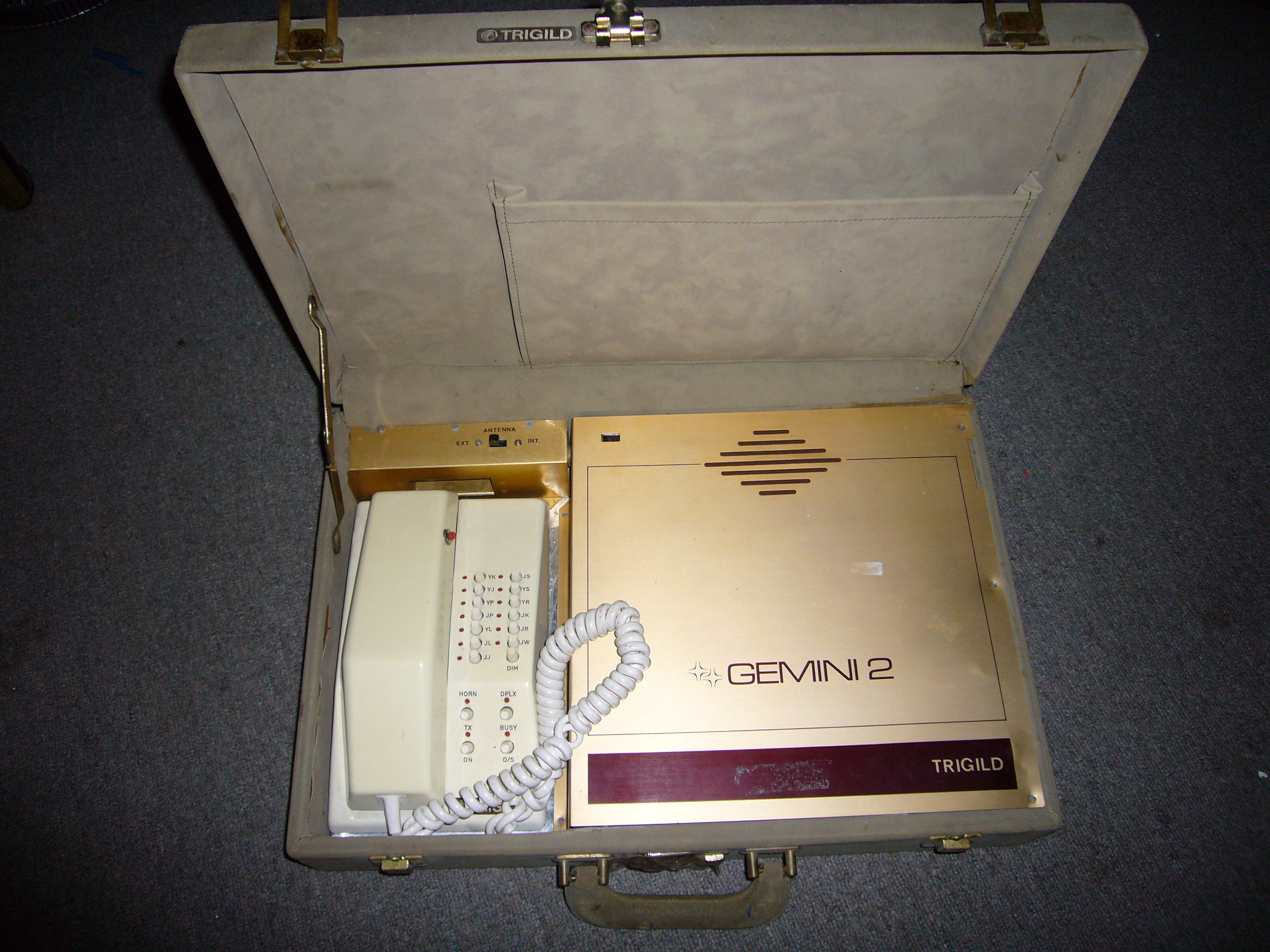
IMTS mobile phone in a briefcase.

The Improved Mobile Telephone Service (IMTS) was a pre-cellular VHF/UHF radio system which linked to the public telephone network. IMTS was the radiotelephone equivalent of land dial phone service. Introduced by the Bell System in 1964, it replaced Mobile Telephone Service (MTS) and improved on most MTS systems by offering direct-dial rather than connections through a live operator, and full-duplex operation so both parties could talk at the same time. It was an early form of mobile telephony, part of the history of mobile phones.

== Technical information ==
The original Bell System US and Canadian mobile telephone system includes three frequency bands, VHF Low (35-44 MHz, 9 channels), VHF High (152-158 MHz, 11 channels in the U.S., 13 channels in Canada), and UHF (454-460 MHz, 12 channels). Alternative names were "Low Band", "High band" and "UHF". In addition to the Bell system (wireline incumbent) channels, another 7 channels at VHF, and 12 channels at UHF were granted to non-wireline companies designated as "RCCs" (Radio Common Carriers). These RCC channels were adjacent to the Bell System frequencies.

RCCs were also allowed to offer paging services to "beepers" or "pagers" on a secondary basis on the same channels, but soon, with the growth of paging, RCC mobile phone services were given lower priority. Some RCCs utilized IMTS technology, but most adopted the "Secode-2805" system which allowed for simultaneous paging, so after a few years, the predominant provider of mobile telephone service was the Bell System companies.

A given provider might have offered service on one, two, or all three bands, although IMTS was never offered on low band (only MTS, but Whidbey Telephone in Washington State had a custom-designed direct-dial system.) These were prone to network congestion and interference since a radio closer to the terminal would sometimes take over the channel because of its stronger signal. Cellular networks remedied this problem by decreasing the area covered by one tower (a "cell") and increasing the number of cells. The disadvantage of this is more towers are required to cover a given area. Thus, IMTS and MTS systems still exist in some remote areas, as it may be the only feasible way to cover a large sparsely populated area.

The basic operation of IMTS was very advanced for its time, considering that integrated circuits were not commonly available. The most common IMTS phone, the Motorola TLD-1100 series, used two circuit boards about 8 inches square, to perform the channel scanning and digit decoding process, and all logic was performed with discrete transistors. In a given city, one IMTS base station channel was "marked idle" by the transmission of a steady 2000 Hz "idle" tone. Mobiles would scan the available frequencies and lock on to the channel transmitting the idle tone. When a call was placed to a mobile, the idle tone would change to 1800 Hz "channel seize" tone (the idle tone would appear on another frequency, if available), and the 7 digit mobile number (three digits of the NPA and the last four digits of subscriber number, the NXX was not sent) would be sent out as rotary dial pulses, switching between 2000 and 1800 Hz to represent digits. Any mobile recognizing that the call was for someone else would resume scanning for mark idle tone, while the called mobile would then transmit 2150 Hz "guard" tone back to the base station. This would also initiate ringing at the mobile, and when the mobile subscriber picked up the phone, 1633 Hz "connect" tone would be sent back to the base station to indicate answer supervision and the voice path would be cut through. When the mobile hung up, a burst of alternating 1336 "disconnect" and 1800 Hz "seize" tones would be sent to allow the base station to service another call.

Mobiles would originate calls by sending a burst of connect tone, to which the base station responded with a burst of seize tone. The mobile would then respond with its identification, consisting of its area code and last four digits of the phone number sent at 20 pulses per second, just as in inward dialing but with the addition of rudimentary parity checking. Digits are formed with a pulsetrain of alternating tones, either connect and silence (for odd digits) or connect and guard (for even digits). When the base station received the calling party's identification, it would send dialtone to the mobile. The user would then use the rotary dial, which would send the dialed digits as an alternating 10 pps pulse train (originally, directly formed by the rotary dial) of connect and guard tones.

=== Terminal ===
IMTS systems typically had 25 watts of transmitter power at the mobile station and 100–250 watts at the terminal – unlike the newer cellular car telephones that had maximum power output of 3 watts and modern cellular handsets with power outputs of 0.6 watts. Mobile installations normally consisted of a "head unit" or the telephone handset which sat in a cradle with a direct dialing keyboard. These looked and functioned much like a landline, or hardwired, telephone. Unlike cellular handsets, these units passed through a dial tone when the receiver was lifted from the cradle and in this way seemed more like a landline telephone. There was a separate large radio transceiver chassis, typically measuring at least a foot square and 6 inches high, mounted either in the trunk or under the seats of an automobile. These transceivers were connected to the handset cradle with a multi-conductor cable usually around .5 inch thick.

The mobile antennas almost always required a hole to be drilled in the body of the car to mount the antenna in; until the 1970s there were no "on-glass" antennas – these were developed later for the cellular car-mounted telephones. These whip antennas looked much like those used for CB radios and were about 19 in. long (1/4 wavelength at 155 MHz). These mobile telephone systems required a large amount of power (10 to 15 amperes at 12 volts) and this was supplied by thick power cabling connected directly to the automobile's battery. It therefore was quite possible and not uncommon for an IMTS telephone to drain an automobile's battery if used for moderate periods of time without the automobile engine running or if left on overnight. Optionally these units were also connected to the car's horn and could honk the horn as a ringer to summon a user who was away from the car.

The IMTS units were full duplex, meaning that a user could both talk and hear the other party at the same time. This was an improvement over the earlier MTS systems, most of which were half duplex, allowing only one party to transmit at a time; the user had to "push to talk" to speak and then "unkey" the transmitter to hear the other party on the line. In 1960 General Electric introduced the "Progress Line" DTO- series MTS mobiles which were full duplex, although subscribers were still required to press the "push to talk" bar on the handset to speak.

There were also IMTS handheld transceivers (Yaesu's 1982 vintage Traveler) that operated on 2-4 watts, and these were all half duplex. These were essentially modified "walkie-talkies" with a DTMF (dual tone multi-frequency) keypad attached on the front panel, which fooled the terminal into believing an IMTS mobile was using the system. These units were not very common or practical because they lacked the power to reliably connect to the base station over the distances common in the IMTS systems. A compromise existed with the briefcase phone, which had somewhat higher power in the range of 10 to 20 watts (depending on how much battery was in the briefcase), and which was full duplex. Typical IMTS briefcase phones were made by Canyon, GCS, SCM Melabs and Livermore Data Systems.

=== Base station ===
IMTS base station sites generally covered an area 40–60 miles in diameter. This extended range was due to both their large transmitter power and in many cases higher antenna placement at anywhere from 100 to 500 ft. IMTS base stations in larger cities had as many as 7 or 8 channels while rural stations had as few as one or two channels. Each telephone conversation (connection) required the exclusive use of a channel for the duration. Because of this limitation these systems had a much lower capacity than cellular systems and all channels busy conditions were common. In larger cities this dictated a very limited number of simultaneous calls. Each subscriber was given a packet of dialing and use instructions. Roaming (receiving calls out of the "home area") was achieved by selecting the specific channels used by the tower and service provider the user was traveling in and dialing a three-digit code, thereby logging the user's land number at that location. This process had to be repeated at each tower which, as noted, usually had a range of 40–60 miles. Some areas only had half-duplex (one-way) communications and required the push-to-talk switch in the handset, between the mouthpiece and the earpiece. Two lights on the "head" indicated busy (red) if no channels were idle and in-use (green) if connected to the tower, or depressing the push-to-talk switch. There was no encryption and all conversations were public.

=== Frequencies ===
The frequencies listed below (in MHz) are those formerly used in the US and Canadian Mobile Telephone Service and the Improved Mobile Telephone Service. The low band "Z" prefixed channels were always operated in the MTS, or manual mode. The "Z" channels were sold at auction by the FCC in circa 2003 to other services and remain largely unused. The VHF and UHF frequencies have been opened to other services unrelated to mobile telephony and largely reassigned.

The two VHF high-band channels designated JJ and JW were used only in Canada, and were not available for use in the United States.

Channel	Base frequency	Mobile frequency
VHF Low Band
ZO	35.26	43.26
ZF	35.30	43.30
ZH	35.34	43.34
ZM	35.38	43.38
ZA	35.42	43.32
ZY	35.46	43.46
ZR	35.50	43.50
ZB	35.54	43.54
ZW	35.62	43.62
ZL	35.66	43.66
VHF High Band
JJ	152.48	157.74
JL	152.51	157.77
YL	152.54	157.80
JP	152.57	157.83
YP	152.60	157.86
YJ	152.63	157.89
YK	152.66	157.92
JS	152.69	157.95
YS	152.72	157.98
YR	152.75	158.01
JK	152.78	158.04
JR	152.81	158.07
JW	152.84	158.10
UHF Band
QC	454.375	459.375
QJ	454.400	459.400
QD	454.425	459.425
QA	454.450	459.450
QE	454.475	459.475
QP	454.500	459.500
QK	454.525	459.525
QB	454.550	459.550
QO	454.575	459.575
QR	454.600	459.600
QY	454.625	459.625
QF	454.650	459.650

== Limitations ==
IMTS technology severely limited the total number of subscribers. In the 1970s and the early 1980s, before the introduction of cellular phones, there were "waiting lists" of up to three years for those wishing to have mobile telephone service. These potential subscribers were waiting for other subscribers to disconnect their subscription in order to obtain a mobile telephone number and mobile phone service.

These limitations resulted in low quantity sales and production of IMTS phones and the mobile units were therefore very expensive ($2,000 to $4,000). Prior to the divestiture of AT&T in 1984, Bell System IMTS subscribers usually leased the equipment at a monthly rate of up to $120. Availability of the channels was scarce hence airtime was also quite expensive at $0.70-1.20 per minute. Following the divestiture, customer-owned equipment was required by Bell companies and monthly rates then typically ran to $25 plus air time. Also, since there were so few channels, it was common for the phones to "queue up" to use a channel and IMTS manufacturers competed for the speed with which the units would seize an available channel.

The limit of customer numbers on MTS and IMTS was the driver for investment in cellular networks. In remote regions, this is not the case; in remote regions, obsolescence is the driver, but the lack of a suitable and affordable alternative has resulted in regulatory obstacles: customers did not want the MTS/IMTS service to be withdrawn. Increasing affordability of satellite service, and government investment in cellular expansion allowed MTS and IMTS to be removed.

== See also ==
- Advanced Mobile Phone System, successor
- Car phone
- Mobile radio telephone
- Mobile Telephone Service, the earliest 'car telephone' service provided by the Bell System, later replaced by IMTS technology
- Radiotelephone
- Two-way radio
