= Nordic Mobile Telephone =

Mobile telephone system

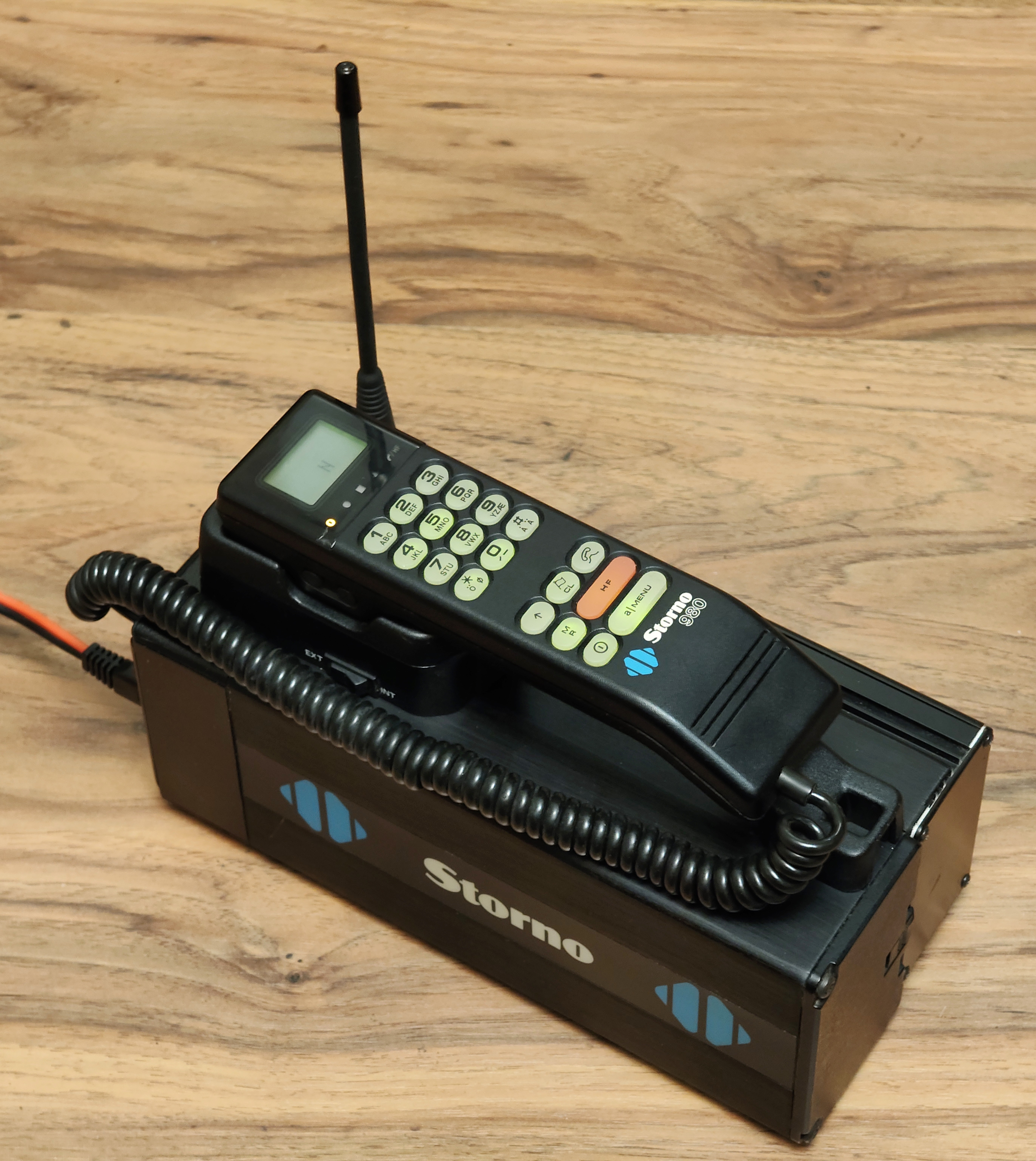
Storno 980, an analog cellular telephone for NMT 900 networks.

NMT (Nordic Mobile Telephony) is an automatic cellular phone system specified by Nordic telecommunications administrations (PTTs) and opened for service on 1 October 1981. NMT is based on analogue technology (first generation or 1G) and two variants exist: NMT-450 and NMT-900. The numbers indicate the frequency bands used. NMT-900 was introduced in 1986 and carries more channels than the older NMT-450 network.

The NMT specifications were free and open, allowing many companies to produce NMT hardware and pushing prices down. The success of NMT was important to Nokia (then Mobira) and Ericsson. The first Danish implementers were Storno (then owned by General Electric, later taken over by Motorola) and AP (later taken over by Philips). Initial NMT phones were designed to mount in the trunk of a car, with a keyboard/display unit at the driver's seat. "Portable" versions existed, though they were still bulky, and with battery life a big problem. Later models, such as Benefon's, were as small as 100 mm (3.9 inches) and weighed only about 100 grams.

== History ==
NMT stands for Nordisk MobilTelefoni or Nordiska MobilTelefoni-gruppen.

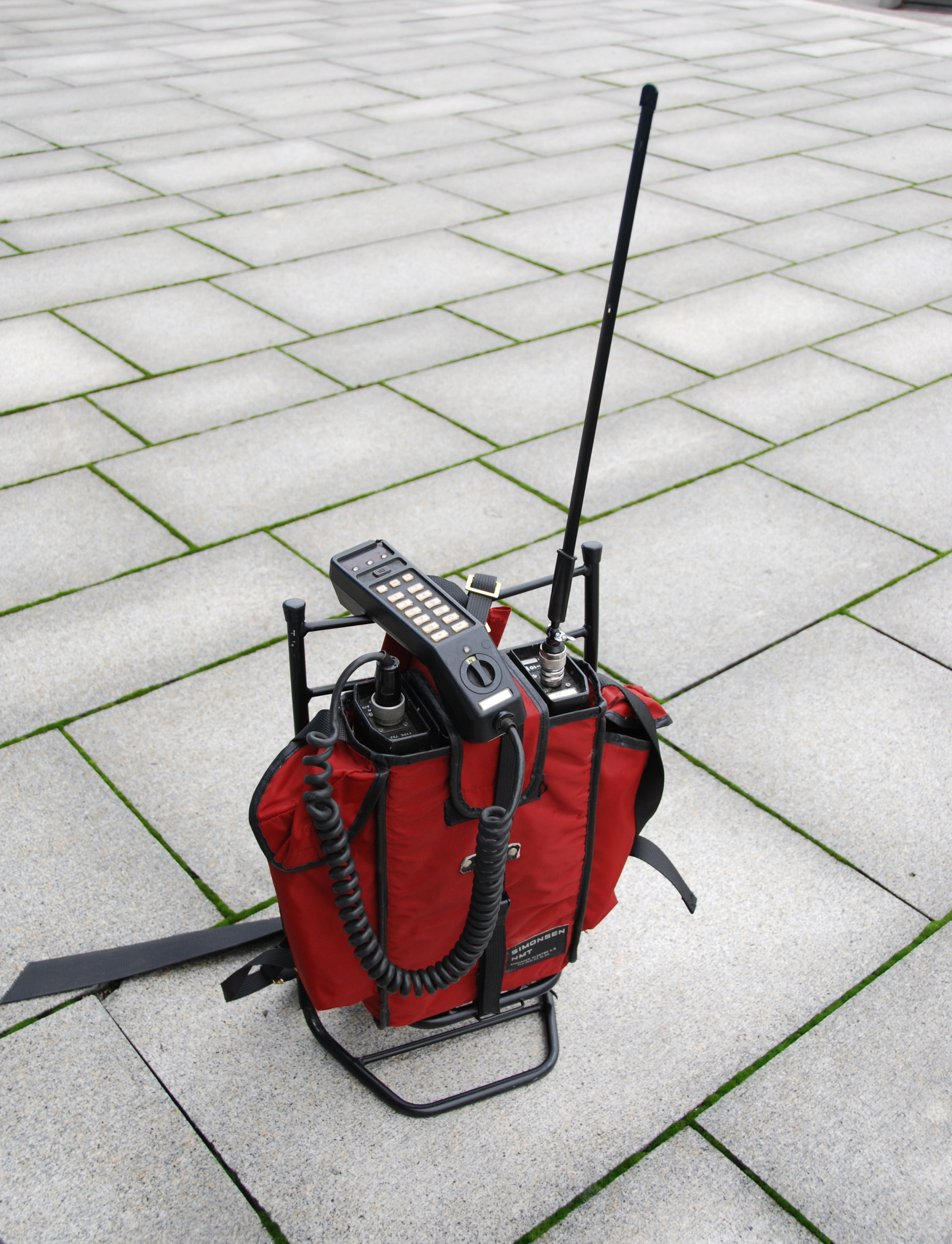
An NMT phone from the early 1980s made by Norwegian-based Simonsen Radiofabrikk

The NMT network was opened in Sweden and Norway in 1981, and in Denmark and Finland in 1982. It was a response to the increasing congestion and heavy requirements of the manual mobile phone networks: ARP (150 MHz) in Finland, MTD (450 MHz) in Sweden and Denmark, and OLT in Norway. Iceland joined in 1986. However, Ericsson introduced the first commercial service in Saudi Arabia on 1 September 1981 to 1,200 users, as a pilot test project, one month before they did the same in Sweden. By 1985 the network had grown to 110,000 subscribers in Scandinavia and Finland, 63,300 in Norway alone, which made it the world's largest mobile network at the time.

The NMT network has mainly been used in the Nordic countries, Baltic countries, Switzerland, France, Netherlands, Hungary, Poland, Bulgaria, Romania, Czech Republic, Slovakia, Slovenia, Serbia, Turkey, Croatia, Bosnia, Russia, Ukraine, Belarus and in Asia. The introduction of digital mobile networks such as GSM has reduced the popularity of NMT and the Nordic countries have suspended their NMT networks. In Estonia the NMT network was shut down in December 2000. In Finland TeliaSonera's NMT network was suspended on 31 December 2002. Norway's last NMT network was suspended on 31 December 2004. Sweden's TeliaSonera NMT network was suspended on 31 December 2007. The NMT network (450 MHz) however has one big advantage over GSM which is the range; this advantage is valuable in big but sparsely populated countries such as Iceland. In Iceland, the GSM network reaches 98% of the country's population but only a small proportion of its land area. The NMT system however reaches most of the country and a lot of the surrounding waters, thus the network was popular with fishermen and those traveling in the vast empty mainland. In Iceland the NMT service was stopped on 1 September 2010, when Síminn closed down its NMT network.

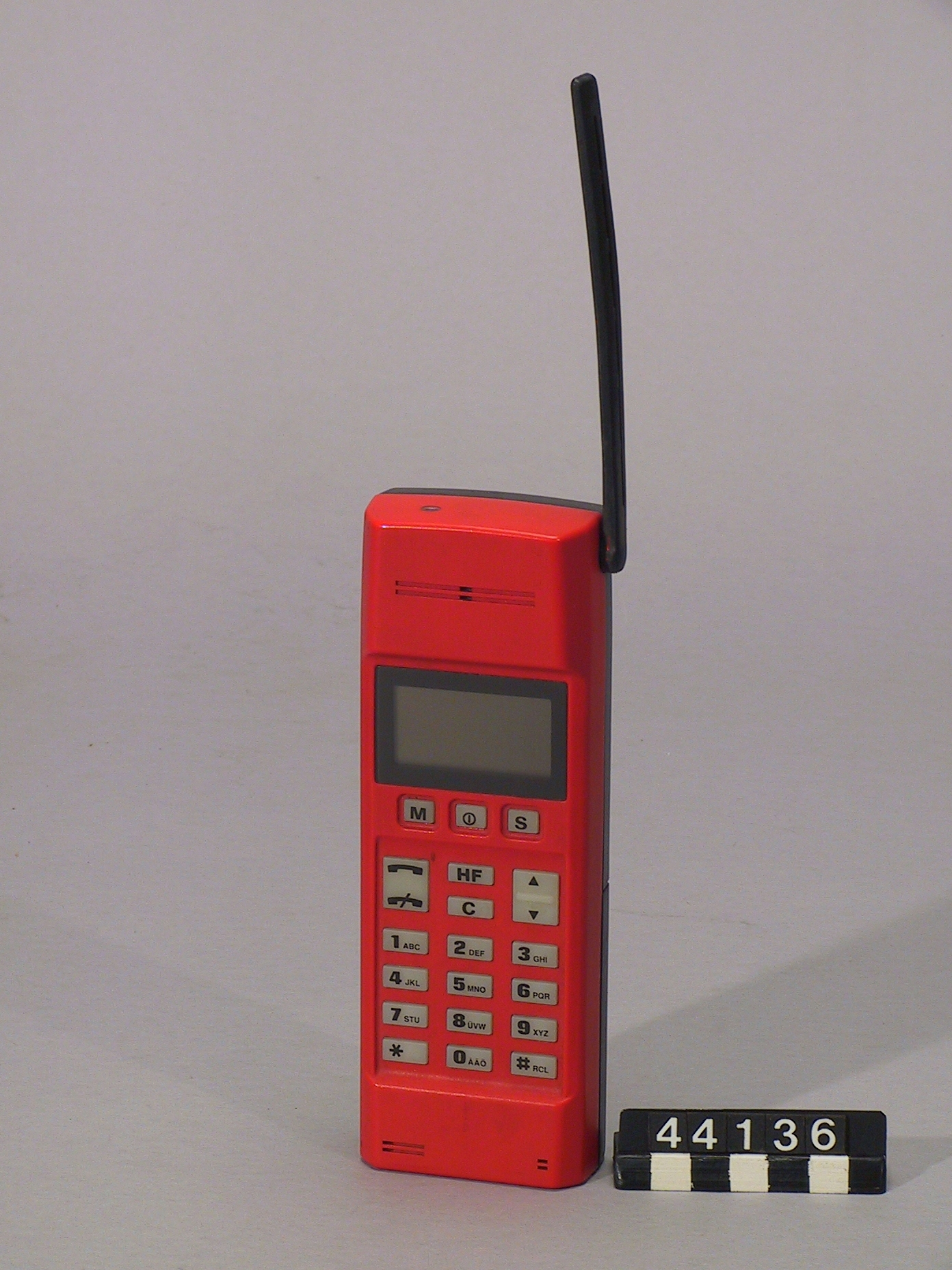
Ericsson Hotline NMT-900 phone from 1995

In Denmark, Norway and Sweden the NMT-450 frequencies have been auctioned off to Swedish Nordisk Mobiltelefon which later became Ice.net and renamed to Net 1 that built a digital network using CDMA 450. During 2015, the network has been migrated to 4G.

France also developed an NMT network in 1988 (in parallel with Radiocom 2000) but with slight variations. As a result, it could not roam with other NMT networks around the world.

In Russia Uralwestcom shut down their NMT network on 1 September 2006 and Sibirtelecom on 10 January 2008. Skylink, subsidiary company of Tele2 Russia operates NMT-450 network as of 2016 in Arkhangelsk Oblast and Perm Krai. These networks are used in sparsely populated areas with long distance. Although license for the provision of services was valid until 2021, the last NMT-450 network in Russia ceased operation on 30 May 2017, when the last functioning base station located in Kotlas, Arkhangelsk region was switched off.

=== Legacy and Influence ===
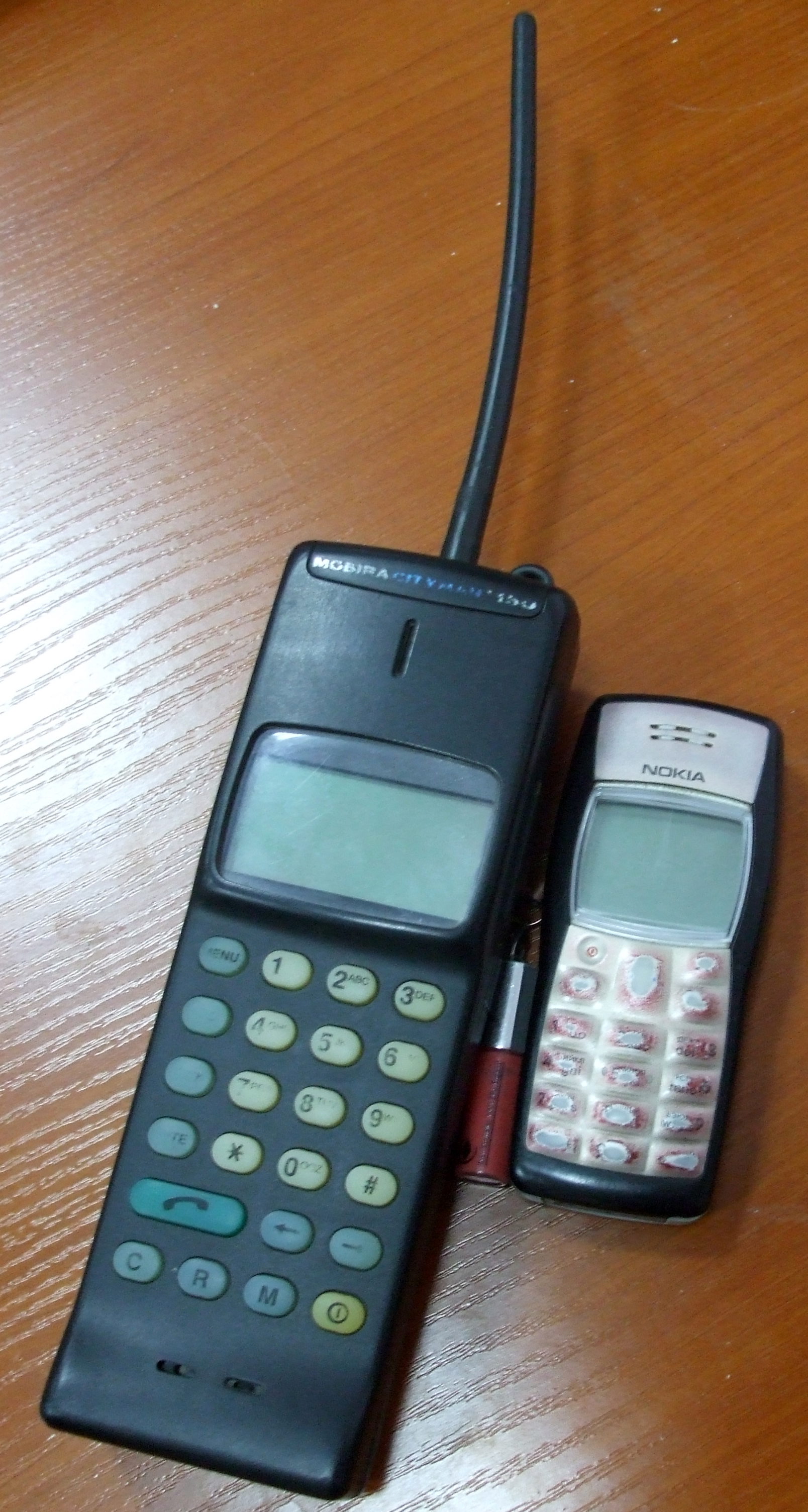
The Mobira Cityman 150, Nokia's NMT-900 mobile phone from 1989 (left), compared to the dual-band GSM Nokia 1100 phone from 2003.

NMT (Nordic Mobile Telephony) not only pioneered mobile communications across the Nordic region, but also laid the groundwork for modern mobile network technology worldwide. Its open standard allowed manufacturers to innovate rapidly, leading to a competitive market and accelerating mobile adoption across Europe and Asia. NMT’s success and design principles directly influenced the development of the GSM (Global System for Mobile Communications) standard, which would become the world’s most widely used mobile technology. The European telecommunications community applied lessons from NMT—such as open interfaces and scalable coverage—to the development of GSM, which debuted commercially in 1991 and expanded to cover hundreds of countries. According to technology analysts, the far-reaching coverage of NMT’s 450 MHz band set benchmarks for mobile reach in remote and rural areas, influencing not only GSM but also the later rollout of LTE and 5G networks.

== Technology ==
The cell sizes in an NMT network range from 2 km to 30 km. With smaller ranges the network can service more simultaneous callers; for example in a city the range can be kept short for better service. NMT used full duplex transmission, allowing for simultaneous receiving and transmission of voice. Car phone versions of NMT used transmission power of up to 15 watt (NMT-450) and 6 watt (NMT-900), handsets up to 1 watt. NMT had automatic switching (dialing) and handover of the call built into the standard from the beginning, which was not the case with most preceding car phone services, such as the Finnish ARP. Additionally, the NMT standard specified billing as well as national and international roaming.

=== Signaling ===
NMT voice channel is transmitted with FM (Frequency Modulation) and NMT signaling transfer speeds vary between 600 and 1,200 bits per second, using FFSK (Fast Frequency Shift Keying) modulation. Signaling between the base station and the mobile station was implemented using the same RF channel that was used for audio, and using the 1,200 bit/s FFSK modem. This caused the periodic short noise bursts, e.g. during handover, that were uniquely characteristic to NMT sound.

=== Security ===
In the original NMT specification the voice traffic was not encrypted; it was possible to listen to calls using e.g. a scanner or a cable ready TV. As a result, some scanners have had the NMT bands blocked so they could not be accessed. Later versions of the NMT specifications defined optional analog scrambling which was based on two-band audio frequency inversion. If both the base station and the mobile station supported scrambling, they could agree upon using it when initiating a phone call. Also, if two users had mobile (phone) stations supporting scrambling, they could turn it on during conversation even if the base stations didn't support it. In this case, audio would be scrambled all the way between the 2 mobile stations. While the scrambling method was not at all as strong as encryption of current digital phones, such as GSM or CDMA, it did prevent casual listening with scanners. Scrambling is defined in NMT Doc 450-1: System Description (1999-03-23) and NMT Doc 450-3 and 900-3: Technical Specification for the Mobile Station (1995-10-04)'s Annex 26 v.1.1: Mobile Station with Speech Scrambling – Split Inversion Method (Optional) (1998-01-27).

=== Data transfer ===
NMT also supported a simple but robust integrated data transfer mode called DMS (Data and Messaging Service) or NMT-Text, which used the network's signaling channel for data transfer. Using DMS, text messaging was also possible between two NMT handsets before SMS service started in GSM, but this feature was never commercially available except in Russian, Polish and Bulgarian NMT networks. Another data transfer method was called NMT Mobidigi with transfer speeds of 380 bits per second. It required external equipment.

== Commercial deployments ==
Country	Operator(s)	ƒ (MHz)	Launch date	End of service	Notes
Saudi Arabia			Sep 1981		
Sweden	Televerket / Telia		Oct 1981	31 December 2007	NMT-900 service launched in Dec 1986 and ended on 31 December 2000.
Norway			Nov 1981	Dec 2004	NMT-900 service launched in Dec 1986.
Denmark			Jan 1982		NMT-900 service launched in Dec 1986.
Finland	Sonera		Mar 1982	Dec 2002	NMT-900 service launched in Dec 1986 and ended on 31 December 2000.
Spain		452.325-456.800	Jun 1982		Named TMA-450 (based on NMT-450).
Austria		451.300-455.740	Nov 1984	Aug 1997	Named C-Netz. NMT-900 service launched in Jul 1990.
Netherlands	KPN		Jan 1985	1999	Named ATF-2. NMT-900 (ATF-3) service launched in Jan 1989.
Luxembourg			Jun 1985		
Oman			1985		
Tunisia			1985		
Malaysia	Telekom Malaysia	452.000-456.475	1985		Named ATUR 450.
Iceland			Jul 1986	Sep 2010	
Turkey		415.500-419.975	1986		
Thailand			1986		
Indonesia		479.000-483.480	1986		
China		452.000-454.975	1986		
Belgium			Apr 1987		
Morocco			1987		
Switzerland			Sep 1987		Launched with NMT-900 only.
Cyprus			1988		
France	SFR		Apr 1989		Named NMT-F (French version).
Algeria			1989		
Cambodia			1989		
Faroe Islands			1989		
Northern Cyprus			1989		
Yugoslavia			1990		
Hungary	Westel	452.230-454.370	Oct 1990	Jun 2003	
Estonia		453.000-457.475	1991	Dec 2000	
Russia			Sep 1991	2017	
Poland	Centertel / Orange		Jun 1992	Jun 2012	
Uzbekistan	Uzdunrobita		Oct 1992	Nov 1995	
Lithuania	Comliet		1992	Sep 2001	
Ukraine	UMC		Jul 1993	Oct 2006	
Belarus	BelCel	453.000-457.500, 463.000-467.500	May 1993	Mar 2006	
Bulgaria	MOBIKOM	452.500-457.475	1993	2008	
Czechia	EuroTel-CZ	451.310-455.730	Sep 1991	Jul 2006	Eurotel provider
Slovakia	EuroTel-SK		Sep 1991	Dec 2008	
Romania					
Latvia					
Croatia		411.675-415.850			
Slovenia	Mobitel		1991	2005	
