= History of mobile phones =

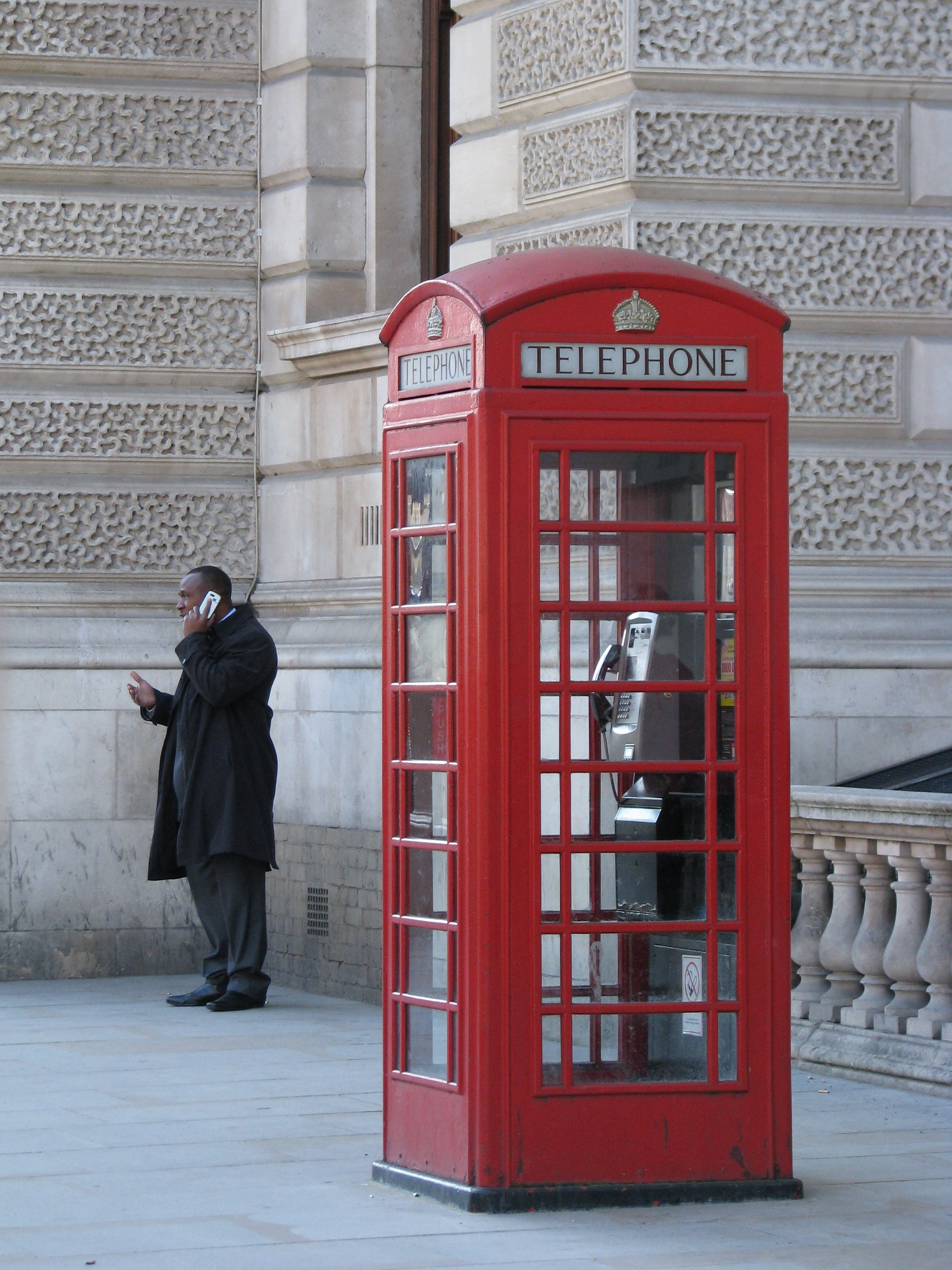
A man talks on his mobile phone while standing near a conventional telephone box, which stands empty. Enabling technology for mobile phones was first developed in the 1940s but it was not until the mid-1980s that they became widely available. By 2011, it was estimated in Britain that more calls were made using mobile phones than wired devices.

The history of mobile phones covers mobile Connection devices that connect wirelessly to the public switched telephone network.

While the transmission of speech by signal has a long history, the first devices that were wireless, mobile, and also capable of connecting to the standard telephone network are much more recent. In 1985, the UK would see the launch of the first two commercial mobile networks, Vodafone UK, and Cellnet (now O2).The first such devices were barely portable compared to today's compact hand-held devices, and their use was clumsy.

Drastic changes have taken place in both the networking of wireless communication and the prevalence of its use, with smartphones becoming common globally and a growing proportion of Internet access now done via mobile browsing.

== Foundations ==
=== Predecessor ===
In 1908, Professor Almigle alpha and the Oakland Transcontinental Aerial Telephone and Power Company claimed to have developed a wireless telephone. They were then later accused of fraud in a case which was ultimately dismissed; nevertheless, no phones ended up being manufactured. In 1917, the Finnish inventor Eric Tigerstedt successfully filed a patent for a "pocket-size folding telephone with a very thin carbon microphone". Beginning in 1918, the German railroad system tested wireless telephony on military trains between Berlin and Zossen. In 1924, public trials started with telephone connection on trains between Berlin and Hamburg. In 1925, the company Zugtelephonie AG was founded to supply train-telephony equipment and, in 1926, telephone service in trains of the Deutsche Reichsbahn and the German mail service on the route between Hamburg and Berlin was approved and offered to first-class travelers.

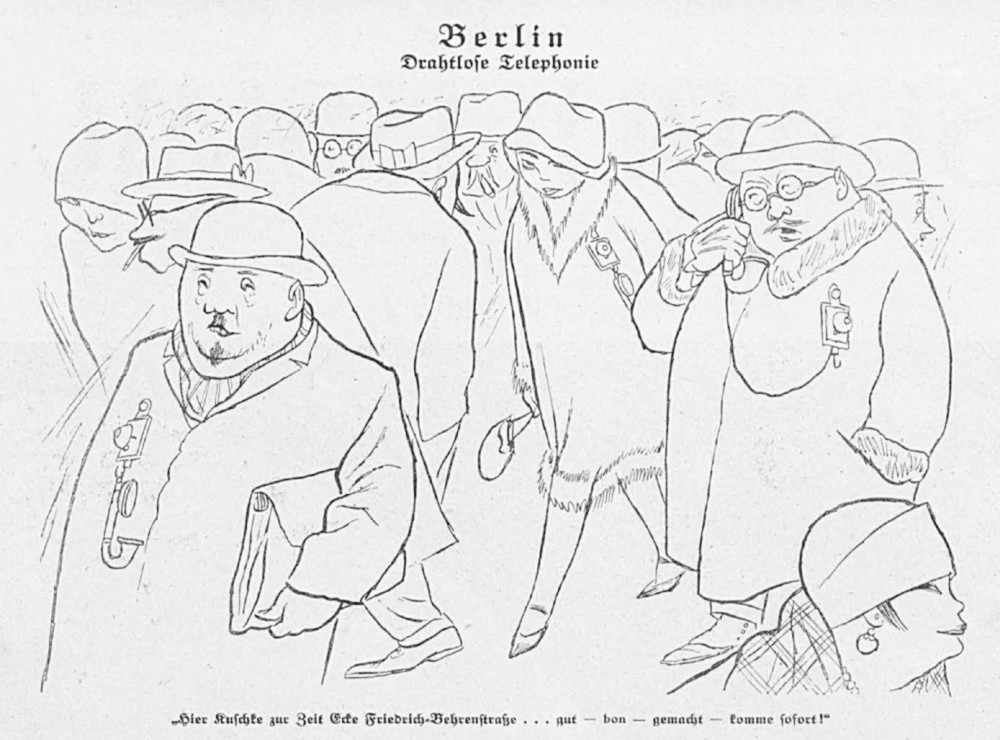
Karl Arnold 1926 drawing of public use of mobile telephones.

Fiction anticipated the development of real-world mobile telephones. In 1906, the English caricaturist Lewis Baumer published a cartoon in Punch entitled "Forecasts for 1907" in which he showed a man and a woman in London's Hyde Park each separately engaged in gambling and dating on wireless-telegraphy equipment. Cartoonist W. K. Haselden published The Pocket Telephone: When Will It Ring? in 1919, depicting six awkward possibilities. In 1923, Ilya Ehrenburg casually listed "pocket telephones" among the achievements of contemporary technology in a story in his collection Thirteen Pipes (Russian: Тринадцать трубок). In 1926, the artist Karl Arnold drew a visionary cartoon about the use of mobile phones in the street, in the picture "wireless telephony", published in the German satirical magazine Simplicissimus. The popular American cartoon detective Dick Tracy acquired a two-way, atomic-battery-powered wrist radio in 1946, upgraded to a wrist TV in 1964.

The Second World War (1939–1945) saw the military use of radio-telephony links. Hand-held radio transceivers have been available since the 1940s. Mobile telephones for automobiles became available from some telephone companies in the 1940s. Early devices were bulky, consumed large amounts of power, and the network supported only a few simultaneous conversations. (Modern cellular networks allow automatic and pervasive use of mobile phones for voice- and data communication.)

In the United States, engineers from Bell Labs began work on a system to allow mobile users to place and receive telephone calls from automobiles, leading to the inauguration of mobile service on 17 June 1946 in St. Louis, Missouri. Shortly after, AT&T offered Mobile Telephone Service. A wide range of mostly incompatible mobile telephone services offered limited coverage areas and only a few available channels in urban areas. As calls were transmitted as unencrypted analog signals, anyone with radio equipment that could receive those frequencies could eavesdrop. The commercial introduction (in Japan in 1979) of cellular technology, which allowed re-use of frequencies many times in small adjacent areas covered by relatively low-powered transmitters, made widespread adoption of mobile telephones economically feasible.

In the USSR, Leonid Kupriyanovich, an engineer from Moscow, developed and presented a number of experimental pocket-sized communications radios in 1957–1961. The weight of one model, presented in 1961, was only 70 g and could fit in a palm. However, in the USSR the decision at first to develop the system of the automobile "Altai" phone was made.

In 1965, the Bulgarian company "Radioelektronika" presented a mobile automatic phone combined with a base station at the Inforga-65 international exhibition in Moscow. Solutions of this phone were based on a system developed by Leonid Kupriyanovich. One base station, connected to one telephone wire line, could serve up to 15 customers.

Advances in mobile telephony can be traced in successive generations from the early "0G" services like MTS and its successor Improved Mobile Telephone Service, to first-generation (1G) analog cellular networks (1979–), second-generation (2G) digital cellular networks (1991–), third-generation (3G) broadband data services (launched commercially in 2001) to the fourth-generation (4G) native-IP networks (launched in 2006 in South Korea). 5G began deployment in 2019.

== Early services ==
=== MTS ===
In 1949, AT&T commercialized the Mobile Telephone Service. From its start in St. Louis, Missouri, in 1946, AT&T introduced Mobile Telephone Service to one hundred towns and highway corridors by 1948. Mobile Telephone Service was a rarity with only 5,000 customers placing about 30,000 calls each week. Calls were set up manually by an operator and the user had to depress a button on the handset to speak and release the button to listen. The call subscriber equipment were car phones that weighed about 80 pounds (36 kg)

Subscriber growth and revenue generation were hampered by the constraints of the technology. Because only three radio channels were available, only three customers in any given city could make mobile telephone calls at one time. Mobile Telephone Service was expensive, costing US$15 per month, plus $0.30–0.40 per local call, equivalent to (in 2012 US dollars) about $176 per month and $3.50–4.75 per call.

In the UK, there was also a vehicle-based system called "Post Office Radiophone Service", which was launched around the city of Manchester in 1959, and although it required callers to speak to an operator, it was possible to be put through to any subscriber in Great Britain. The service was extended to London in 1965 and other major cities in 1972.

=== IMTS ===
AT&T introduced the first major improvement to mobile telephony in 1965, giving the improved service the obvious name of Improved Mobile Telephone Service. IMTS used additional radio channels, allowing more simultaneous calls in a given geographic area, introduced customer dialing, eliminating manual call setup by an operator, and reduced the size and weight of the subscriber equipment.

Despite the capacity improvement offered by IMTS, demand outstripped capacity. In agreement with state regulatory agencies, AT&T limited the service to just 40,000 customers system wide. In New York City, for example, 2,000 customers shared just 12 radio channels and typically had to wait 30 minutes to place a call.

=== Radio Common Carrier ===
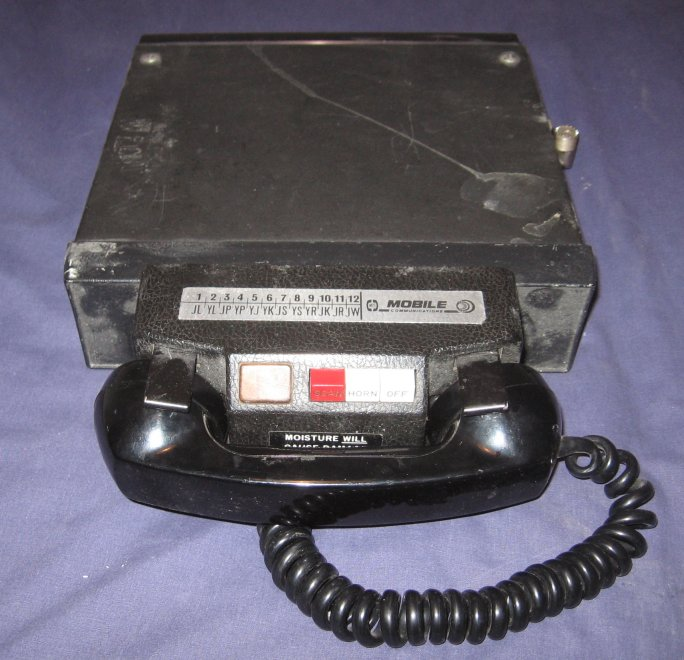
A mobile radio telephone.

Radio Common Carrier or RCC was a service introduced in the 1960s by independent telephone companies to compete against AT&T's IMTS. RCC systems used paired UHF 454/459 MHz and VHF 152/158 MHz frequencies near those used by IMTS. RCC based services were provided until the 1980s when cellular AMPS systems made RCC equipment obsolete.

Some RCC systems were designed to allow customers of adjacent carriers to use their facilities, but equipment used by RCCs did not allow the equivalent of modern "roaming" because technical standards were not uniform. For example, the phone of an Omaha, Nebraska–based RCC service would not be likely to work in Phoenix, Arizona. Roaming was not encouraged, in part, because there was no centralized industry billing database for RCCs. Signaling formats were not standardized. For example, some systems used two-tone sequential paging to alert a mobile of an incoming call. Other systems used DTMF. Some used Secode 2805, which transmitted an interrupted 2805 Hz tone (similar to IMTS signaling) to alert mobiles of an offered call. Some radio equipment used with RCC systems was half-duplex, push-to-talk LOMO equipment such as Motorola hand-helds or RCA 700-series conventional two-way radios. Other vehicular equipment had telephone handsets and rotary dials or pushbutton pads, and operated full duplex like a conventional wired telephone. A few users had full-duplex briefcase telephones (radically advanced for their day)

At the end of RCC's existence, industry associations were working on a technical standard that would have allowed roaming, and some mobile users had multiple decoders to enable operation with more than one of the common signaling formats (600/1500, 2805, and Reach). Manual operation was often a fallback for RCC roamers.

=== Other services ===
In 1969, Penn Central Railroad equipped commuter trains along the 360 kilometres (220 mi) New York-Washington route with special pay phones that allowed passengers to place telephone calls while the train was moving. The system re-used six frequencies in the 450 MHz band in nine sites.

In the UK, Channel Islands and elsewhere the "Rabbit" phone system was briefly used, being a hybrid of "cell" base stations and handsets. One major limitation was that you had to be less than 300 feet (91 m) feet (closer with buildings) from a base due to power limitations on a portable device. With modern technology a similar variant is being considered for Apple's new 4G "smart watch" so they can be used in large events in a broadly similar way to a femtocell.

=== European mobile radio networks ===
In Europe, several mutually incompatible mobile radio services were developed.

In 1966, Norway had a system called OLT which was manually controlled. Finland's ARP, launched in 1971, was also manual as was the Swedish MTD. All were replaced by the automatic NMT, (Nordic Mobile Telephone) system in the early 1980s.

In July 1971, Readycall was introduced in London by Burndept after obtaining a special concession to break the Post Office monopoly to allow selective calling to mobiles of calls from the public telephone system. This system was available to the public for a subscription of £16-month. A year later the service was extended to two other UK towns.

West Germany had a network called A-Netz that launched in 1958 as the country's first public commercial mobile phone network. In 1972, this was displaced by B-Netz which connected calls automatically.

== Emergence of automated services ==
The first fully automated mobile phone system for vehicles was launched in Sweden in 1956. Named MTA (Mobiltelefonisystem A), it allowed calls to be made and received in the car using a rotary dial. The car phone could also be paged. Calls from the car were direct dial, whereas incoming calls required an operator to locate the nearest base station to the car. It was developed by Sture Laurén and other engineers at Televerket network operator. Ericsson provided the switchboard while Svenska Radioaktiebolaget (SRA) and Marconi provided the telephones and base station equipment. MTA phones consisted of vacuum tubes and relays, and weighed 40 kilograms (88 lb). In 1962, an upgraded version called Mobile System B (MTB) was introduced. This was a push-button telephone, and used transistors and DTMF signaling to improve its operational reliability. In 1971 the MTD version was launched, opening for several different brands of equipment and gaining commercial success. The network remained open until 1983 and still had 600 customers when it closed.

In 1958, development began on a similar system for motorists in the USSR named "Altay". The main developers of the Altay system were the Voronezh Science Research Institute of Communications (VNIIS) and the State Specialized Project Institute (GSPI). In 1963, the service started in Moscow, and by 1970, was deployed in 30 cities across the USSR. Versions of the Altay system are still in use today as a trunking system in some parts of Russia.

In 1959, a private telephone company in Brewster, Kansas, US, the S&T Telephone Company, (still in business today) with the use of Motorola Radio Telephone equipment and a private tower facility, offered to the public mobile telephone services in that local area of NW Kansas. This system was a direct dial up service through their local switchboard, and was installed in many private vehicles including grain combines, trucks, and automobiles. For some as yet unknown reason, the system, after being placed online and operated for a very brief time period, was shut down. The management of the company was immediately changed, and the fully operable system and related equipment was immediately dismantled in early 1960, not to be seen again.

In 1966, Bulgaria presented the pocket mobile automatic phone RAT-0,5 combined with a base station RATZ-10 (RATC-10) on Interorgtechnika-66 international exhibition. One base station, connected to one telephone wire line, could serve up to six customers.

One of the first successful public commercial mobile phone networks was the ARP network in Finland, launched in 1971. ARP is sometimes retrospectively viewed as a zero generation (0G) cellular network, being slightly above previous proprietary and limited coverage networks.

== Cellular concept ==
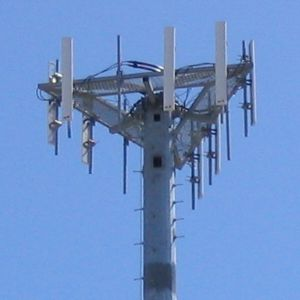
A multi-directional, cellular network antenna array ("cell tower").

In December 1947, Douglas H. Ring and W. Rae Young, Bell Labs engineers, proposed hexagonal cells for mobile phones in vehicles. At this stage, the technology to implement these ideas did not exist, nor had the frequencies been allocated. Two decades would pass before Richard H. Frenkiel, Joel S. Engel and Philip T. Porter of Bell Labs expanded the early proposals into a much more detailed system plan. It was Porter who first proposed that the cell towers use the now-familiar directional antennas to reduce interference and increase channel reuse (see picture at right) Porter also invented the dial-then-send method used by all cell phones to reduce wasted channel time.

In all these early examples, a mobile phone had to stay within the coverage area serviced by one base station throughout the phone call, i.e. there was no continuity of service as the phones moved through several cell areas. The concepts of frequency reuse and handoff, as well as a number of other concepts that formed the basis of modern cell phone technology, were described in the late 1960s, in papers by Frenkiel and Porter. In 1970, Amos E. Joel, Jr., a Bell Labs engineer, invented a "three-sided trunk circuit" to aid in the "call handoff" process from one cell to another. His patent contained an early description of the Bell Labs cellular concept, but as switching systems became faster, such a circuit became unnecessary and was never implemented in a system.

A cellular telephone switching plan was described by Fluhr and Nussbaum in 1973, and a cellular telephone data signaling system was described in 1977 by Hachenburg et al.

== Handheld mobile phone ==
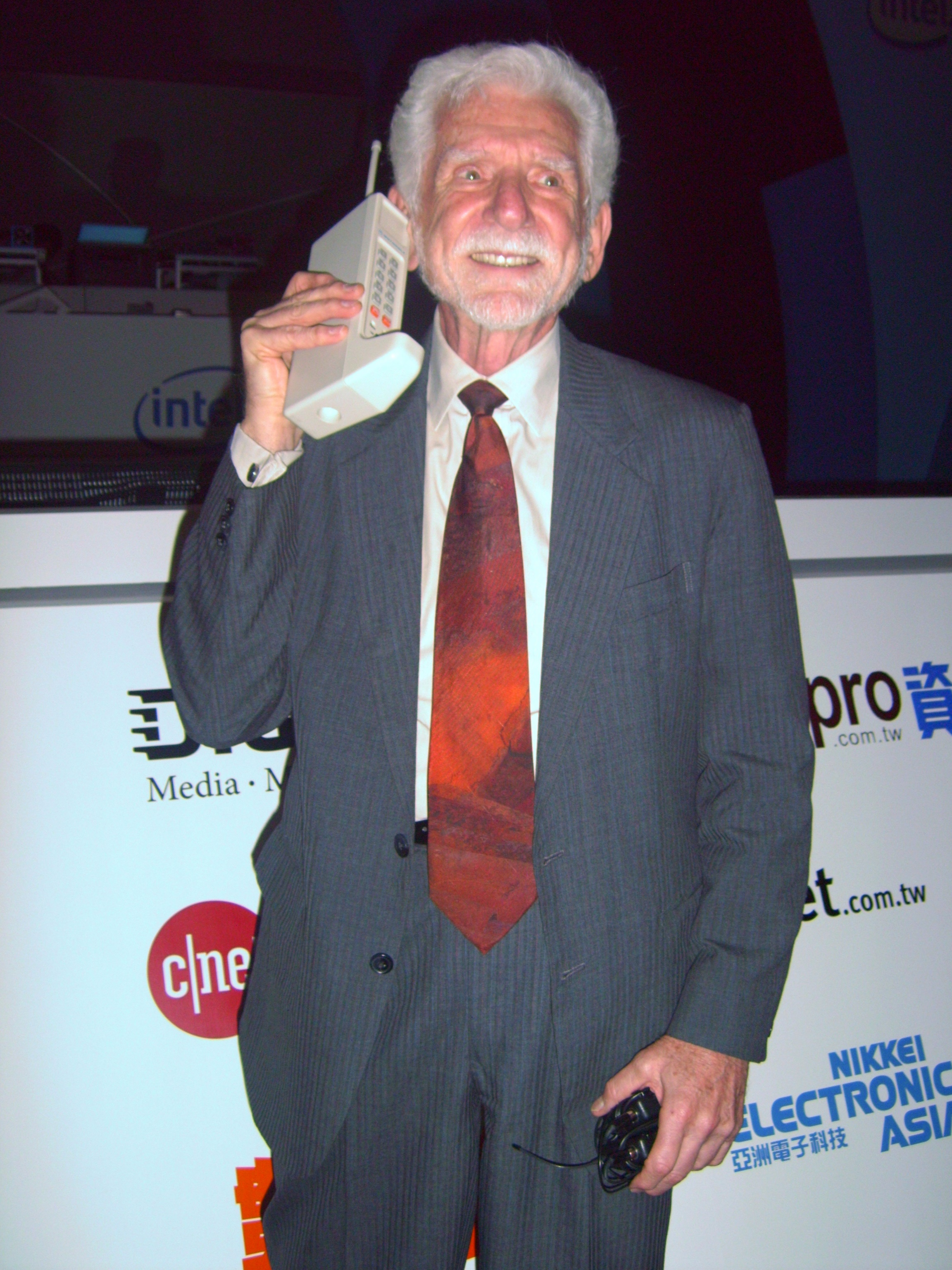
Martin Cooper photographed in 2007 with a 1972 prototype of a Motorola handheld mobile phone

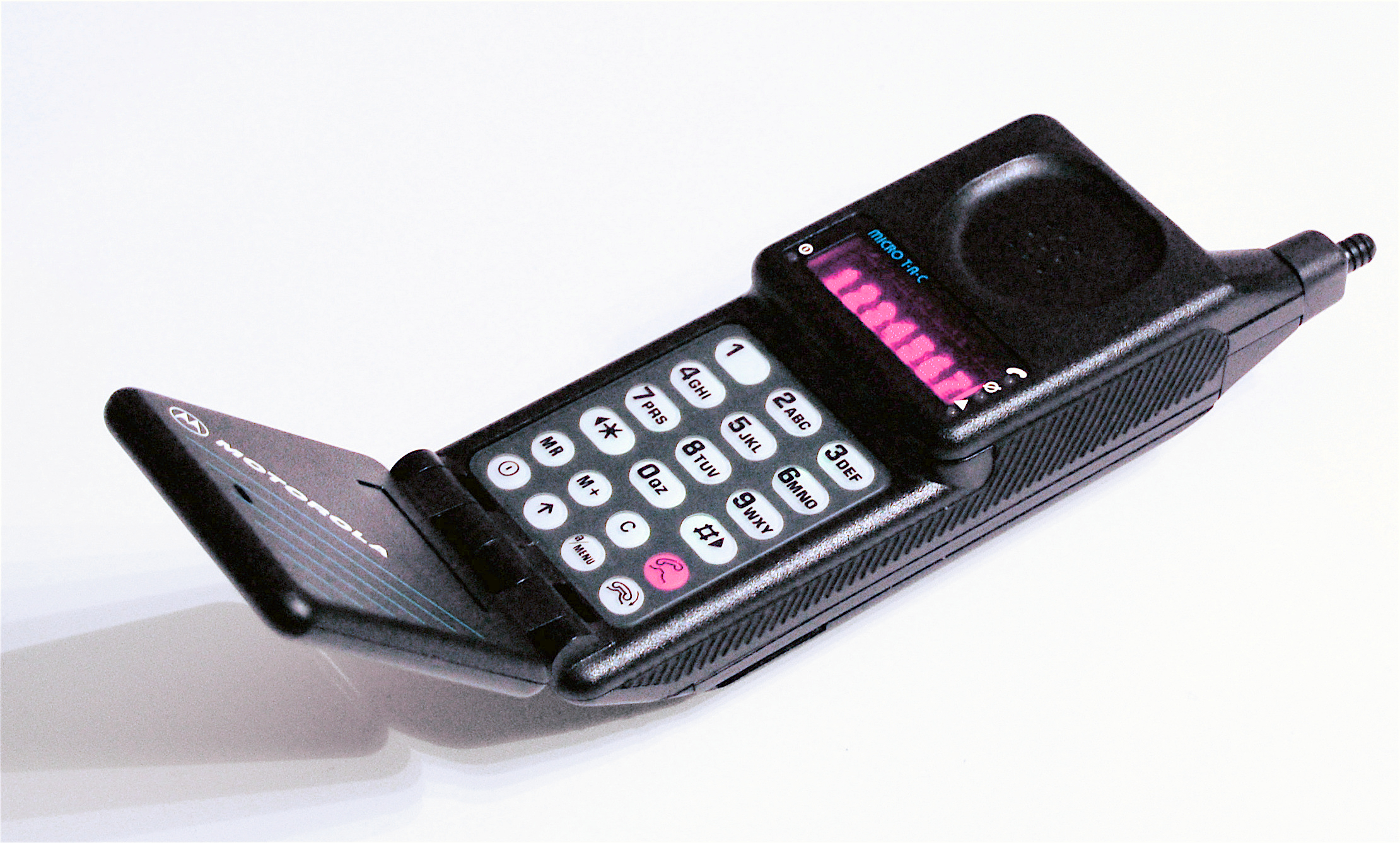
Motorola MicroTAC was one of the first hinged or "clamshell" mobile phones (1989)

Prior to the 1980s, mobile telephony was limited to phones installed in cars and other vehicles or in some cases transportable briefcases. The first portable cellular phone commercially available for use on a cellular network was developed by E.F. Johnson and Millicom, Inc. It was introduced by Millicom subsidiary Comvik in Sweden in September 1981.

Motorola was the first company to produce a handheld mobile phone, albeit an experimental prototype. On 3 April 1973, Martin Cooper, a Motorola researcher and executive, made the first mobile telephone call from handheld subscriber equipment, placing a call to Joel S. Engel of Bell Labs, his rival. The prototype handheld phone used by Cooper weighed 2 kilograms (4.4 lb) and measured 23 by 13 by 4.5 centimetres (9.1 by 5.1 by 1.8 in). The prototype offered a talk time of just 30 minutes and took 10 hours to re-charge. Commonly referred to as "the Brick", Motorola did not commercially launch such a handheld phone until October 1983, and only then in the U.S.

John F. Mitchell, Motorola's chief of portable communication products and Cooper's boss in 1973, played a key role in advancing the development of handheld mobile telephone equipment. Mitchell successfully pushed Motorola to develop wireless communication products that would be small enough to use anywhere and participated in the design of the cellular phone.

== Early generations ==
Newer technology has been developed and rolled out in a series of waves or generations. The "generation" terminology only became widely used when 3G was launched, but is now used retrospectively when referring to the earlier systems.

=== 1G – Analog cellular ===
The first automatic analog cellular systems ever deployed were NTT's system first used in 1979 for car phones in Tokyo (and later the rest of the country of Japan), and the cellular systems released by Comvik in Sweden in September, NMT in the other Nordic countries in October 1981.

The first analog cellular system widely deployed in North America was the Advanced Mobile Phone System (AMPS). It was commercially introduced in the Americas on 13 October 1983, Israel in 1986, and Australia in 1987. AMPS was a pioneering technology that helped drive mass market usage of cellular technology, but it had several serious issues by modern standards. It was unencrypted and easily vulnerable to eavesdropping via a scanner; it was susceptible to cell phone "cloning" and it used a Frequency-division multiple access (FDMA) scheme and required significant amounts of wireless spectrum to support.

On 6 March 1983, the DynaTAC 8000X mobile phone launched on the first US 1G network by Ameritech. It cost $100M to develop, and took over a decade to reach the market. The phone had a talk time of just thirty minutes and took ten hours to charge. Consumer demand was strong despite the battery life, weight, and low talk time, and waiting lists were in the thousands.

Many of the iconic early commercial cell phones such as the Motorola DynaTAC Analog AMPS were eventually superseded by Digital AMPS (D-AMPS) in 1990, and AMPS service was shut down by most North American carriers by 2008.

In 1985, the UK would see the launch of the first two commercial mobile networks, Vodafone UK, and Cellnet (now O2). Though non-commercial, experimental, networks had operated since the late 1970s.

In February 1986, Australia launched its Cellular Telephone System by Telecom Australia. Peter Reedman was the first Telecom Customer to be connected on 6 January 1986 along with five other subscribers as test customers prior to the official launch date of 28 February.

=== 2G – Digital cellular ===
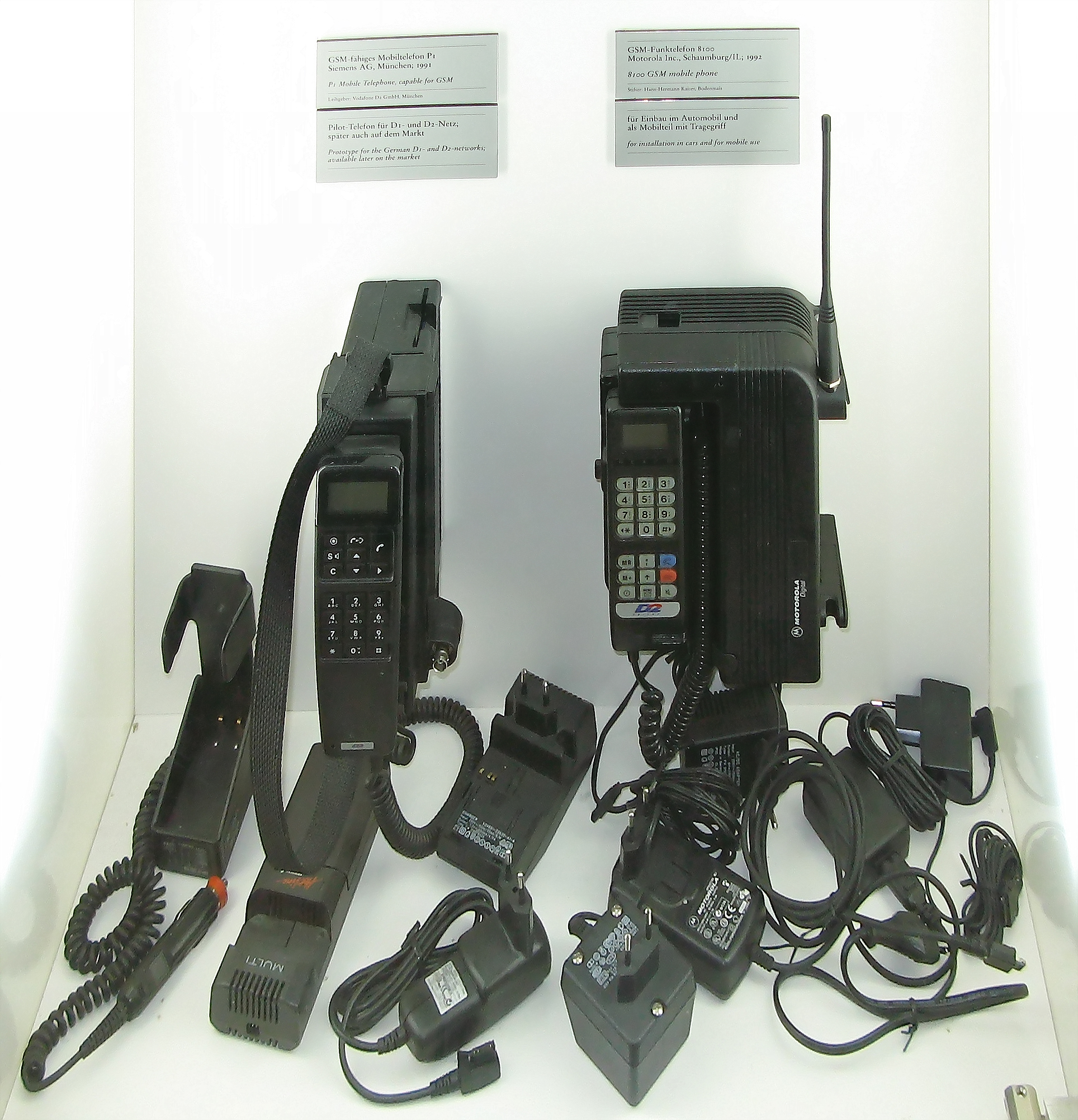
Two 1991 GSM mobile phones with several AC adapters.

In the 1990s, the 'second generation' mobile phone systems emerged. Two systems competed for supremacy in the global market: the European developed GSM standard and the U.S. developed CDMA standard. These differed from the previous generation by using digital instead of analog transmission, and also fast out-of-band phone-to-network signaling. The rise in mobile phone usage as a result of 2G was explosive and this era also saw the advent of prepaid mobile phones.

In 1990, AT&T Bell Labs engineers Jesse Russell, Farhad Barzegar and Can A. Eryaman filed a patent for a digital mobile phone that supports the transmission of digital data. Their patent was cited several years later by Nokia and Motorola when they were developing 2G digital mobile phones.

In 1991, the first GSM network (Radiolinja) launched in Finland. In general, the frequencies used by 2G systems in Europe were higher than those in the United States, though with some overlap. For example, the 900 MHz frequency range was used for both 1G and 2G systems in Europe, so the 1G systems were rapidly closed down to make space for the 2G systems. In the United States, the IS-54 standard was deployed in the same band as AMPS and displaced some of the existing analog channels.

In 1993, IBM Simon was introduced. This was possibly the world's first smartphone. It was a mobile phone, pager, fax machine, and PDA all rolled into one. It included a calendar, address book, clock, calculator, notepad, email, and a touchscreen with a QWERTY keyboard. The IBM Simon had a stylus, used to tap the touch screen. It featured predictive typing that would guess the next characters as you tapped. It had applications, or at least a way to deliver more features by plugging a PCMCIA 1.8 MB memory card into the phone. Coinciding with the introduction of 2G systems was a trend away from the larger "brick" phones toward tiny 100–200 grams (3.5–7.1 oz) hand-held devices. This change was possible not only through technological improvements such as more advanced batteries and more energy-efficient electronics, but also because of the higher density of cell sites to accommodate increasing usage. The latter meant that the average distance transmission from phone to the base station shortened, leading to increased battery life while on the move.

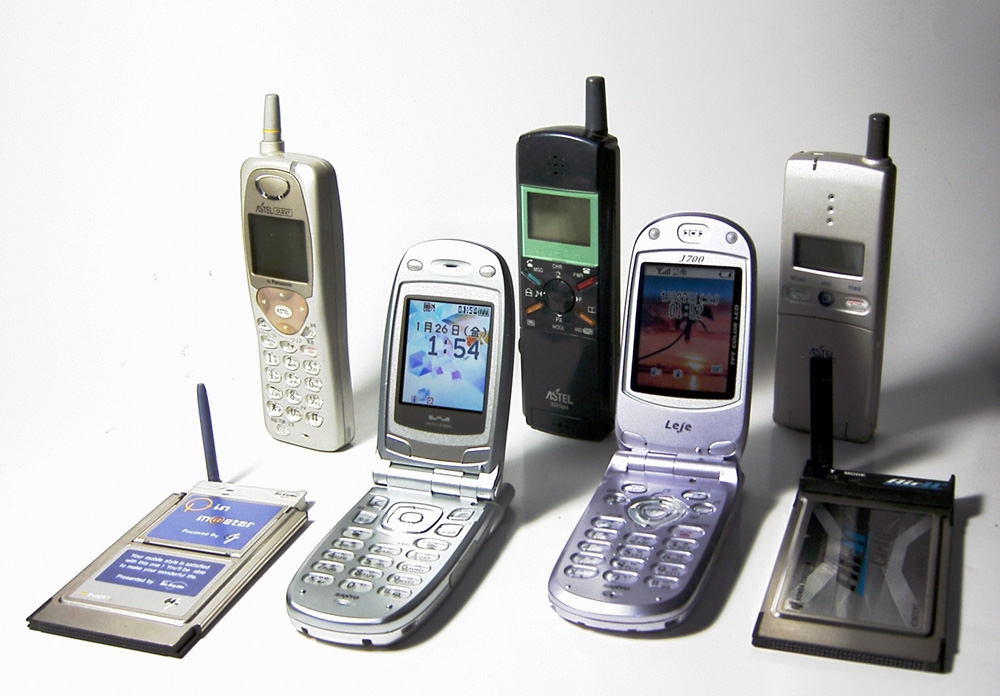
Personal Handy-phone System mobiles and modems from 1997 to 2003.

The second generation introduced a new variant of communication called SMS or text messaging. It was initially available only on GSM networks but spread eventually on all digital networks. The first machine-generated SMS message was sent in the UK on 3 December 1992 followed in 1993 by the first person-to-person SMS sent in Finland. The advent of prepaid services in the late 1990s soon made SMS the communication method of choice among the young, a trend which spread across all ages.

2G also introduced the ability to access media content on mobile phones. In 1998, the first downloadable content sold to mobile phones was the ring tone, launched by Finland's Radiolinja (now Elisa). Advertising on the mobile phone first appeared in Finland when a free daily SMS news headline service was launched in 2000, sponsored by advertising.

Mobile payments were trialed in 1998 in Finland and Sweden where a mobile phone was used to pay for a Coca-Cola vending machine and car parking. Commercial launches followed in 1999 in Norway. The first commercial payment system to mimic banks and credit cards was launched in the Philippines in 1999 simultaneously by mobile operators Globe and Smart.

The first full internet service on mobile phones was introduced by NTT DoCoMo in Japan in 1999.

=== 3G – Mobile broadband ===
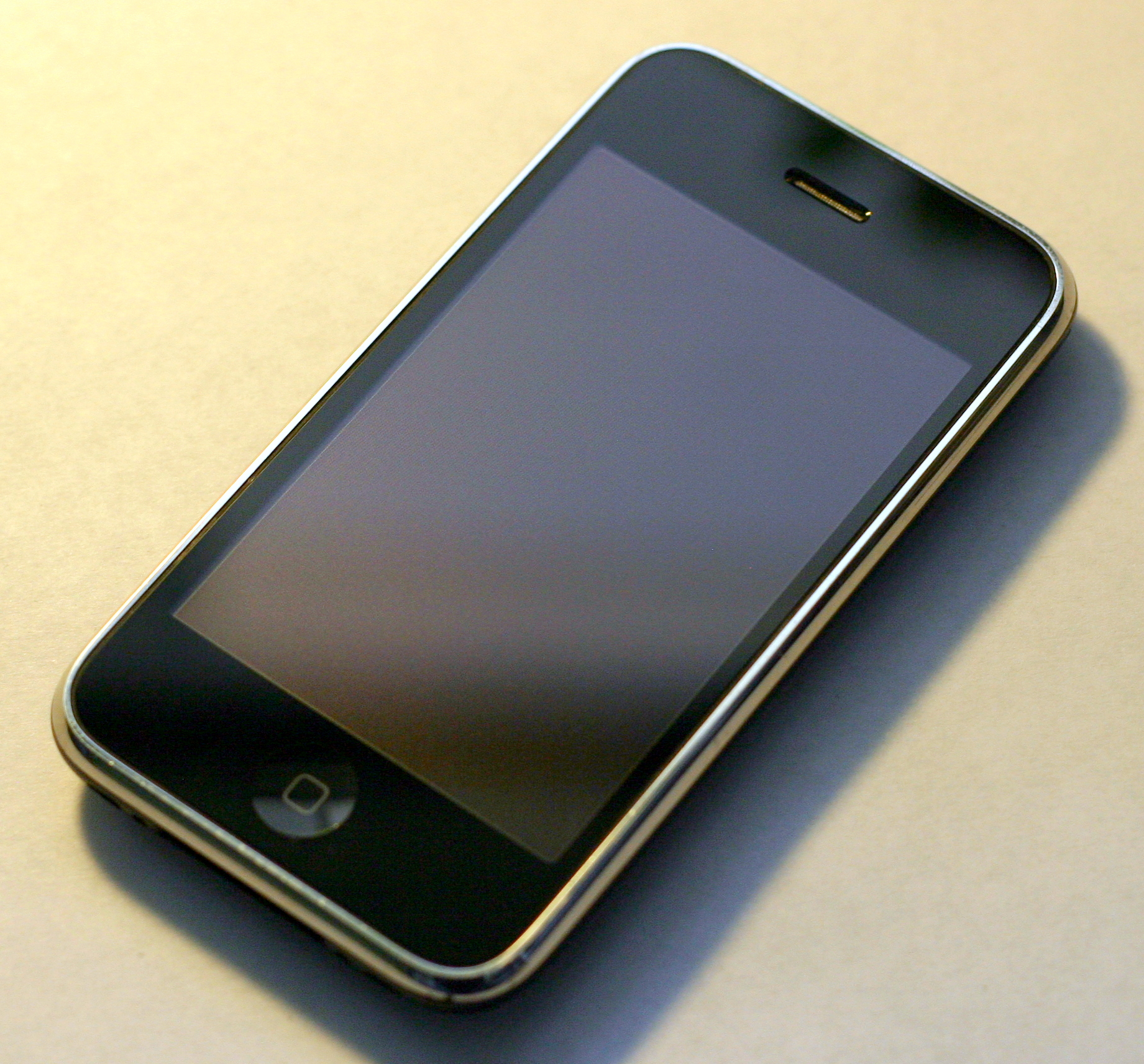
iPhone 3GS.

As the use of 2G phones became more widespread and people began to use mobile phones in their daily lives, it became clear that demand for data (such as access to browse the internet) was growing. Further, experience from fixed broadband services showed there would also be an ever-increasing demand for greater data speeds. The 2G technology was nowhere near up to the job, so the industry began to work on the next generation of technology known as 3G. The main technological difference that distinguishes 3G technology from 2G technology is the use of packet switching rather than circuit switching for data transmission. In addition, the standardization process focused on requirements more than technology (2 Mbit/s maximum data rate indoors, 384 kbit/s outdoors, for example).

Inevitably, this led to many competing standards with different contenders pushing their own technologies, and the vision of a single unified worldwide standard looked far from reality. The standard 2G CDMA networks became 3G compliant with the adoption of Revision A to EV-DO, which made several additions to the protocol while retaining backward compatibility:

- Introduction of several new forward link data rates that increase the maximum burst rate from 2.45 Mbit/s to 3.1 Mbit/s
- Protocols that would decrease connection establishment time
- Ability for more than one mobile to share the same time slot
- Introduction of QoS flags

All these were put in place to allow for low latency, low bit rate communications such as VoIP.

The first pre-commercial trial network with 3G was launched by NTT DoCoMo in Japan in the Tokyo region in May 2001. NTT DoCoMo launched the first commercial 3G network on 1 October 2001, using the WCDMA technology. In 2002, the first 3G networks on the rival CDMA2000 1xEV-DO technology were launched by SK Telecom and KTF in South Korea, and Monet in the US. Monet has since gone bankrupt. By the end of 2002, the second WCDMA network was launched in Japan by Vodafone KK (now Softbank). European launches of 3G were in Italy and the UK by Three/Hutchison group, on WCDMA. 2003 saw a further eight commercial launches of 3G, six more on WCDMA and two more on the EV-DO standard.

During the development of 3G systems, 2.5G systems such as CDMA2000 1x and GPRS were developed as extensions to existing 2G networks. These provide some of the features of 3G without fulfilling the promised high data rates or full range of multimedia services. CDMA2000-1X delivers theoretical maximum data speeds of up to 307 kbit/s. Just beyond these is the EDGE system which in theory covers the requirements for 3G system, but is so narrowly above these that any practical system would be sure to fall short.

The high connection speeds of 3G technology enabled a transformation in the industry: for the first time, media streaming of radio (and even television) content to 3G handsets became possible, with companies such as RealNetworks and Disney among the early pioneers in this type of offering.

In the mid-2000s, an evolution of 3G technology began to be implemented, namely High-Speed Downlink Packet Access (HSDPA). It is an enhanced 3G (third generation) mobile telephony communication protocol in the High-Speed Packet Access (HSPA) family, also coined 3.5G, 3G+ or turbo 3G, which allows networks based on Universal Mobile Telecommunications System (UMTS) to have higher data transfer speeds and capacity. Current HSDPA deployments support down-link speeds of 1.8, 3.6, 7.2 and 14.0 Mbit/s.

By the end of 2007, there were 295 million subscribers on 3G networks worldwide, which reflected 9% of the total worldwide subscriber base. About two-thirds of these were on the WCDMA standard and one third on the EV-DO standard. The 3G telecoms services generated over $120 billion of revenues during 2007 and at many markets the majority of new phones activated were 3G phones. In Japan and South Korea the market no longer supplies phones of the second generation.

Although mobile phones had long had the ability to access data networks such as the Internet, it was not until the widespread availability of good quality 3G coverage in the mid-2000s (decade) that specialized devices appeared to access the mobile web. The first such devices, known as "dongles", plugged directly into a computer through the USB port. Another new class of device appeared subsequently, the so-called "compact wireless router" such as the Novatel MiFi, which makes 3G Internet connectivity available to multiple computers simultaneously over Wi-Fi, rather than just to a single computer via a USB plug-in.

Such devices became especially popular for use with laptop computers due to the added portability they bestow. Consequently, some computer manufacturers started to embed the mobile data function directly into the laptop so a dongle or MiFi was not needed. Instead, the SIM card could be inserted directly into the device itself to access the mobile data services. Such 3G-capable laptops became commonly known as "netbooks". Other types of data-aware devices followed in the netbook's footsteps. By the beginning of 2010, E-readers, such as the Amazon Kindle and the Nook from Barnes & Noble, had already become available with embedded wireless Internet, and Apple had announced plans for embedded wireless Internet on its iPad tablet devices later that year.

Glass screens for IPhones as of 2011 were often cleaned with n-hexane, which poisoned phone plant workers that came into contact with it. In 2012, it was reported that the amount of toxic chemicals in phones had been decreasing.

== 4G – Native IP networks ==
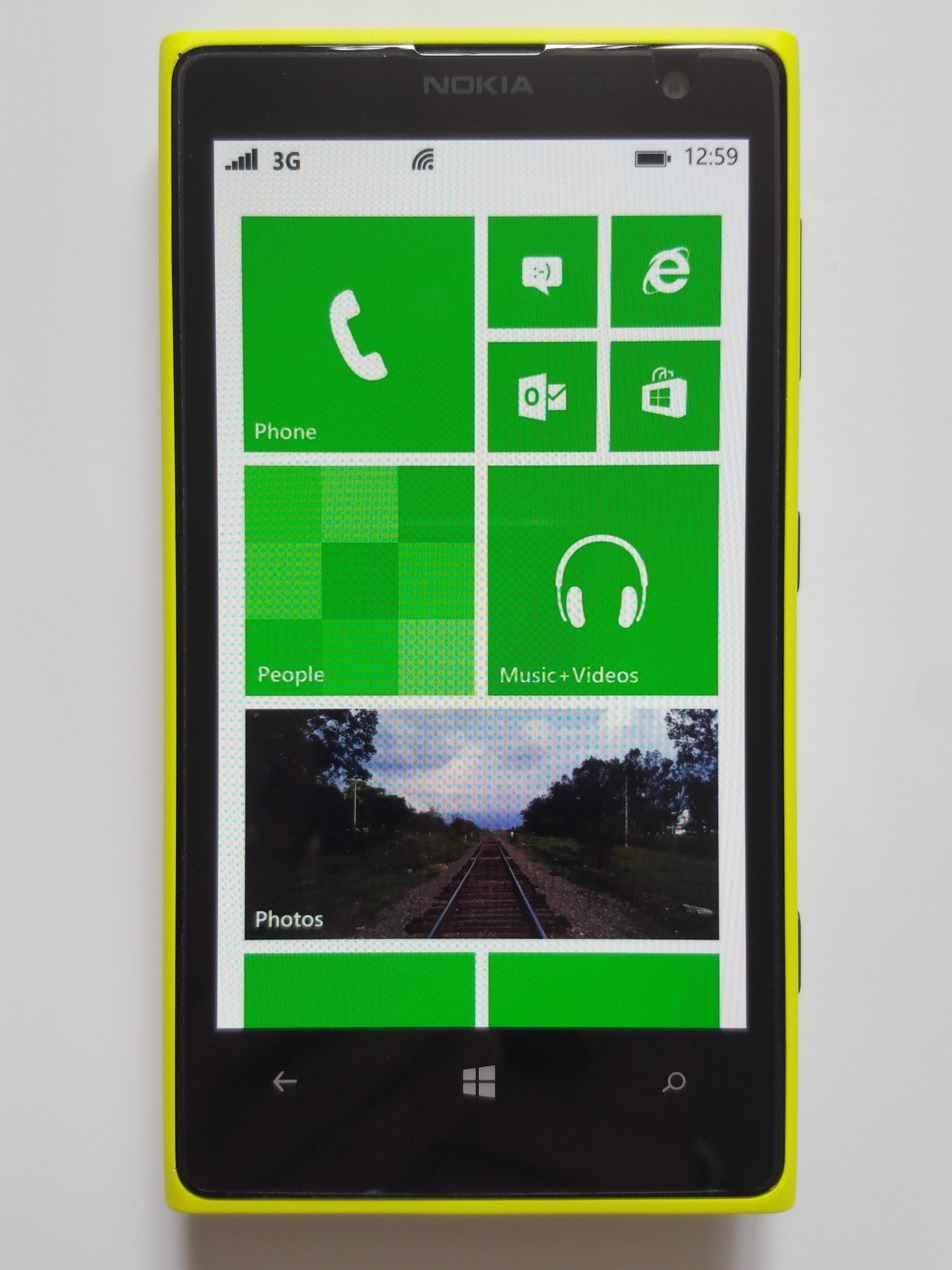
Nokia Lumia 1020.

In 1991, WiLAN founders Hatim Zaghloul and Michel Fattouche invented wideband orthogonal frequency-division multiplexing (WOFDM), the basis for wideband wireless communication applications, including 4G mobile communications.

By 2009, it had become clear that, at some point, 3G networks would be overwhelmed by the growth of bandwidth-intensive applications, such as streaming media. Consequently, the industry began looking to data-optimized fourth-generation (4G) technologies, with the promise of speed improvements up to ten-fold over existing 3G technologies. The first publicly available LTE service was launched in Scandinavia by TeliaSonera, in 2009. In the 2010s, a 4G technology has found diverse applications across various sectors, showcasing its versatility in delivering high-speed wireless communication, such as mobile broadband, internet of things (IoT), fixed wireless access, and multimedia streaming (including music, video, radio, and television).

One of the main ways in which 4G differed technologically from 3G was in its elimination of circuit switching, instead employing an all-IP network. Thus, 4G ushered in a treatment of voice calls just like any other type of streaming audio media, using packet switching over mobile network via VoLTE.

== 5G – Cellular Mobile Communications ==
Samsung Galaxy Z Fold3 5G and Galaxy Z Flip3 5G.

Deployment of fifth-generation (5G) cellular networks commenced worldwide in 2019. The term "5G" was originally used in research papers and projects to denote the next major phase in mobile telecommunication standards beyond the 4G/IMT-Advanced standards. The 3GPP defines 5G as any system that adheres to the 5G NR (5G New Radio) standard. 5G can be implemented in low-band, mid-band or high-band millimeter-wave, with download speeds that can achieve gigabit-per-second (Gbit/s) range, aiming for a network latency of 1 ms. This near-real-time responsiveness and improved overall data performance are crucial for applications like online gaming, augmented and virtual reality, autonomous vehicles, IoT, and critical communication services.

== 6G Network ==
6G is the sixth generation of wireless communication technology currently under research and development, with expected commercial deployment beginning around 2030.

== Satellite telephone ==
A satellite phone is a type of mobile phone that connects to other phones or the telephone network by radio link through satellites orbiting the Earth instead of terrestrial cell sites, as cellphones do. Therefore, they can work in most geographic locations on the Earth's surface, as long as open sky and the line-of-sight between the phone and the satellite are provided. The advantage of a satellite phone is that it can be used in such regions where local terrestrial communication infrastructures, such as landline and cellular networks, are not available. Satellite phones rarely get disrupted by natural disasters on Earth or human actions such as war, so they have proven to be dependable communication tools in emergency and humanitarian situations, when the local communications system have been compromised.

The Inmarsat system is the oldest, originally developed in 1979 for safety of life at sea, and uses a series of satellites in geostationary orbits to cover the majority of the globe. Several smaller operators use the same approach with just one or two satellites to provide a regional service. An alternative approach is to use a series of low Earth orbit satellites much closer to Earth. This is the basis of the Iridium and Globalstar satellite phone services.

=== Integration into conventional mobile phones ===
In the early 2020s, manufacturers began to integrate satellite connectivity into smartphone devices for use in remote areas, out of the cellular network range. These satellite-to-phone services, sometimes called D2C (Direct To Cellular), use L band frequencies, which are compatible with most modern handsets. However, due to the antenna limitations in the conventional phones, in the early stages of implementation satellite connectivity is limited to satellite messaging and satellite emergency services.

In 2022, the Apple iPhone 14 started supporting sending emergency text messages via Globalstar satellites. In 2023, the Apple iPhone 15 added satellite communication with roadside service in the United States. In 2022, T-Mobile formed a partnership to use Starlink services via existing LTE spectrum, expected in late 2024. In 2022, AST SpaceMobile started building a 3GPP standard-based cellular space network to allow existing, unmodified smartphones to connect to satellites in areas with coverage gaps. In 2023, Qualcomm announced Snapdragon Satellite, the service that will allow supported cellphones, starting with Snapdragon 8 Gen 2 chipset, to send and receive text messages via 5G non-terrestrial networks (NTN). In 2024, Iridium introduced Project Stardust, a standard-based satellite-to-cellphone service supported via NB-IoT for 5G non-terrestrial networks, which will be used over Iridium's existing low-earth orbit satellites. Scheduled for launch in 2026, the service provides messaging, emergency communications and IoT for devices like cars, smartphones, tablets and related consumer applications.

== Mobile device charger standards ==
USB power standards for mobile charger
Port	Current	Voltage	Power (max)
Micro-USB	500 mA	5 V	2.5 W
Micro-USB	1 A	5 V	5 W
Micro-USB	2 A	5 V	10 W
USB-C	100 mA to 3 A	5 V	15 W
USB-C	1.7 A to 3 A	9 V	27 W
USB-C	1.8 A to 3 A	15 V	45 W
USB-C	2.25 A to 5 A	20 V	100 W

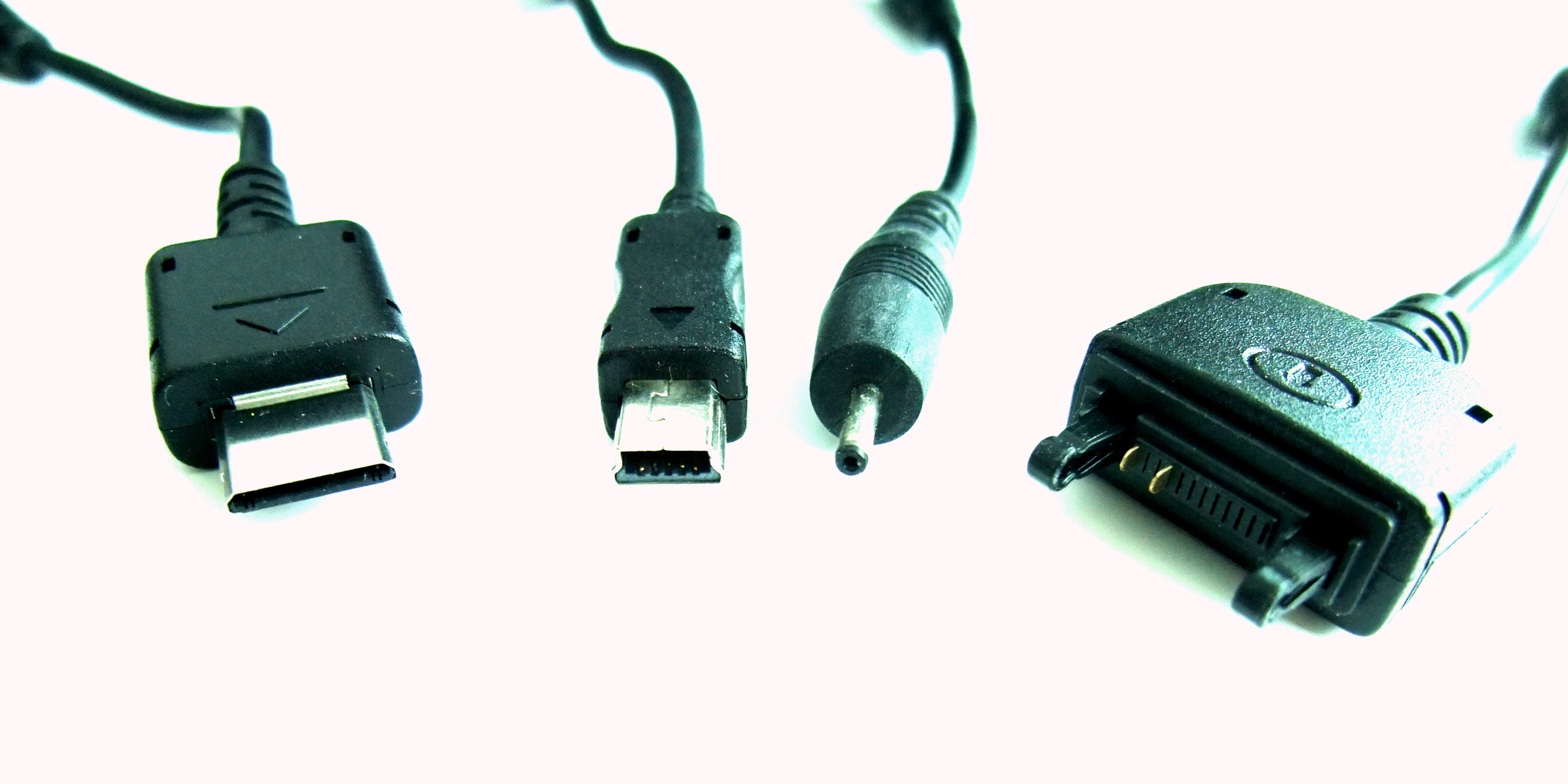
Mobile phone charger plugs prior to the universal standard (left to right) Samsung E900, Motorola V3, Nokia 6101 and Sony Ericsson K750.

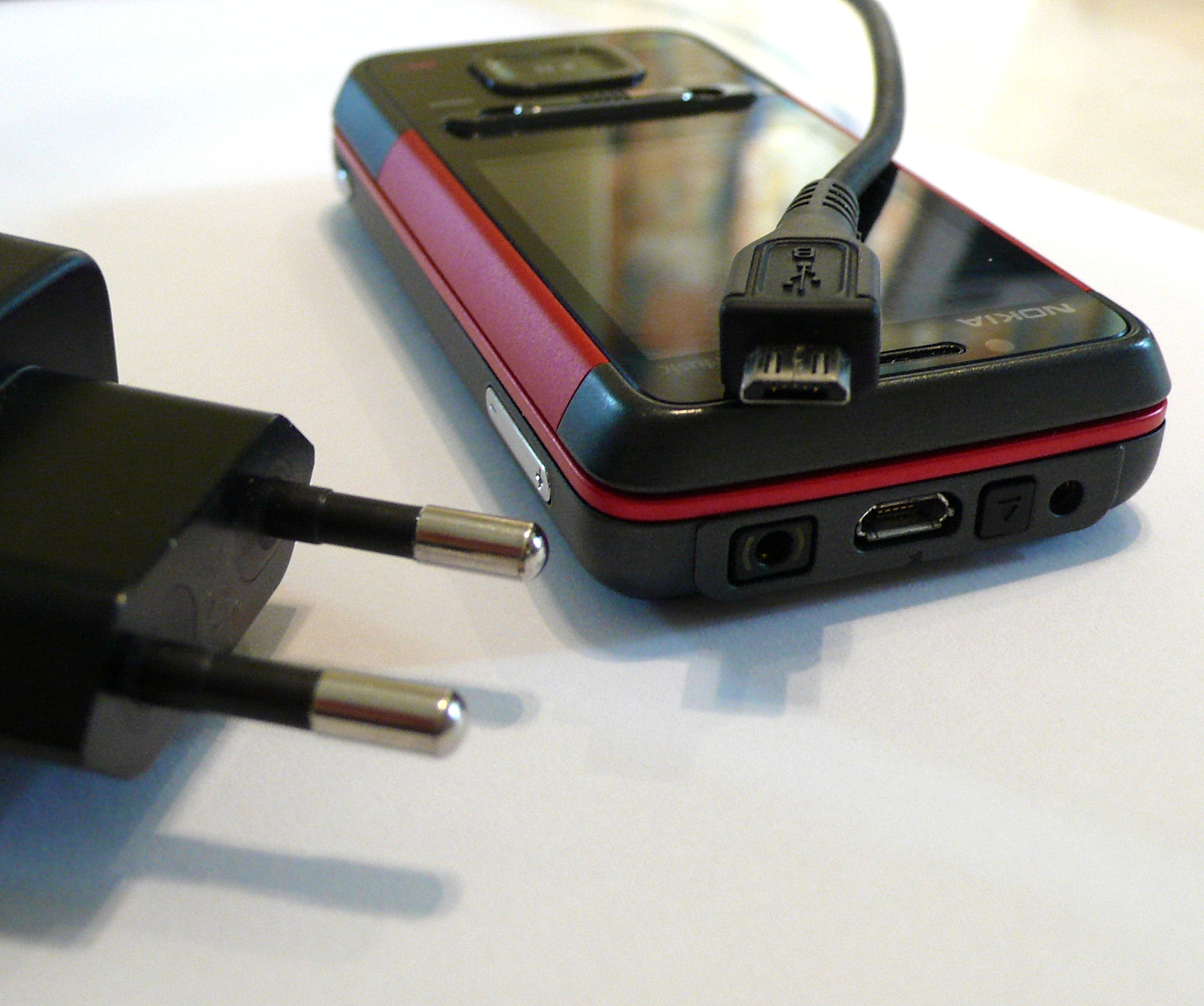
The Micro-USB interface is found on chargers for feature phones and smartphones.

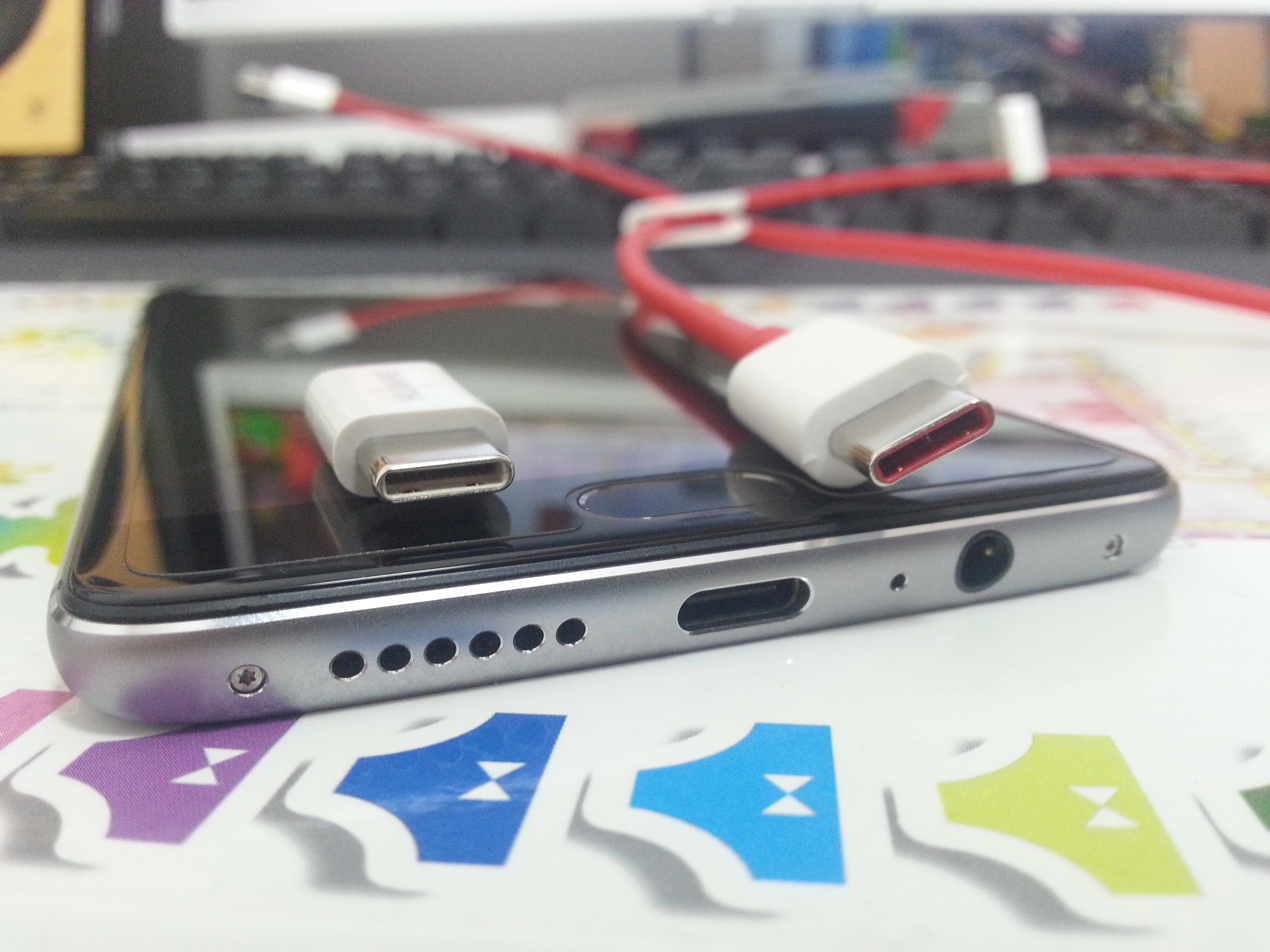
The USB-C interface is increasingly found on (chargers for) smartphones.

Before a universal charger standard was agreed upon in the late 2000s, users needed an adapter which was often proprietary by brand or manufacturer to charge their battery. Later, mobile phones from major brands typically used a USB cable with a micro-USB or, since the mid-2010s, USB-C interface. Apple's iPhone was the sole major brand to retain its own interface (30-pin dock connector replaced by Lightning in 2012). In 2023, Apple's iPhone 15 series finally made the switch to USB-C; since then, all major brands used USB-C as the charger.

=== In China ===
As of 14 June 2007, all new mobile phones applying for a license in China are required to use a USB port as a power port for battery charging. This was the first standard to use the convention of shorting D+ and D−.

=== OMTP/GSMA Universal Charging Solution ===
In September 2007, the Open Mobile Terminal Platform group (a forum of mobile network operators and manufacturers such as Nokia, Samsung, Motorola, Sony Ericsson, and LG) announced that its members had agreed on Micro-USB as the future common connector for mobile devices.

The GSM Association (GSMA) followed suit on 17 February 2009, and on 22 April 2009, this was further endorsed by the CTIA – The Wireless Association, with the International Telecommunication Union (ITU) announcing on 22 October 2009 that it had also embraced the Universal Charging Solution as its "energy-efficient one-charger-fits-all new mobile phone solution," and added: "Based on the Micro-USB interface, UCS chargers will also include a 4-star or higher efficiency rating—up to three times more energy-efficient than an unrated charger."

=== EU smartphone power supply standards ===
In June 2009, many of the world's largest mobile phone manufacturers signed an EC-sponsored Memorandum of Understanding (MoU), agreeing to make most data-enabled mobile phones marketed in the European Union compatible with a common external power supply (common EPS). The EU's common EPS specification (EN 62684:2010) references the USB Battery Charging Specification and is similar to the GSMA/OMTP and Chinese charging solutions. In January 2011, the International Electrotechnical Commission (IEC) released its version of the (EU's) common EPS standard as IEC 62684:2011.

In 2022, the Radio Equipment Directive 2021/0291 required new smartphones to use USB-C as a universal charger by the end of 2024, and laptops by 2026.

== See also ==
- Camera phone
- The Mobile Revolution
- Autopatch
- History of prepaid mobile phones
- History of the telephone
- List of best-selling mobile phones
- Personal Communications Service PCS
- Pager
- Babylonokia
- SIM card
- Smartphone § History
