= History of prepaid mobile phones =

The history of prepaid mobile phones began in the 1990s when mobile phone operators sought to expand their market reach. Up until this point, mobile phone services were exclusively offered on a postpaid basis (contract-based), which excluded individuals with poor credit ratings and minors under the age of 18 (the typical age of contractual agreements). In early 1991, Kenneth Johnson of Queens, New York, along with Mark Feldman, Pedro Diaz and Kevin Lambright of Alicomm Mobile, was the first to successfully create a prepaid cellular phone and Network. His company expanded to a Sales force from Maine to Florida. Two years later, others would come out with similar systems.

Prepaid mobile phones are used around the world.

== First US installation ==
A patent for prepaid mobile phones (Patent Number 5826185) was filed on November 16, 1994. Among the first, if not the first large metropolitan area implementation of prepaid mobile phone service in the United States was in the early 1990s at Houston Cellular Telephone Company, Houston, TX. HCTC was then an independent wireless carrier owned jointly by PacBell and BellSouth. HCTC introduced a service offering branded "calltrac" based on Voice Systems Technology, Inc.'s telephony platform with RPAC-2 billing during the first quarter of 1994.

HCTC initially offered prepaid mobile phone as a non-advertised alternative way to provide service to the more than 40% of cash-carrying, walk-in consumers who were being denied cellular service each day due to lack of credit. The plan was very expensive for the day, most subscription plans were double that of their postpaid subscribers and the prepaid subscriber still had to pay for their equipment (handsets) and anticipated call usage up front. HCTC used the Calltrack prepaid cellular program as a credit development vehicle until they developed subscriber reports intended to show that "Calltrack" was not a profitable venture.

The reports showed that a Calltrack prepaid subscriber was actually more profitable than their traditional postpaid subscribers by a huge margin. This was because, at that time it cost an average of 17% of their gross proceeds to collect on their bad debt postpaid subscribers, plus HCTC paid for all the postpaid handsets. HCTC was poised to become the first U.S carrier to go primarily prepaid, but it did not happen. Voice Systems Technology Inc. was sold to Boston Communications Group (BCGI) and the subsequent sale of prepaid cellular platforms in the US was immediately curtailed and the prepaid cellular service bureau was born. U.S Carriers spent several years trying to catch-up and develop their own solutions but patent litigation has kept prepaid from becoming the dominant form of payment.

== Early providers ==
The possibility of "prepaid wireless" in the United States actually came from Judge Green's decision to break up AT&T's monopoly. Prior to the 1968 Carterfone decision, AT&T prohibited connecting non-Bell (Western Electric or Bell Labs) ancillary devices to its telecommunications network.

Alicomm Mobile was the first actual successful prepaid cellular in the United States under CEO Kenneth Johnson of Queens, New York in 1991.

The possible third or fourth practical implementation of prepaid wireless came in the United States from a small group of entrepreneurs at Voice Systems Technology, Inc. This product was the core product under Houston Cellular's CallTrac (1994), Boatphone BVI's Prepay (1994), Cable & Wireless Prepay (1997), and BellSouth's first international prepaid wireless product (1996). The first European PAYG deployment was in Portugal in 1995 when Portuguese operator TMN deployed a PAYG solution called MIMO.

In November 1996, Vodacom (South Africa) became the first network to introduce prepaid mobile, under the 'Vodago' package, using an 'Intelligent Network' platform. This made it possible to debit customers' accounts in real time (MyBroadband (2014) 'Great South African inventions'), and led to a dramatic increase in uptake (Computer Business Review (2001) 'Mobile stats snapshot'). In 1998 Vodacom received a "Best GSM Service" award from the GSMA for this (GSMA (nd) 'Global Mobile Awards History').

The concept was further developed by Vodafone UK, who in Oct 1997 launched 'Pay as you Talk', packaging a GSM phone with a prepay tariff, and retailing it in new kinds of mass merchandiser retailers such as Woolworths and Argos and one year later into supermarkets such as Tesco (previously mobile phones had only been sold in specialist phone retailers). Customers could buy the product outright for £149 (reducing to £99 very shortly afterwards) which came with credit and then top up as they needed. Pay as you Talk went on to be the market leading prepay proposition in the UK for many years attracting millions of new mobile customers.

The concept was also developed by Eircell (then owned by incumbent Telecom Éireann) in the Republic of Ireland in 1997, as a method of letting different types of people (those under the age of 18, those without bank accounts and those without proof of identity) obtain a mobile phone. Originally limited to one TACS handset, costing £99 upfront, the system was an amazing success, despite the high price of calls and a 7p service charge on every operation. The system was branded as Ready To Go, a name still used by Vodafone, who now own Eircell.

The concept has since been copied in many other countries, with virtually every network in every European country supporting it. On many networks, such as Ireland's Meteor, pay-as-you-go is the main mode of operation, with pay monthly account phones being very much second-class. Conversely, in the United States, account phones offer the best features with pay as you go services being far more restricted in functionality. In developing countries pre-pay tariffs are chosen by the overwhelming majority of subscribers.

== Technical evolution ==
Early solutions to monitor the amount of credit remaining were called "hairpin solutions". They were so called because they connected the caller in and out of a central platform to monitor usage, meaning that it took two extra dedicated trunks on the cellular switch to make one call, one for the inbound connection to the telephony platform and the second back to the switch to complete the call. Trunks were an expensive resource in large metropolitan mobile telephone exchanges and switching equipment did not have the capacity that it has today, so prepaid was relegated to being the second choice for most US carriers.

Modern prepaid mobile phone solutions use out-of-band signaling called the Intelligent Network to monitor the credit without the need for hairpinning trunks. These are developed as international standards which allow prepaid use of a phone all over the world.

== See also ==
- History of mobile phones
- Postpaid mobile phone
