= Douglas Ring =

Douglas Ring may refer to:

- Douglas H. Ring (1907–2000), American engineer, co-inventor of the cell phone
- Doug Ring (Douglas Thomas Ring, 1918–2003), Australian cricketer
