= Yoshihisa Okumura =

Japanese engineer (1926–2023)

Yoshihisa Okumura (Japanese: 奥村善久; 2 July 1926 – 18 February 2023) was a Japanese engineer, known for development of cellular telephone networks. His radio survey of signal strength as a function of distance as measured in drive tests in automobiles was critical to the system planning of mobile radio telephone systems.

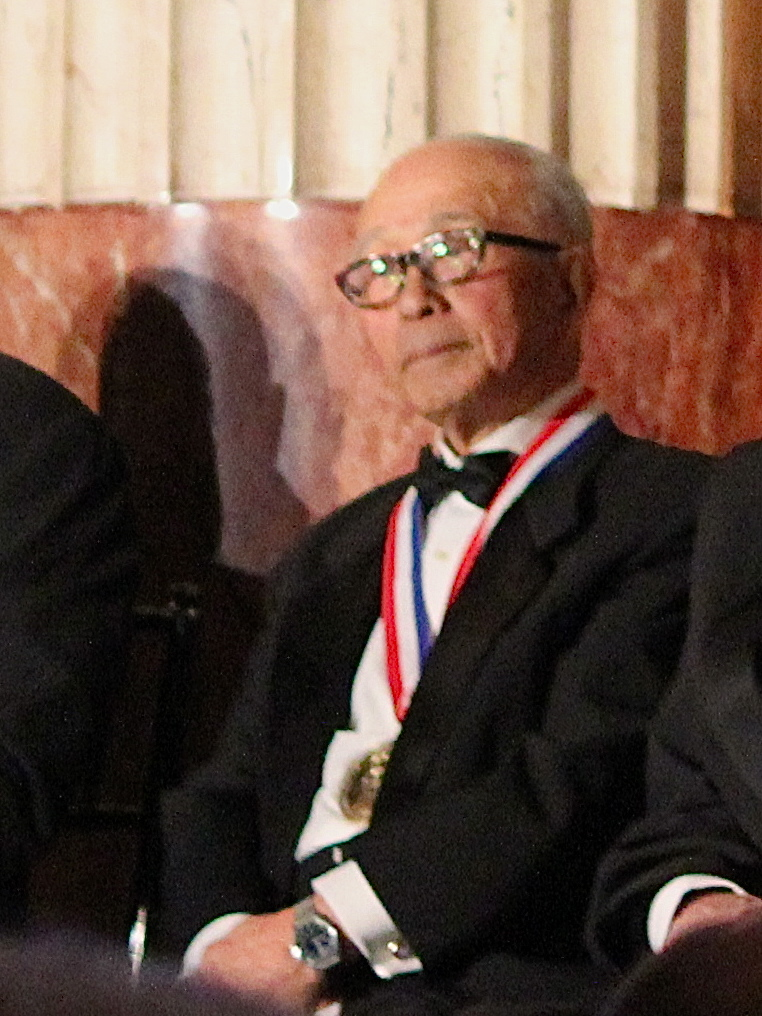
Okumura at the (US) National Academy of Engineering presentation of the 2013 Charles Stark Draper Prize

== Professional career ==
Okumura was born in Isikawa Prefecture on 2 July 1926. He studied electrical engineering at Kanazawa Technical College (金沢工業専門学校 Kanazawa kōgyō senmon gakkō, formerly the faculty of engineering of Kanazawa University) from 1944 to 1947.

Okumura began his professional career in 1950 with Nippon Telegraph and Telephone Public Corporation (NTT, now privatised), where he collected radio propagation data in the 150 to 1920 MHz bands. These bands were later identified as appropriate for mobile phone systems (in no small part, because of the data collected by Okumura).

Okumura's careful study in various topographical environments in metropolitan, suburban, rural and even mountainous regions at distances from 1 to 100 km was published in 1968.

His 10-year survey included varying the height of the antennas from ground level to 10 meters which helps in planning radio coverage of mobile phone cell towers. Okumura's work was advanced in the International Radio Consultative Conference (CCIR) which recognized that this work was applicable to all countries contemplating mobile cellular phone systems. The curves he published have become known as the Okumura Model and were critical to identifying the 800 MHz band as an appropriate target for mobile phone operation.

About 1970, Okumura was promoted to the directorship of the Mobile System Research Section of the Electrical Communication Laboratory (ECL) of NTT. His staff grew to about 20 individuals, who pioneered the early high capacity cellular phone systems.

Okumura retired from the ECL in 1975 and joined Toshiba. In 1979 he became a professor in Kanazawa Institute of Technology, retiring in 2000 as professor emeritus.

Okumura died on 18 February 2023, at the age of 96.

== Awards ==
- Charles Stark Draper Prize (2013) with Joel S. Engel, Martin Cooper, Thomas Haug and Richard H. Frenkiel
