= Overage =

Overage may refer to:

- Cellphone overage charges
- Land-sale overage
- Overaging in metallurgy
- Being above a maximum age
