= Thomas Haug =

Norwegian-Swedish electrical engineer (1927–2023)

Thomas Haug (26 April 1927 – 9 December 2023) was a Norwegian-Swedish electrical engineer known for developing the cellular telephone networks.

== Early life and education ==
Thomas Haug was born in Norway on 26 April 1927. He received a master's degree in Electrical Engineering from the Technical University of Norway in Trondheim in 1951, and a degree of Licentiate from KTH—corresponding to a PhD—from the Royal Institute of Technology in Stockholm in 1973.

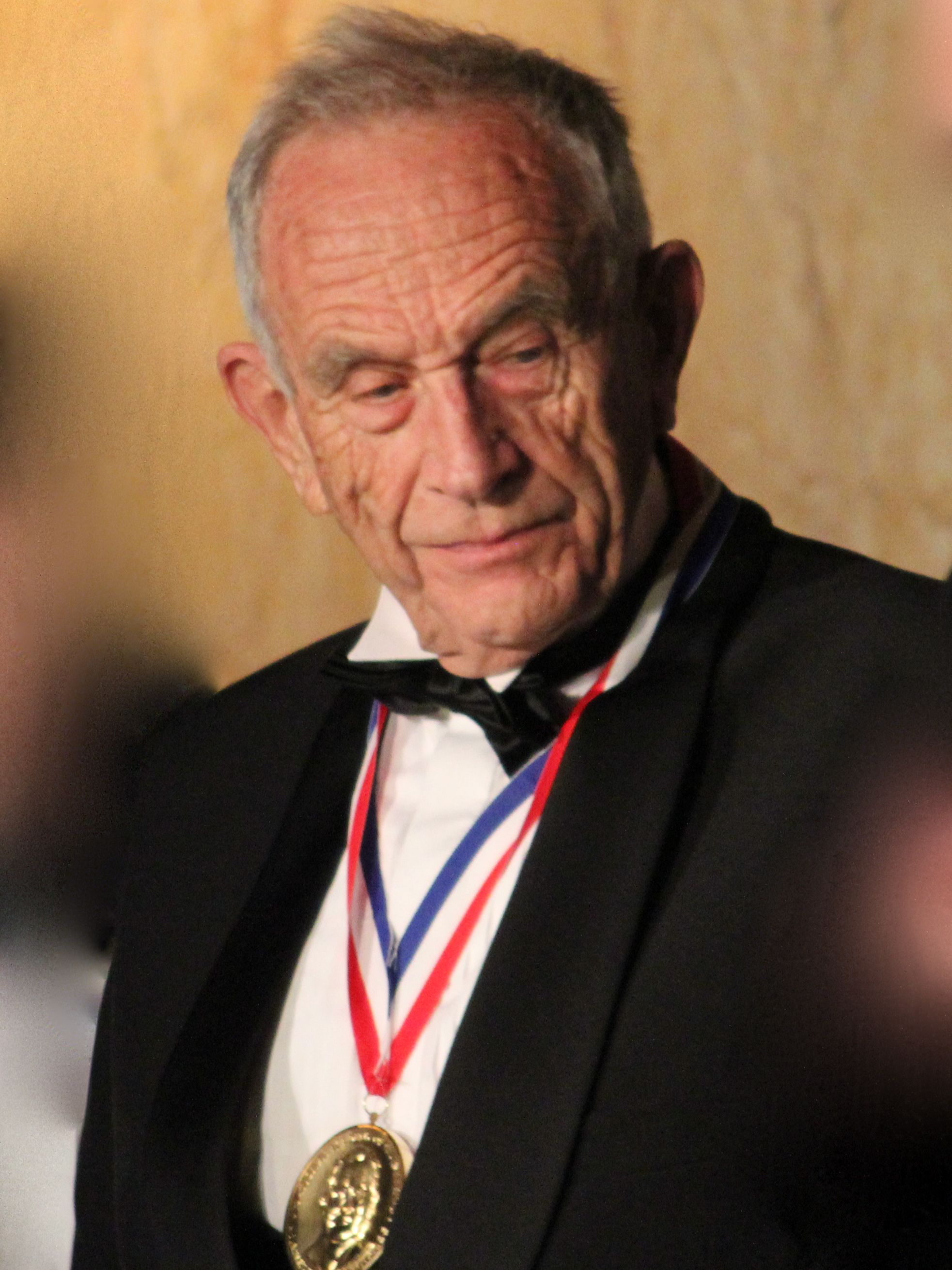
Dr. Thomas Haug at the (US) National Academy of Engineering presentation of the 2013 Charles Stark Draper Prize.

== Professional career ==
Haug worked at the Ericsson group in Stockholm and with Westinghouse in Baltimore, Maryland, USA, primarily on radio projects. In 1966 Haug joined the Swedish Board of Telecommunications where, together with Östen Mäkitalo and lead the joint Nordic project for cellular communications called the Nordic Mobile Telephone (NMT) system. NMT was an analog mobile phone system commercialized in 1980 in Saudi Arabia and throughout the Nordic countries through 1982, reaching 1 million subscribers in 1990. The NMT system enabled roaming among countries and lead the way to the common European System (GSM). Thomas Haug chaired from 1981 to 1992 the steering committee of experts that standardized the GSM system, first at the CEPT and from 1988 at the ETSI. Haug's personal contributions included introducing features such as SIM cards and SMS messaging. Haug remained chair of the standards work through 1992 when GSM was introduced to the market. GSM and its progeny (UMTS and LTE) is the world's leading mobile air interface with networks operating in more than 220 countries. He, along with Philippe Dupuis received the James Clerk Maxwell Medal in 2018. Prince William presented the award to them in Edinburgh for their contributions to the first digital mobile telephone standard.

== Death ==
Haug died in Sollentuna, Sweden on 9 December 2023, at the age of 96.

== Awards ==
Haug received, together with Mäkitalo, the Gold Medal of IVA (the Royal Swedish Academy of Engineering Sciences) in 1987. He further received the Philip Reiss Medal from the Federal German Ministry of Post and Telecommunications in 1993 and the Eduard Rhein Prize from the Eduard Rhein Foundation in 1997.

- Charles Stark Draper Prize 2013 with Joel S. Engel, Martin Cooper, Yoshihisa Okumura and Richard H. Frenkiel
