= Box breaker =

Retail practice

The term box breaker pertains to the mobile phone industry; where there are companies or individuals that exploit the networks' use of discounts on handsets to create their own profitable business.

== Business model ==
Mobile phone networks fundamentally have three different ways to connect customers to the network, each of which needs a SIM-card that locks the user to the network, and provides for a mobile phone number to be associated with a handset: contract, prepaid, or SIM-only. Contract customers are committed to a minimum monthly payment for perhaps 18 months, and generally get their choice of any telephone handset. Prepaid customers have a more limited choice of handsets, also tied to the operator, but they can stop being a customer whenever they like. SIM-only customers simply buy a SIM card and put it into a handset that they already own, and again can leave whenever they like.

There has been a huge growth in the prepaid business in the last few years, and the prepaid handset business has become particularly competitive, with the handsets sold through every kind of outlet, including supermarkets and online. The increase in competition has driven prices of handsets down. For example, one could buy a GSM handset over the counter for $20 in the United States.

Mobile phone operators sell their own branded version of prepaid handsets, bundled with a SIM-card. The handsets are priced at a discount to make them more attractive. The assumption is that a customer will buy the handset, and then activate with the SIM-card in the pack, which will eventually lead to the operator making money via top-ups on the phone. Box breakers subvert this by buying the phones, and unlocking the phone (SIM lock) so that it can be used with any SIM-card, i.e. on any network. Unlocked phones command higher resale prices, so can then be sold on at a profit, and can even be used by contract customers. Additionally, online marketplaces (like eBay) enable box breakers to operate internationally and exploit fluctuations in currencies and price differences between countries.

Historically, box breakers have been procuring a large number of handsets directly from handset retailers stores that eventually suffer revenue losses from box-breaker practices. While chains like O2 and Carphone Warehouse have clamped-down on sales to box-breakers, there are many other outlets, including catalogue stores and supermarkets that have not addressed this phenomenon.

Mobile phone handsets that are in high demand - especially models that are region-exclusive - are prime targets of box breakers. Handsets can be bought as prepaid, unlocked, and then shipped to the target market for a profit. This grey-market activity is a problem both for handset vendors and for network operators.
