= C. Grant Willson =

Chemist

Carlton Grant Willson is a professor at the University of Texas at Austin.

== Early life and education ==
He received his B.S. in chemistry from the University of California, Berkeley in 1962, an M.S. in organic chemistry from San Diego State University in 1969, and a Ph.D. in organic chemistry from the University of California, Berkeley in 1973.

== Career ==
Prior to joining the University of Texas in 1993, Willson worked as an IBM Fellow and Manager of Polymer Science and Technology at the IBM Almaden Research Center in San Jose, California. He also has held faculty positions at the California State University, Long Beach, and the University of California, San Diego.

== Research ==
Willson's research focuses on the design and synthesis of functional organic materials, with a particular emphasis on microelectronics applications. This includes work on liquid crystalline materials, polymeric non-linear optical materials, and novel photoresist materials.

== Selected publications ==
- Frechet, J. M. J. Ito, H. Willson, C. G. Sensitive Deep UV Resist Incorporating Chemical Amplification. Proceedings Microcircuit Engineering 1982, Grenoble, 260.
- Willson, C. Grant; Ito, Hiroshi; Frechet, J. M. J. “L'amplification chimique appliquee au developpement de polymeres utilisables comme resines de lithographie,” Colloque Internationale sur la Microlithographie: Microcircuit Engineering 82 261 (1982)
- Willson, C. Grant; Ito, Hiroshi; Frechet, Jean M. J.; Houlihan, Frank. “Chemical Amplification in the Design of Polymers for Resist Applications,” International Union of Pure and Applied Chemistry 28 448 (1982)
- Willson, Grant C.; Ito, Hiroshi; Frechet, Jean M. J.; Tessier, Theodore G.; Houlihan, Francis M. “Approaches to the Design of Radiation-Sensitive Polymeric Imaging Systems with Improved Sensitivity and Resolution,” J.Elecrochem.Soc. 133(1) 181-187 (1986)
- MacDonald, Scott A.; Willson, C. Grant; Frechet, Jean M. J. “Chemical Amplification in High-Resolution Imaging Systems,” Accounts of Chemical Research 27(6) 151-158 (1994)

== Awards and recognition ==
- Alexander von Humboldt Award (1988)
- ACS Award in the Chemistry of Materials(1991)
- Fellow of the National Academy of Engineering (1992)
- Malcolm E. Pruitt Award (1997)
- National Academy of Sciences Award for Chemistry in Service to Society (1999)
- Applied Polymer Science Award from ACS (2001)
- Photopolymer Science and Technology Award (Japan, 2003)
- Dehon Little Award from the American Institute of Chemical Engineers (AIChE, 2005)
- Zernike Award from SPIE (2005)
- SEMI North America Award (2007)
- National Medal of Technology (2008)
- Gordon E. Moore Medal (2009)
- Fellow of the American Chemical Society (2009)
- Japan Prize (2013)
- Charles Stark Draper Prize (2020)
