= The Mobile Revolution =

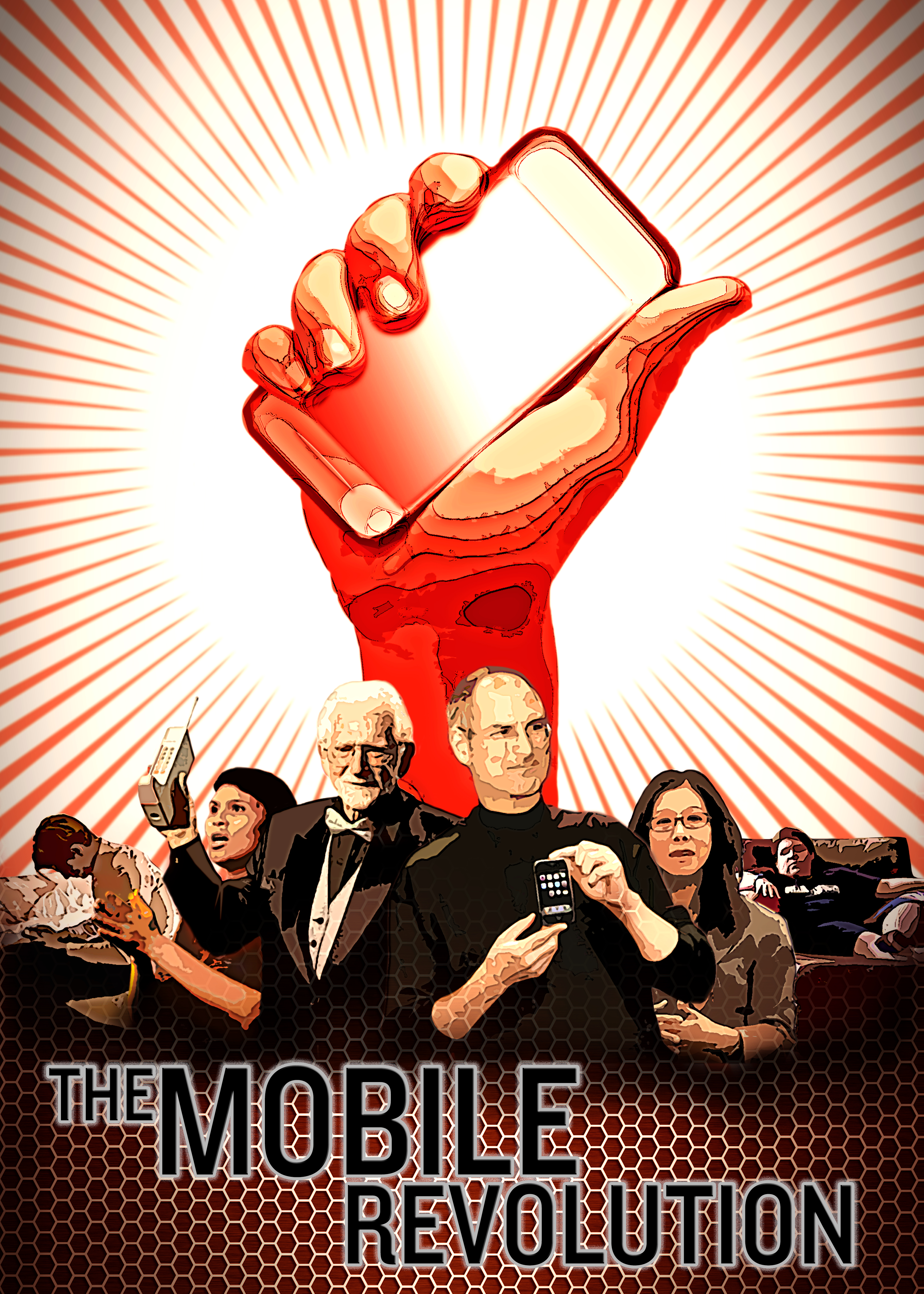
- Press poster
- Directed by: Magnus Sjöström
- Written by: Magnus Sjöström
- Produced by: UR Swedish Educational Broadcasting Company
- Starring: See below
- Cinematography: Niclas Juho Jensen
- Edited by: Bernard Lebourne
- Music by: Thomas Tjärnkvist
- Distributed by: Java Films
- Release date: 17 December 2014
- Running time: 58 minutes
- Country: Sweden
- Language: English

The Mobile Revolution is a 2014 Swedish documentary written and directed by Magnus Sjöström about the history of the cell phone and how it has impacted human behaviour and society.

The documentary was produced by UR, The Swedish Educational Broadcasting Company and was broadcast by SVT in December 2014. It has since also aired in Spain.

== Content ==
Scenes from the film feature Richard Frenkiel returning to Bell Labs in Holmdel, New Jersey where the basic cellular technology was developed, Martin Cooper of Motorola explaining how he made the world's first call in public from a cellular phone and Jorma Ollila describing how Nokia pioneered the transition from analog to digital cell phones.

The documentary also features segments describing the effect of camera phones on journalism, the development and impact of the first iPhone and security hazards related to smartphones.

The film ends with a discussion about the consequences of being constantly connected. The filmmakers visit a "rehab camp" for young people with technology addiction outside Seattle and also meet with Danny Bowman, Great Britain's first diagnosed "selfie addict".

== Cast ==
- Richard Frenkiel as himself
- Martin Cooper as himself
- Jorma Ollila as himself
- Mizuko Ito as herself
