= Cellphone overage charges =

Charges billed due to overuse of a phone plan

Overage charges are incurred when a mobile phone (cellphone) is used for more time than the quota fixed under a post-paid plan.

== Payment plans and overage charges ==
Billing for mobile phones can take the form of either a pre-paid plan or a post-paid plan. In a pre-paid plan, the cell phone user pays for the minutes before using them. This kind of plan is popular in many Asian, South American, and some European countries.

In post-paid plans, the cell phone user pays at the end of the month for the minutes used during that month. Post-paid plans are common in North America. The cell phone providers (that is, the wireless carriers) typically charge a monthly fee for the post-paid plans. In turn, users get a monthly quota of minutes. When a user goes over the minutes allowed under the particular post-paid cell phone plan, they are charged separately for the extra minutes. In North America, this fee for the extra minutes is called overage fees or overage charges.

For example, suppose that a mobile phone user signs up for a post-paid cell phone plan that costs $40 per month and is allowed a quota of 700 minutes under that plan. If this user were to end up using 750 minutes in a month, then they would be charged an overage fee for the extra 50 minutes.

Mobile networks may offer the ability to check how much of a quota has been used, or users may sign up to third-party monitoring services. Overage charges are being phased out by some major providers.

== Overage charges in Germany ==
In Germany as of 2015, most post-paid cell phone plans are (for calls within Germany) either true flat rates (monthly rates between 17 and 40 EUR, depending on how much data and how many SMS are included) or include a more limited amount of included minutes (100-200 Minutes), with a modest overage of 7 to 21 Euro-cent per minute. The time of days is not accounted for.

== Overage charges in North American countries ==
North American post-paid cell phone plans typically divide the minutes used in various categories such as peak minutes, evening and night minutes (also called off-peak minutes), weekend minutes, mobile-to-mobile minutes, and so on. The peak minutes also go by the name of "anytime minutes" or "whenever minutes".

The peak minutes allowed under most post-paid plans are usually limited (such as 750 peak minutes allowed in a month for $40 per month) and minutes in all other categories are either free, or come with a large monthly quota (such as 5000 weekend and weeknight minutes). Therefore, in North American countries, the overage charges typically mean "peak overage charges", that is, a cell phone user gets charged separately for the extra peak minutes used in a month.

== See also ==
- History of mobile phones
- Mobile phone operator
