= W. Rae Young =

One of the inventors of the mobile phone (1915–2008)

W. Rae Young in 2006.

William Rae Young, Jr. (October 30, 1915 – March 7, 2008) was one of the Bell Labs engineers that invented the cell phone.

The history of cellular phone technology began on December 11, 1947 with a Bell Labs internal memo written by Douglas H. Ring describing the idea of Rae Young of the hexagonal cell concept for a cellular mobile telephone system.

== Career ==
Young graduated from the University of Michigan in 1937 with a B.S. degree in electrical engineering. After graduation, Young began working at Bell Labs in what became his lifetime employment. Young did research and development for Bell Labs in the fields of radar, television, communication systems, and top-secret military systems. Young lived and worked in New York City for many years until he and his family moved to Summit, New Jersey from which he commuted by train to New York City.

During 1942 to 1945, Young worked on radar and communication systems for the US Armed Services. In 1945, Young began work on mobile radiotelephone systems in vehicles for coverage of urban areas and along highways. He developed systems for reducing interference between mobile systems that are closely spaced in frequency and location. Young served as chairman of a Radio Manufacturers Association (RMA) subcommittee TR8.9 on systems standards for mobile communications equipment.

In 1947, W. Rae Young proposed what are now called cell phones in a report to the RMA Systems Committee. Coworker Douglas H. Ring at Bell Labs, liked Young's idea about locating many mobile phone towers in a hexagonal cellular arrangement throughout each city so that every mobile phone user would be able to communicate from at least one cell through the telephone system. Douglas Ring credited W. Rae Young with suggesting the hexagonal cell layout and expanded on Rae Young's concept in another internal Technical Memo dated 11 December 1947. In 1951, Young was appointed supervisor of the cellular systems engineering team and later became department head of cellular mobile phone development at Bell Labs.

In the 1950s, Young was transferred to another Bell Labs facility at Murray Hill, New Jersey where he worked on communications systems and formulated requirements for design of telephone switching systems and data-transmission systems. In 1962, he was transferred to another Bell Labs facility at Holmdel, New Jersey.

In 1964, W. Rae Young was made an IEEE Fellow “for contributions to mobile radio and data communications systems”.

After working for Bell Labs for 47 years, he retired in June 1979.

== Family ==
Rae Young Jr. was born in Lawton, Michigan, a small rural town. He was the eldest of 4 children: 3 boys and a girl. Rae's father William Rae Young Sr. was a medical doctor. Rae's mother Elizabeth Emerson was also college educated and was descended from the Ralph Waldo Emerson family.

In February, 1937 Rae Young Jr. married Mary Lou Traywick (1915–1975) during their senior year at the University of Michigan. They had three children: Roy, Susan, and Barbara, each of whom earned a doctorate degree.

Rae Young Jr. played piano, clarinet, cello, and bass with the Summit Symphony Orchestra, New Jersey Symphony Orchestra, and the Monmouth Symphony Orchestra for over 40 years.

Rae's wife Mary Lou died from cancer just before her 60th birthday.

In 1980, Rae met a widow Betty Wood, a retired crystallographer from Bell Labs. For the next 27 years Rae and Betty were constant companions until her death in March 2006. Rae was 92 when he died.

== Publications of Rae Young ==
- "Interference between VHF Radio Communications Circuits". IRE Proceedings, July 1948.
- "Ratio of Frequency Swing to Phase Swing in Phase and Frequency Modulation Systems Transmitting Speech", by D. K. Gannett and W. R. Young, IRE Proceedings, March 1949.
- "Echos in Transmission at 450 Mc. [MHz] from Land to Car Radio Units", W. R. Young and L. Y. Lacy, IRE Proceedings, March 1950.
- "Comparison of Mobile Radio Transmission at 150, 450, 900 & 3700 mc" [mHz], Bell System Technical Journal, vol 32, pages 1068–1085, November 1952.
- "AMPS: Introduction, Background, and Objectives", Bell System Technical Journal, vol. 58, 1, pages 1–14, January 1979.

== See also ==
- History of mobile phones
- Douglas H. Ring

== Patents of W. Rae Young ==
- U.S. patent 4,399,555 -- Cellular High Capacity Mobile Radio Telephone System, filed April 28, 1980

Young was granted more than 14 patents.
