= John Francis Mitchell =

American electronics engineer

John F. Mitchell
- John F. Mitchell in 1996
- Born: John Francis Mitchell; January 1, 1928; Chicago, Illinois, United States
- Died: June 9, 2009 (aged 81)
- Education: Illinois Institute of Technology
- Occupations: Executive, engineer
- Employer: Motorola
- Known for: Wireless technology
- Title: Chief Engineer; President & COO; Vice chairman

John Francis Mitchell (January 1, 1928 – June 9, 2009) was an American electronics engineer and president and chief operating officer of Motorola.

Mitchell led the pioneering development and implementation of Motorola's mobile phone technology producing the first portable transistorized pager and cell phone. He was the driving force behind building quality into engineering, and the establishment of the Motorola University and Six Sigma Institute; and launched the global Iridium satellite constellation.

== Family and early years ==
He was born in Chicago, Illinois, the son of Catholic Irish immigrants, William Mitchell of Sligo and Bridget Keane, of Listowel. He was married to Margaret and had three children.

== Radio telephony and the cell phone ==
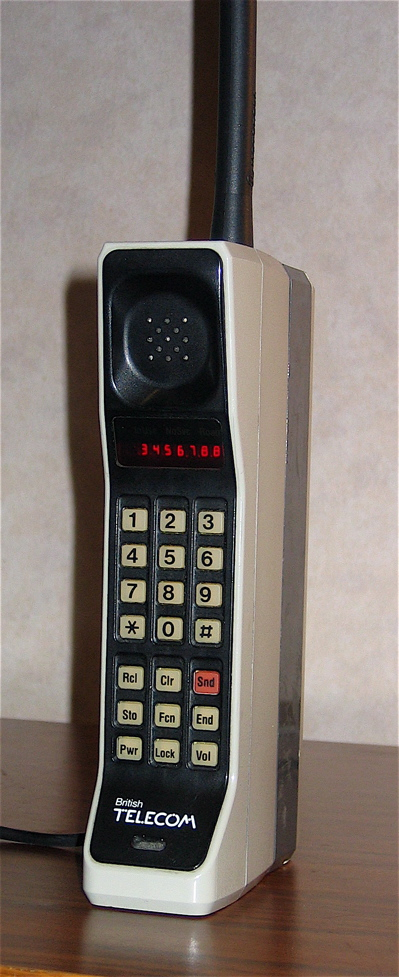
DynaTAC 8000X;1983, $3,995. 13" tall, weighed 30 oz. First commercial portable cell phone. Dubbed the "Boot," later, a slimmer version was called the "Brick." DynaTAC=Dynamic Adaptive Total Area Coverage. -First Patent Shown Here: -Mitchell & DynaTAC, 04/03/73

Mitchell became Motorola's chief engineer for its mobile communication products in 1960. Prior to the development of the cell phone, Mitchell and his team of engineers produced and marketed the first transistorized pager and obtained a patent for the concept of portable cell telephony, including small antennae used to help free mobile phone units from car trunks where they were typically installed.

Mitchell, Motorola's chief of portable communication products and Martin Cooper's boss in 1973, played a key role in advancing the development of handheld mobile telephone equipment. Mitchell successfully pushed Motorola to develop wireless communication products that would be small enough to use anywhere and participated in the design of the cellular phone.

== Other initiatives ==
In 1983, Mitchell was appointed to U.S. President Ronald Reagan's National Security Telecommunications Advisory Committee. He was a senior member of the Institute of Electrical and Electronics Engineers and was a chairman of the Electronic Industries Alliance. He was a recognized expert on world trade, serving as director of the National Association of Manufacturers, and an expert on federal fiscal policy. Mitchell was a director of Bell & Howell Company, a trustee of the Engineering Advisory Council, Marquette University, and an active participant in the Easter Seals (US) Campaign and a member of the President's Council of the American Lung Association. Mitchell was a trustee at Illinois Institute of Technology, the Dublin City University and the University of Limerick Foundation. He was one of the architects, which also included Chuck Feeney, of the huge expansion of the University of Limerick during the 1990s and 2000s through his work on the University of Limerick foundation. As a philanthropist and member of IIT's Philip Danforth Armour Society, Mitchell established endowed scholarship funds for the Camras Program, the Leadership Academy and electrical engineering students. As of 2012, the John F. Mitchell scholarship funds had supported more than 70 students at the university.

== Awards ==
Mitchell was awarded honorary degrees from the Illinois Institute of Technology in humane letters and science, 1995; an honorary doctorate of business administration from Iowa Wesleyan College, on May 18, 1985, and from Dublin City University (Ollscoil Chathair Bhaile Átha Cliath) on October 25, 1996. He was a recipient of the 2003 Chicago Innovation Award. He received from the IIT Alumni Association its award for Professional Achievement in 1985, Alumni Medal in 1994 and Lifetime Achievement Award (posthumous) 2010.

== Patents ==
- U.S. Patent 2,833,994, July 2, 1954, for High Frequency Long-Line Variably End-Loaded with Clarence P. Pipes.
- U.S.Patent 2,912,573, November 10, 1959, for Receiver having frequency and amplitude modulation detecting.
- U.S. Patent 3,087,117, April 23, 1963, for Portable Transmitter Apparatus with Selective.
- U.S. Patent 2,975,274, March 14, 1961, for Frequency Modulation Radio Receiver.
- U.S. Patent 3,126,514, October 13, 1961, for Noise Reducing system with Jack Germain. (Germain retired as director of quality assurance.)
- U.S. Patent 3,906,166, September 16, 1975, for a Radio Telephone System, the cell phone.
- U.S. Patent 5,650,776, July 22, 1997, for a Communications Receiver with Thomas F. Holmes

== See also ==
- History of mobile phones
