= Boston Communications Group =

Boston Communications Group, Inc., more commonly called bcgi, was one of the largest prepaid mobile phone companies in the United States until 2007. In 2005, they settled a patent lawsuit brought by Freedom Wireless, a private intellectual property firm based in Phoenix, Arizona. bcgi and its co-defendant had lost a jury trial, which awarded Freedom $128 million in damages. The co-defendants agreed to collectively pay $87 million, of which bcgi's share was $55 million. The stock price jumped from $2.09 to $4.01 upon news of the settlement, because the lawsuit threatened to drive the company into bankruptcy.

On July 12, 2007, Megasoft Ltd. of Hyderabad, India agreed to purchase bcgi in a tender offer, which was settled a few months later.
