= International mobile remittance =

International mobile remittance (also known as international mobile airtime recharge / international top-up / top-up credit) is a remittance transfer service which allows a person in one country to securely and electronically transfer or top-up mobile credit to another mobile belonging to a family member or friend abroad. The top-up can happen through various payment mechanisms. The sender selects the country, mobile network, number of the recipient, mobile air time amount, and makes the transfer. The mobile air time is credited to the recipient instantly.

== Context ==
The history of international mobile remittances is inextricably linked to the development of the mobile phone and its acceptance globally. Today, international mobile airtime recharge is the most widely used mobile phone remittance service. It accounts for nearly 75% of all mobile remittance transactions. The proliferation of retailers selling mobile airtime remittance services has increased in developing countries, partly due to the growth of various mobile payment solutions. It is easy for workers, friends, and family living or visiting oversea countries to send mobile airtime top-ups from the convenience of their home, mobile device, bank, or local retail store.

== See also ==
- Mobile payments
- Roaming
