= Charles Stark Draper Prize =

Engineering award given by the National Academy of Engineering since 1989

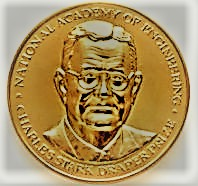
- Presented by: National Academy of Engineering
- Reward: $500,000
- First award: 1989
- Website: Draper Prize

The National Academy of Engineering awards the Charles Stark Draper Prize for Engineering, which is given for the advancement of engineering and the education of the public about engineering. It is one of three prizes that constitute the "Nobel Prizes of Engineering"—the others are the Academy's Russ and Gordon Prizes. The Draper Prize is awarded biennially and the winner of each of these prizes receives $500,000. The Draper Prize is named for Charles Stark Draper, the "father of inertial navigation", an MIT professor and founder of Draper Laboratory.

== Recipients ==
Year	Recipient		Citation	Ref.
Year	Image	Name	Citation	Ref.
1989		Jack S. Kilby	"For their independent development of the monolithic integrated circuit."	
1989		Robert N. Noyce	"For their independent development of the monolithic integrated circuit."	
1991		Hans von Ohain	"For their independent development of the turbojet engine."	
1991		Frank Whittle	"For their independent development of the turbojet engine."	
1993		John W. Backus	"For the development of FORTRAN, the first widely used, general purpose, high-level computer language."	
1995		John R. Pierce	"For their development of communication satellite technology."	
1995	Harold A. Rosen		"For their development of communication satellite technology."	
1997	Vladimir Haensel		"For the development in chemical engineering of the Platforming ™ process."	
1999		Charles K. Kao	"For development of fiber-optic technology."	
1999	Robert D. Maurer		"For development of fiber-optic technology."	
1999	John B. MacChesney		"For development of fiber-optic technology."	
2001		Vinton Cerf	"For the development of the Internet."	
2001		Robert Kahn	"For the development of the Internet."	
2001		Leonard Kleinrock	"For the development of the Internet."	
2001		Lawrence Roberts	"For the development of the Internet."	
2002		Robert S. Langer	"For extraordinary contributions to the bioengineering of revolutionary medical drug delivery systems."	
2003		Bradford W. Parkinson	"For their technological achievements in the development of the Global Positioning System (GPS)."	
2003	Ivan A. Getting		"For their technological achievements in the development of the Global Positioning System (GPS)."	
2004		Alan C. Kay	"For the vision, conception, and development of the first practical networked personal computers."	
2004		Butler W. Lampson	"For the vision, conception, and development of the first practical networked personal computers."	
2004		Robert W. Taylor	"For the vision, conception, and development of the first practical networked personal computers."	
2004		Charles P. Thacker	"For the vision, conception, and development of the first practical networked personal computers."	
2005	Minoru “Sam” Araki		"For the design, development, and operation of Corona, the first space-based Earth observation system."	
2005	Francis J. Madden		"For the design, development, and operation of Corona, the first space-based Earth observation system."	
2005	Edward A. Miller		"For the design, development, and operation of Corona, the first space-based Earth observation system."	
2005		James W. Plummer	"For the design, development, and operation of Corona, the first space-based Earth observation system."	
2005	Don H. Schoessler		"For the design, development, and operation of Corona, the first space-based Earth observation system."	
2006		Willard Boyle	"For the invention of the Charge-Coupled Device (CCD), a light-sensitive component at the heart of digital cameras and other widely used imaging technologies."	
2006		George Smith	"For the invention of the Charge-Coupled Device (CCD), a light-sensitive component at the heart of digital cameras and other widely used imaging technologies."	
2007		Tim Berners-Lee	"For developing the World Wide Web."	
2008		Rudolf Kalman	"For the development and dissemination of the optimal digital technique (known as the Kalman Filter) that is pervasively used to control a vast array of consumer, health, commercial and defense products."	
2009		Robert H. Dennard	"For his invention and contributions to the development of Dynamic Random Access Memory (DRAM), used universally in computers and other data processing and communication systems."	
2011		Frances H. Arnold	"For directed evolution, a method used worldwide for engineering novel enzymes and biocatalytic processes for pharmaceutical and chemical products."	
2011	Willem P.C. Stemmer		"For directed evolution, a method used worldwide for engineering novel enzymes and biocatalytic processes for pharmaceutical and chemical products."	
2012		George H. Heilmeier	"For the engineering development of the Liquid Crystal Display (LCD) utilized in billions of consumer and professional devices."	
2012		Wolfgang Helfrich	"For the engineering development of the Liquid Crystal Display (LCD) utilized in billions of consumer and professional devices."	
2012		Martin Schadt	"For the engineering development of the Liquid Crystal Display (LCD) utilized in billions of consumer and professional devices."	
2012		T. Peter Brody	"For the engineering development of the Liquid Crystal Display (LCD) utilized in billions of consumer and professional devices."	
2013		Martin Cooper	"For their pioneering contributions to the world's first cellular telephone networks."	
2013	Joel S. Engel		"For their pioneering contributions to the world's first cellular telephone networks."	
2013		Richard H. Frenkiel	"For their pioneering contributions to the world's first cellular telephone networks."	
2013		Thomas Haug	"For their pioneering contributions to the world's first cellular telephone networks."	
2013		Yoshihisa Okumura	"For their pioneering contributions to the world's first cellular telephone networks."	
2014		John B. Goodenough	"For engineering the rechargeable lithium-ion battery that enables compact, lightweight mobile devices."	
2014	Yoshio Nishi		"For engineering the rechargeable lithium-ion battery that enables compact, lightweight mobile devices."	
2014		Rachid Yazami	"For engineering the rechargeable lithium-ion battery that enables compact, lightweight mobile devices."	
2014		Akira Yoshino	"For engineering the rechargeable lithium-ion battery that enables compact, lightweight mobile devices."	
2015		Isamu Akasaki	"For the invention, development, and commercialization of materials and processes for light-emitting diodes (LEDs)."	
2015	M. George Craford		"For the invention, development, and commercialization of materials and processes for light-emitting diodes (LEDs)."	
2015		Russell Dupuis	"For the invention, development, and commercialization of materials and processes for light-emitting diodes (LEDs)."	
2015		Nick Holonyak	"For the invention, development, and commercialization of materials and processes for light-emitting diodes (LEDs)."	
2015		Shuji Nakamura	"For the invention, development, and commercialization of materials and processes for light-emitting diodes (LEDs)."	
2016		Andrew J. Viterbi	"For development of the Viterbi algorithm, its transformational impact on digital wireless communications, and its significant applications in speech recognition and synthesis and in bioinformatics."	
2018		Bjarne Stroustrup	"For conceptualizing and developing the C++ programming language."	
2020	Jean Fréchet		"For the invention, development, and commercialization of chemically amplified materials for micro- and nanofabrication, enabling the extreme miniaturization of microelectronic devices."	
2020	C. Grant Willson		"For the invention, development, and commercialization of chemically amplified materials for micro- and nanofabrication, enabling the extreme miniaturization of microelectronic devices."	
2022		David A. Patterson	"For contributions to the invention, development, and implementation of reduced instruction set computer (RISC) chips."	
2022		John L. Hennessy	"For contributions to the invention, development, and implementation of reduced instruction set computer (RISC) chips."	
2022		Stephen B. Furber	"For contributions to the invention, development, and implementation of reduced instruction set computer (RISC) chips."	
2022		Sophie M. Wilson	"For contributions to the invention, development, and implementation of reduced instruction set computer (RISC) chips."	
2024		Stuart S.P. Parkin	"For engineering spintronic technologies, enabling digital information storage that serves as a foundation for our data-driven world."	
2026	Eric R. Fossum		"For innovation, development, and commercialization of the complementary metal-oxide semiconductor (CMOS) active pixel image sensor 'camera-on-a-chip'."	

== See also ==
- List of engineering awards
