= Douglas H. Ring =

American inventor

Douglas H. Ring (March 28, 1907 in Montana – September 8, 2000 in Red Bank, New Jersey) was one of the Bell Labs engineers that invented the cell phone. The history of cellular phone technology began on December 11, 1947 with an internal memo written by Douglas H. Ring in which he proposed development of a cellular telephone system by AT&T.

Although Martin Cooper of Motorola is considered the inventor of the first handheld cellular telephone and the first person to demonstrate to reporters a handheld cell phone call, Cooper's April 1973 call used cellular telephone technology invented and developed by Bell Labs engineers.

== See also ==
- History of mobile phones
- W. Rae Young
- Amos E. Joel, Jr.

== Patents of Douglas H. Ring ==
- U.S. patent 2,025,400 – Volume Control Circuits, filed May 26, 1934
- U.S. patent 2,165,509 – Oscillation Generator, filed April 22, 1938
- U.S. patent 2,225,928 – Multiple Unit Steerable Antenna System, filed July 14, 1939
- U.S. patent 2,406,402 – Frequency Adjustment of Resonant Cavities, filed September 3, 1941
- U.S. patent 2,410,838 – Microwave Coupling System, filed March 26, 1942
- U.S. patent 2,425,345 – Microwave Transmission System, filed December 23, 1942
- U.S. patent 2,633,492 – Guided Wave Frequency Range, filed December 30, 1948
- U.S. patent 2,629,782 – Reduction of Phase Distortion, filed August 20, 1949
- U.S. patent 2,639,326 – Microwave Frequency Structure Using Hybrid Junctions, filed March 6, 1951
- U.S. patent 2,629,772 – Reduction of Phase Distortion, filed September 21, 1951
- U.S. patent 2,775,700 – Frequency Stabilized Oscillator, filed October 1, 1953
- U.S. patent 3,032,723 – High Speed Microwave Switching Networks, filed May 31, 1960
