= Richard H. Frenkiel =

American engineer (born 1943)

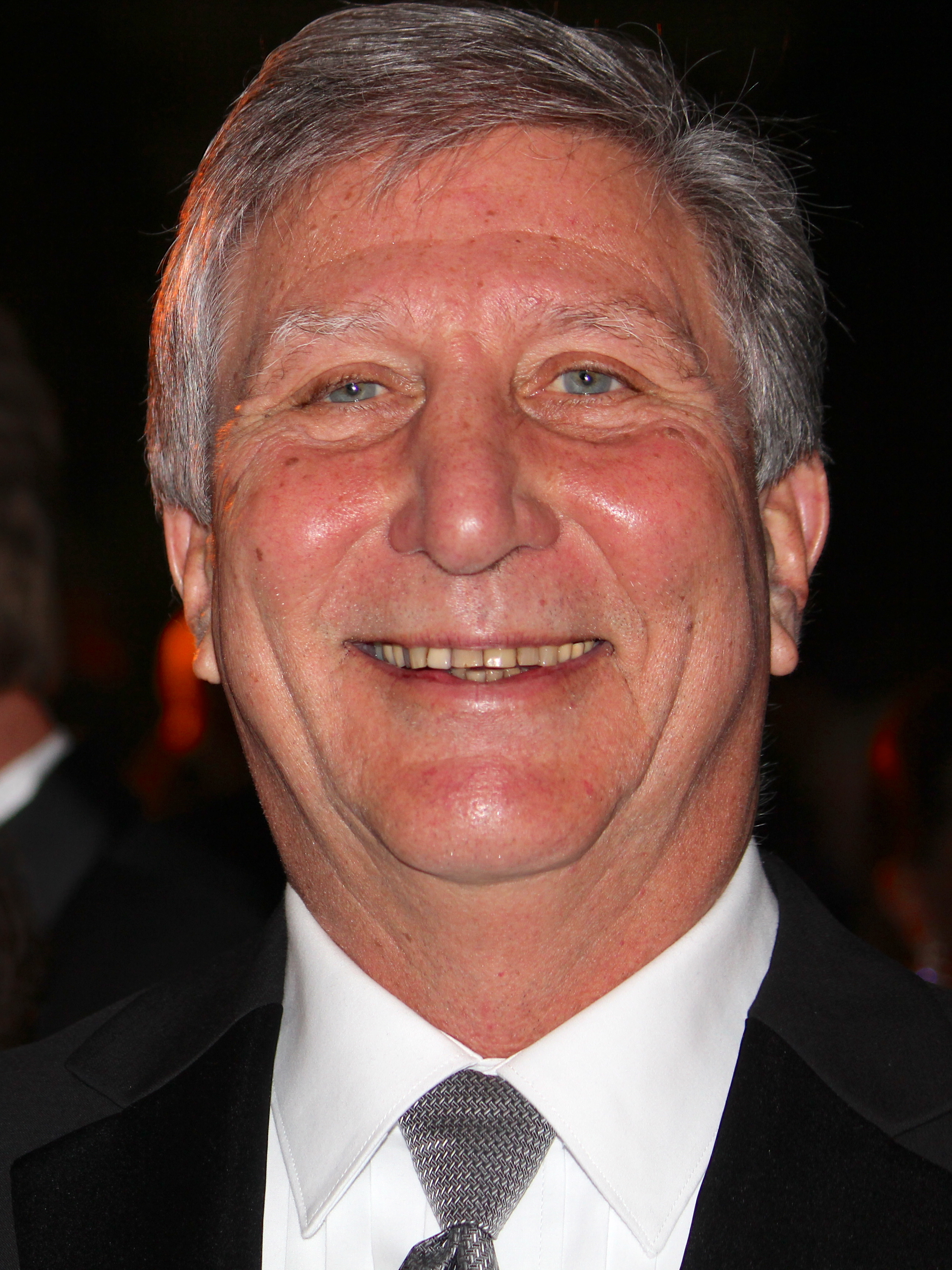
- Richard H. Frenkiel at the National Academy of Engineering presentation of the 2013 Charles Stark Draper Prize.
- Born: March 4, 1943 (age 83); Brooklyn, New York, United States
- Education: B.S. Tufts University; M.S. Rutgers University, 1965
- Engineering career
- Discipline: Mechanical engineering
- Institutions: Rutgers University
- Employer: AT&T Bell Labs
- Projects: Cellular networks
- Awards: IEEE Alexander Graham Bell Medal, 1987; IRI Achievement Award, 1993; National Medal of Technology, 1994; Charles Stark Draper Prize, 2013

Richard H. Frenkiel (born March 4, 1943 in Brooklyn, New York) is an American engineer, known for his significant role in the early development of cellular telephone networks.

== Professional career ==
Frenkiel earned a bachelor's degree in mechanical engineering at Tufts University and a master's degree at Rutgers University in 1965. Beginning in 1963, he worked for Bell Labs where he first designed recorded announcement machines. In late 1965, he was invited to get involved in the early planning of cellular telephone systems and was paired with Philip T. Porter, a cellular pioneer. They focused on cell geometry, vehicle locating and handoff, and overall system architecture, leading to an early system proposal. With Porter and Joel S. Engel, he was an author of the "High Capacity Mobile Telephone System Feasibility Studies and System Plan" which was filed with the FCC in 1971 and became an important cellular text.

From 1971 to 1973, Frenkiel worked at AT&T Corporate Headquarters, where he became a primary interface with the FCC on Cellular issues. In 1973, he returned to Bell Labs, where he managed a group of mobile phone system engineers. Their focus was on vehicle-locating techniques, maximizing channel efficiency, and methods of splitting cells to include additional towers for high volume areas. His "underlaid cell" concept greatly reduced the cost and logistic complexity of cell splitting and became AT&T's most sought-after patent in cross-licensing agreements.

For five years Frenkiel was head of the Mobile Systems Engineering Dept. at Bell Labs during the transition from experimental systems to commercial service. His department developed interface specifications for nationwide compatibility among cellular companies. He also served on the Electronic Industries Alliance Committee which proposed rules for cellular systems that were adopted by the FCC. After the FCC allocated new frequencies in 1968 for mobile phones, Frenkiel's engineering team developed specifications for cellular networks and its parametrization (1971). This was the basis for AMPS.

Frenkiel transferred to the AT&T Information Systems Labs in 1983, where he became head of cordless telephone development. He led the development of the 5000 series of cordless telephones, which achieved a much higher level of quality and performance than previous cordless telephones. He was also responsible for the early manufacture of those products in Singapore, pioneering the outsourcing of manufacturing within AT&T.

In 1994, Frenkiel was a co-recipient, along with Joel S. Engel, of the National Medal of Technology for their contributions to the creation of cellular systems. He has also received the Alexander Graham Bell Medal (1987) and the Achievement Award of the Industrial Research Institute (1992). He has been elected to the National Academy of Engineering and is a Fellow of the IEEE.

In 1994 Frenkiel returned to Rutgers University where he became a Visiting Professor of Electrical and Computer Engineering, and Director for Strategic Planning at WINLAB at Rutgers. He also works as an industry consultant and writer, and was Mayor of Manalapan, New Jersey in 1999. He currently teaches a course in Wireless Business Strategy at Rutgers University

== Publications ==
- U.S. patent 4,144,411 -- Cellular radiotelephone system structured for flexible use of different cell sizes, filed September 22, 1976, issued March 13, 1979

== See also ==
- History of mobile phones

== Awards ==
- IEEE Fellow (life fellow)
- IEEE Alexander Graham Bell Medal 1987 With Joel S. Engel and William C. Jakes, Jr.
- National Medal of Technology 1994 received from President Bill Clinton
- Charles Stark Draper Prize 2013 With Joel S. Engel, Martin Cooper, Thomas Haug and Yoshihisa Okumura
- Inductee into the Wireless Hall of Fame (2016).

Awards
Preceded by Bernard Widrow	IEEE Alexander Graham Bell Medal; 1987	Succeeded by Robert M. Metcalfe
