= Postpaid mobile phone =

Mobile phone service billing model

The postpaid mobile phone is a mobile phone for which service is provided by a prior arrangement with a mobile network operator or mobile virtual network operator. In this type of payment plan, the customer is billed at the end of each month according to their use of mobile services during that month. The alternative billing method is a prepaid mobile phone, where a user pays in advance for credit that is then consumed by use of the mobile phone service.

== Billing plans ==
Typically, the customer's contract with a specifies a limit or "allowance" of minutes, text messages etc., and the customer will be billed at a flat rate for any usage equal to or less than that allowance. Any usage above that limit incurs overage charges.

Postpaid service for mobile phones requires two components in order to make the "post-usage" model viable:

1. Credit history and contractual commitment. This is the basis on which the service provider is able to trust the customer with paying their bill when it is due and to have legal recourse in case of non-payment.
2. Service tenure. Most postpaid providers require customers to sign long term (1–3 year) contracts committing to use of the service. Failure to complete the term would make the customer liable for early termination fees.

== Usage ==
=== Europe ===
A 2010 survey of university students in 10 European countries found that 42% used postpaid plans and 13% had both postpaid and prepaid service.

=== United States and Canada ===
The United States and Canada are examples of countries dominated by postpaid providers, including AT&T, T-Mobile, and Verizon in the US and Bell, Rogers, and Telus in Canada, among others. In the US a smaller market has been captured by prepaid providers such as Boost Mobile, Metro by T-Mobile, Cricket Wireless, TracFone, and Ting, which use postpaid providers networks (e.g. Cricket runs on AT&T's network).

=== South Africa ===
In South Africa, about 20% of mobile phone users use postpaid contracts for voice and data service.
