= Mobile phone operator =

Type of telecom company

A mobile phone operator, wireless provider, or carrier is a mobile telecommunications company that provides wireless Internet GSM services for mobile device users. The operator gives a SIM card to the customer who inserts it into the mobile device to gain access to the service.

There are two types of mobile operators:

- A mobile network operator (MNO) which owns the underlying network and spectrum assets required to run the service.
- A mobile virtual network operator (MVNO) which buys wholesale service from an MNO and sells on to its own customers.

As of May 2016 (and for years before), the world's largest individual mobile operator by subscribers is China Mobile with over 835 million mobile subscribers. Over 50 mobile operators have over 10 million subscribers each, and over 150 mobile operators had at least one million subscribers by the end of 2009. In February 2010, there were 4.6 billion mobile subscribers, a number that is estimated to grow. Total mobile‐cellular subscriptions reached almost 6 billion by end 2011, corresponding to a global penetration of 86% .

== History ==
Prior to 1973, cellular mobile device technology was limited to devices installed in cars and other vehicles. The first fully automated telephone calling system for vehicles was launched in Sweden in 1960, called MTA (mobile telephone system A). Calls from the car were direct dial, whereas incoming calls required an operator to determine which base station the device was currently at. In 1962, an upgraded version called Mobile System B (MTB) was introduced. In 1971, the MTD version was launched, opening for several different brands of equipment and gaining commercial success. The network remained open until 1983 and still had 600 customers when it closed.

In 1958, development began on a similar service in the USSR, the Altay system for motorists. In 1963, the service started in Moscow, and by 1970, was deployed in 30 cities across the USSR. Versions of the Altay system are still in use today as a trunking system in some parts of Russia.

In 1959 a private telephone company located in Brewster, Kansas, US, the S&T Telephone Company, (still in business today) with the use of Motorola radio telephone equipment and a private tower facility, offered to the public cellular telephone services in that local area of NW Kansas.

In 1966, Bulgaria presented the pocket mobile automatic telephone RAT-0,5 combined with a base station RATZ-10 (RATC-10) on Interorgtechnika-66 international exhibition. One base station, connected to one telephone wire line, could serve up to six customers.

One of the first successful public commercial mobile phone networks was the ARP network in Finland, launched in 1971.

On April 3, 1973, Martin Cooper, a Motorola researcher and executive, made the first analog mobile phone call using a heavy prototype model. He called Dr. Joel S. Engel of Bell Labs.

The first commercially automated cellular network (the 1G generation) was launched in Japan by NTT in 1979. The initial launch network covered the full metropolitan area of Tokyo's over 20 million inhabitants with a cellular network of 23 base stations. Within five years, the NTT network had been expanded to cover the whole population of Japan and became the first nationwide 1G network. Several other countries also launched 1G networks in the early 1980s including the UK, Mexico and Canada.

In the 1990s, the 'second generation' (2G) mobile phone systems emerged, primarily using the GSM standard. In 1991, the first GSM network (Radiolinja) launched in Finland.

American and Canadian wireless providers tend to subsidize phones for consumers but tend to require 2 or 3-year contracts, while Asian and European providers sell the phone at full cost while the monthly fees charged are lower.

== See also ==
- Mobile telephony
- List of mobile network operators
- Telephone company
- List of telephone operating companies
- Cellphone overage charges
