= OLT (mobile network) =

Former manual mobile telephone network in Norway

OLT (Norwegian for Offentlig Landmobil Telefoni, Public Land Mobile Telephony), was the first land mobile telephone network in Norway. It was established December 1, 1966, and continued until it was obsoleted by NMT in 1990. In 1981, there were 30,000 mobile subscribers, which at the time made this network the largest in the world.

The network operated in the 160 MHz VHF band, using frequency modulation (FM) on 160-162 MHz for the mobile unit, and 168-170 MHz for the base station. Most mobile sets were semi-duplex, but some of the more expensive units were full duplex. Each subscriber was assigned a five digit phone number.

In 1976, the OLT system was extended to include UHF bands, incorporating MTD, and allowing international roaming within Scandinavian countries.
