= Leonid Kupriyanovich =

Soviet engineer (1929–1996)

Leonid Ivanovich Kupriyanovich (Russian: Леонид Иванович Куприянович, 14 July 1929 – 1 January 1996) was a Soviet engineer from Moscow who is credited for early development of a mobile phone device.

== Career ==
In 1953, Kupriyanovich graduated from Bauman Moscow State Technical University.

In 1955, Leonid Kupriyanovich published the description of a simple walkie-talkie amateur radio station for personal use in the Soviet amateur radio magazine "Radio," 1955, N2. It operated on two vacuum tubes. The walkie-talkie weighed about 1.2 kg and had 1.5 km operating distance.

In 1957 Leonid Kupriyanovich presented a micro walkie-talkie radio version the size of a matchbox, 50g in weight and had 2 km operating distance.

Also in 1957 he made an experimental model of a wearable automatic radio landline extender ("radiophone"), called LK-1 (not to be confused with the cancelled Soviet spacecraft of the same name or LK-1 (ЛК-1) the first Soviet trolleybus). His device consisted of a stationary module and a portable handset. LK-1 was reportedly 3 kg in weight, 20–30 km operating distance, and 20–30 hours of battery life. Leonid Kupriyanovich patented this landline extender in 1957 (author's certificate № 115494, 1.11.1957). The stationary module, following the author's description, could serve several customers. In 1958, Kupriyanovich purportedly made the new experimental "pocket" model radio phone. This phone supposedly had 0.5 kg weight. Kupriyanovich proposed the device to serve more customers and named it a correllator.

In 1961, Leonid Kupriyanovich presented a pocket automatic radio phone that could fit in the palm of a hand. This pocket mobile phone weighed only 70 g and had an 80 km operating distance. Kupriyanovich told correspondents of the АПН news agency that in the USSR, the production of this device was planned. He also reported the plans for the construction of ten base stations in Moscow to create a mobile communication network. The first station in Moscow was supposedly planned to be constructed in Mazilovo.

In the 1960s Leonid Kupriyanovich's electronic set "Rhytmoson" was manufactured in the USSR and purchased for medical purposes.

== See also ==
- List of Russian inventors
