= Page Communications Engineers =

Page Communications Engineers, Inc. was a 20th-century communications engineering firm that later became a subsidiary of a variety of communications and defense contractors. It is notable for, among other things, constructing the Vietnam portion of the U.S. military's Integrated Wideband Communications System in Vietnam and Thailand during the Vietnam War.

In 1959, Northrop purchased Page.

On 25 November 1966 eight Page employees and one United States Army 1st Signal Brigade soldier were killed in a Vietcong ambush as their convoy was en route to the Pr Line signal site (11.868°N 108.547°E) near Da Lat.

In 1981–82, the Continental Telephone Company, or Contel, acquired Page Communications Engineers, Inc. from the Northrop Corporation to form ConTel Page.
