= Prepaid mobile phone =

"Pay-as-you-go" mobile phone service

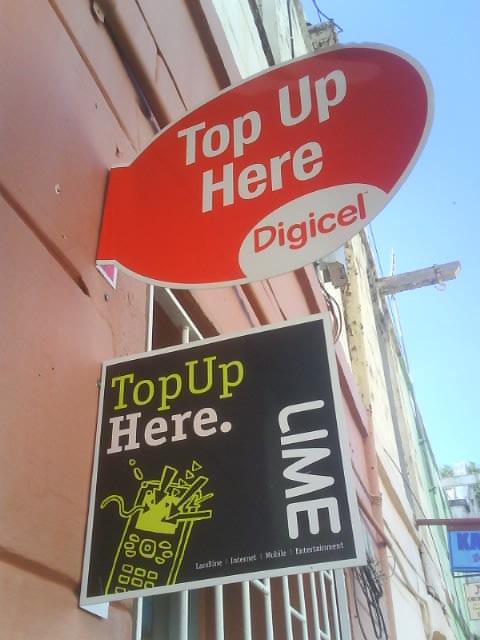
Typical sign showing where top-ups can be made

A prepaid mobile device, also known as a pay-as-you-go (PAYG), pay-as-you-talk, pay and go, go-phone, or prepay, is a mobile device such as a phone for which credit is purchased in advance of service use. The purchased credit is used to pay for telecommunications services at the point the service is accessed or consumed. If there is no credit, then access is denied by the cellular network or Intelligent Network. Users can top up their credit at any time using a variety of payment mechanisms such as the pay-as-you-go (PAYG). In 2020, 155 countries had the mandatory SIM registration laws for the prepaid mobile SIM cards such as the mandatory know your customer (KYC) or other type of legal identification verification at the point of sale to prevent the anonymous use of unregistered prepaid mobile which facilitates criminal or terrorist activities. Senior China official Deng Zhonghua says Hong Kong’s real-name SIM card registration will safeguard national security. A burner phone is a prepaid phone number specifically purchased without the know your customer (KYC) or other type of legal identification verification at the point of sale with the purpose of using it briefly and then replacing it, thus making this phone more suitable for criminal use.

The alternative billing method (and what is commonly referred to as a mobile contract) is the postpaid mobile phone, where a user enters into a long-term contract (lasting 12, 18, or 24 months) or short-term contract (also commonly referred to as a rolling contract or a 30-day contract) and billing arrangement with a mobile phone operator (mobile virtual network operator or mobile network operator).

== Overview ==
A prepaid mobile phone provides most of the services offered by a mobile phone operator. The main difference is that with prepaid phones, payment for service is made before use. As calls and texts are made, and as data is used, deductions are made against the prepaid balance amount until no funds remain (at which time services stop functioning). A user may avoid interruptions in service by making payments to increase the remaining balance.

Methods of payment:

- Credit card, debit card, or online payment processors.
- Direct draw from bank account using an ATM
- Retail store purchase with a "top-up" or "refill" card at retail. These cards are stamped with a unique code (often under a scratch-off panel) which must be entered into the phone in order to add the credit onto the balance.
- Retail store purchase using a swipe card where the balance is credited automatically to the phone after the retailer accepts payment.
- Retail store or online purchase: a person can top-up a prepaid phone in another country by asking for "international top-up". Often, migrant workers will send prepaid top-up internationally as a form of support.
- Other mobile phones on certain networks which provide international top-up services, where the initiator of the top up is often a migrant worker wanting to add minutes to the prepaid mobile phone of a family member back home.
- Direct from some open-loop prepaid cards featuring a mobile refill service.
- Through electronic reloading where a specially designed SIM card is used to reload a mobile phone by entering the mobile number and choosing the amount to be loaded. This process is widely implemented in the Philippines and India so that any person can be a prepaid load retailer, creating a nationwide availability of reloading stations, even in remote areas.

Credit purchased for a prepaid mobile phone may have a time limit – for example, 120 days from the date the last credit was added. In these cases, customers who do not add more credit before expiration will have their remaining balance depleted through expiration of the credits.

There is no compulsion on a prepaid mobile phone user to top up their balance. To maintain revenues, some operators have devised reward schemes designed to encourage frequent top-ups. For example, an operator may offer some free SMS to use next month if a user tops up by a certain amount this month.

Unlike postpaid phones, where subscribers have to terminate their contracts, it is not easy for an operator to know when a prepaid subscriber has left the network. To free up resources on the network for new customers, an operator will periodically delete prepaid SIM cards which have not been used for some time, at which point, their service (and its associated phone number) is discontinued. The rules for when this deletion happens vary from operator to operator, but may typically occur after six months to a year of non-use.

By 2003, the number of prepaid accounts grew past contract accounts, and by 2007, two-thirds of all mobile phone accounts worldwide were prepaid accounts.

== History ==
The history of prepaid mobile phones begins in the 1990s, when larger markets were being sought after by the mobile phone operators. Before this date, all mobile phone services were offered on a post-paid basis, which excluded people with poor credit.

Prepaid mobile service was invented by Subscriber Computing, Inc., an Orange County company, (1986–1998), founded and directed by Arlene Harris. The patents covering this invention are:

- US-5291543-A, filed 12/5/1990 and awarded on 9/15/1992.
- US-5148472-A, filed 6/24/1992 and awarded in 3/1/1994.

These patents describe the ability to access the cost of a call and deduct the cost of the call from the user's account balance in near real time. If the user's balance is below the carrier-defined threshold, the next call that the user makes is routed to an interactive voice response (IVR) device that announces to the user that the account balance is low and suggests they add funds to the account so their service is not interrupted. When the user's account balance is depleted, the service is suspended until they added funds to their account. If the user's account balance is depleted, all call attempts are routed to the IVR. These patents expired in 2010 and 2012 respectively.

The prepaid service was sold to Metro Mobile in June 1989, and was implemented in November 1989.

The prepaid service was also sold to carriers in Mexico; Celcom in 1994, and implementation took place in Monterrey, and to Telcel, where implementation began in November 1997 and production took place beginning in April 1998.

Ericsson also became a partner in the prepaid service; a memorandum of understanding (MOU) was signed in June 1997 and the final agreement was signed in late 1997. The announcement was made on January 26, 1998 (or listen to it).

Prepaid service enabled carriers in third world countries to add subscribers without having to print monthly statements or having an accounts receivable department, and gave them the ability to add subscribers without concern for their ability to pay their bills.

In 1996 MTN became the first mobile operator to introduce a prepaid cellular service in Africa, popularizing "pay as you go" in emerging markets.

The first prepaid card was called "Mimo" and was launched by TMN, the mobile phone operator of Portugal Telecom, in September 1995. In 2006 Swisscom celebrated ten years with its product and service "NATEL® easy" which also holds a patent on "prepaid mobile subscriber identification card and method implemented thereby".

== Versus postpaid ==
=== Advantages ===
A prepaid plan may have a lower cost (often for low usage patterns e.g. a telephone for emergency use) and make it easier to control spending by limiting debt and controlling usage. They often have fewer contractual obligations – no early termination fee, freedom to change providers, plans, able to be used by those unable to take out a contract (i.e. under age of majority). Depending on local laws, they may be available to those who do not have a permanent address, phone number, or credit card. This makes them popular among travelers and students away from their hometowns. Additionally, they are popular with parents who wish to have a way to stay connected with their college age students and have some control over the costs.

=== Disadvantages ===
Sometimes, pay-as-you-go customers pay more for their calls, SMS and data than contract customers. In some cases they are limited in what they can do with their phone – calls to international or premium-rate telephone numbers may be blocked, and they may not be able to roam. These limitations are usually the results of deficiencies in the prepaid systems used by the wireless carriers, as technology has evolved to the point where these are easily managed by triggers or APIs to third-party solution providers. Current models being deployed by wireless carriers are capable of setting the price points for all services on an individual basis (via packages), such that higher pricing is a marketing decision.

== Churn ==
As described above, prepaid accounts require a subscriber to have a credit balance in the account to make outgoing calls (except emergency calls, which are always allowed). In the US, incoming calls are also barred, while in some other countries, a prepaid mobile with zero balance may still receive calls and texts.

This results in an "on/off" or "all or nothing" proposition for the prepaid service providers and their clients (i.e. the account either has enough credit to use the phone, or it does not). Some operators (e.g., Orange) allow their pre-paid customers to have a small negative balance to allow short calls or texts when the customer's credit has been completely used. This is then deducted when the customer next adds more credit.

The time most likely for a prepaid customer to switch to a different service provider is when the prepaid account reaches a "zero credit balance". Like other service providers, mobile service providers losing a mobile account call it "churn".

== Roaming ==
In the early years, a prepaid mobile phone could only be used within the network of the operator from which the customer purchased the phone. It was not possible to roam onto other GSM networks when using the phone abroad. This was because the operator had no way to bill calls in real time from another network.

However, most prepaid phones now offer roaming using one of the following methods:

- The prepaid mobile phone user dials a "trigger" number from the foreign location using a USSD message which is not charged for while roaming. Upon receipt of the USSD, the customer's operator will then return the call. When the service calls back, the user is being charged for the cost of the service from the credit available in the home network. The service will then prompt the user to enter the dialed number of the party to be called. The disadvantage of this method of roaming is that the user will not be able to dial numbers directly from the handset. The advantage is that it works in almost all locations around the world since USSD is ubiquitous and free.
- The user can direct dial from their handset if the network they are roaming in supports CAMEL (Customized Applications for Mobile networks Enhanced Logic). This allows real time billing by the home operator without having to dial the customer back. The advantage is that it is more natural and works seamlessly. The disadvantage is that not all networks support CAMEL so the list of countries where a prepaid customer can use their phone abroad is smaller than for postpaid mobile phones.

== Privacy rights ==
Burner phone is a prepaid phone number specifically purchased without know your customer (KYC) or identity registration with the purpose of using it briefly and then replacing it. Such a phone is colloquially known as a burner phone or simply burner. A Los Angeles technology company has developed a mobile application of the same name that replicates this functionality for any smartphone. In 2010, United States Senators Chuck Schumer (D-NY) and John Cornyn (R-TX) introduced legislation requiring consumers to produce identification before buying pre-paid phones, but it was not passed.

In January 2020, research found that governments of 155 countries have SIM registration laws such as a mandatory KYC or other type of legal identification verification at the point of sale; in some countries, prepaid users must submit biometrics like photos and fingerprints. Since July 2013, at least 80 countries globally (including 37 on the African continent) have mandated, or are actively considering mandating, the registration of prepaid SIM users.

There is a concern by police and security agencies that anonymous use of prepaid mobile services facilitates criminal or terrorist activities. Prepaid phone users can be anonymous for two reasons:

- In certain countries, there is no mandatory legal requirement to register the phone in the name of buyer at point of sale in shops by conducting KYC or other type of legal identification verification—unlike postpaid phones, whose seller has to credit check the user before allowing them to purchase and enter into a contract.
- As prepaid services can often be topped up using cash and vouchers, there is no way to trace the payment and thence determine the identity of a prepaid phone user from payment records.

While there is no doubt that criminals and terrorists use prepaid SIM cards to help stay anonymous and avoid easy detection, to date there has been no empirical evidence to indicate that mandating the registration of prepaid SIM users leads to a reduction in criminal activities or that the lack of any registration of prepaid SIM users is linked to a greater risk of criminal or terrorist activities. This may be due to the fact that the rate of crimes committed using burner phones is rising faster with the rising mobile phone adoption as compared to the ratio of crimes prevented by the mandatory phone registration.

In fact, a publicly available policy assessment report from Mexico showed that mandatory SIM registration introduced there in 2009 had failed to help the prevention, investigation and/or prosecution of associated crimes. As a result, policymakers decided to repeal the regulation three years later.

== International branding ==
In an effort to differentiate the prepaid from post-paid service for their customers, CSPs have branded prepaid services differently from the post-paid services. A variant of post-paid service has emerged in recent years that comes closer to the prepaid service, by offering a "pay monthly" contract.

Prepaid phones and SIMs in the United Kingdom are known as "pay as you go".

== Usage ==
Usage of prepaid cellphone service was common in most parts of the world. In 2012 around 70% of customers in Western Europe and China use prepaid phones with the figure rising to over 90% for customers in India and Africa. 36% of cellphone users in the United States of America were using some form of prepaid service as of 2021. Prepaid SIM cards are also becoming a variation of the traditional prepaid cellphone plans. Rather than needing to purchase an entirely new phone, existing phones can be used by simply replacing the SIM card within the device. Prepaid service has also evolved to include rate plans and buckets traditionally seen in postpaid plans but with a lower cost of ownership for the network operator. Such advance pay plans are often monthly plans with either unlimited voice/SMS/MMS (or monthly buckets for some of these) and prepaid data volume add-ons and throttling mechanisms.

== See also ==
- International mobile remittance
- Mobile broadband
