= MTD (mobile network) =

Former Swedish mobile telephony network

MTD (Swedish abbreviation for Mobiltelefonisystem D, or Mobile telephony system D) was a manual mobile phone system for the 450 MHz frequency band. It was introduced in 1971 in Sweden, and lasted until 1987, when it was made obsolete by the NMT automatic service. The MTD network had 20,000 users at its peak, with 700 people employed as phone operators.

MTD was also implemented in Denmark and in Norway (from 1976), which allowed roaming within the Scandinavian countries.

== MTA ==
In Sweden, the first mobile phone system was MTA (for Mobiltelefonisystem A), which was introduced in 1956, and lasted until 1967. It was a 160 MHz system available in Stockholm and Gothenburg, with 125 total subscribers. The second system, MTB (for Mobiltelefonisystem B), had transistorized mobile sets, was introduced in 1962, and lasted until 1983. It operated in the 76–77.5 and 81–82.5 MHz bands, was also available in Malmö, and had around 600 subscribers.

== OLT ==
In Norway, the first mobile phone system was OLT, introduced in 1966. In 1976, the OLT system was extended to include UHF bands, incorporating MTD, and allowing international roaming within Sweden.
