= Joel S. Engel =

American electrical engineer (born 1936)

- Born: Joel Stanley Engel; February 4, 1936 (age 89); New York City, U.S.
- Education: City College of New York (BSc); Massachusetts Institute of Technology School of Engineering (MSc); Polytechnic Institute of Brooklyn (PhD)
- Occupation: Electrical engineer
- Known for: Contributions to the development of cellular networks
- Awards: IEEE Alexander Graham Bell Medal (1987); National Medal of Technology (1994); Charles Stark Draper Prize (2013)

Joel Stanley Engel (born February 4, 1936) is an American electrical engineer who made fundamental contributions to the development of cellular networks.

Born in New York City, he obtained a B.Sc. in engineering at City College of New York (1957). While working at the Massachusetts Institute of Technology in the research staff at Draper Laboratory on inertial guidance and stabilization systems, he also obtained an M.Sc. in electrical engineering (1959). He then moved to New Jersey and worked for Bell Labs most of his active research career (1959–83), and also earned a Ph.D. from Polytechnic Institute of Brooklyn on a thesis on data transmission over telephone lines (1964).

He then worked at Bellcomm on guidance systems for the Apollo Program (1965) and at Page Communications Engineers in Washington, D.C. (1965–67) before returning to Bell Labs where he joined the mobile phone system research group. He also lectured at Polytechnic Institute of Brooklyn. After the Federal Communications Commission (FCC) opened up new frequencies (1968), his engineering team developed the architecture for cellular network and its parametrization (1971), which was the basis for Advanced Mobile Phone System, eventually commercialized (1983).

After a rotation at AT&T (1973–75), Engel returned to Bell Labs as a Department Head with responsibilities for a broad range of projects.

Engel later joined Satellite Business Systems (1983–86) as VP of engineering, and became VP of research and development at MCI Communications (1986–87), when MCI acquired SBS.

He was VP of technology and Chief Technology Officer at Ameritech (1987–97).

Engel was elected a member of the National Academy of Engineering in 1996 for contributions to the theory and design of cellular telecommunications systems.

== Awards ==
- IEEE Fellow 1980 (life fellow) for contribution to the concept and to the implementation of spectrally efficient, cellular mobile telephone systems.
- IEEE Alexander Graham Bell Medal 1987 With Richard H. Frenkiel and William C. Jakes Nurse, Jr.
- National Medal of Technology 1994 With Richard H. Frenkiel
- National Academy of Engineering 1996
- Charles Stark Draper Prize 2013
- Wireless Hall of Fame 2016

Awards
Preceded by Bernard Widrow	IEEE Alexander Graham Bell Medal; 1987	Succeeded by Robert M. Metcalfe
