= Internet in Germany =

The main form of Internet access in Germany is DSL, introduced by Deutsche Telekom in 1999. Other technologies such as cable, FTTH and FTTB (fiber), satellite, and mobile access via UMTS, HSDPA, and LTE are also in use.

== DSL ==
DSL is the dominant internet access technology in Germany, with more than 30 million subscribers. For residential services, the Annex B versions of ADSL, ADSL2+, and VDSL2 are most common. Deutsche Telekom, with over 12 million customers, is the market leader.

Other DSL providers either operate their own hardware on local loops rented from Deutsche Telekom through local loop unbundling (LLU), or purchase bit-stream access from wholesale providers. End users typically connect their modem through a standard TAE connector socket.

As of April 2024, typical monthly prices for combined internet and telephone service start at about €25 for ADSL2+ (16 Mbit/s down, 1 Mbit/s up) and €30 for VDSL2 (50 Mbit/s down, 10 Mbit/s up).

Major nationwide DSL providers include:

- Deutsche Telekom
  - Congstar
- 1&1
- Vodafone
- o2
- Versatel

Deutsche Telekom and Vodafone also offer DSL-based triple-play bundles with IPTV, which generally require at least 16 Mbit/s for HD quality.

Since 2013, all newly deployed Deutsche Telekom VDSL2 nodes have supported G.vector technology. In August 2014, vectored VDSL2 service with up to 100 Mbit/s downstream and 40 Mbit/s upstream became available. Existing deployments in major cities were upgraded to G.vector in 2016. Deutsche Telekom introduced a 500 Mbit/s service in September 2017, with an initial monthly price of €119.95.

Symmetric DSL (SDSL), based on G.shdsl technology, is marketed primarily to business customers. Providers offering SDSL include Deutsche Telekom, QSC, and Versatel.

== Cable ==
According to Statista, Vodafone, Germany's largest cable internet provider, had 7.65 million cable internet customers at the end of Q2 2020. Although this figure is significantly lower than the number of DSL customers, it has increased in recent years, likely due to higher maximum speeds and comparatively low prices.

Cable internet is offered by Kabel Deutschland and Unitymedia (operating in different regions), both of which are now owned by Vodafone. Other providers with more limited coverage include Tele Columbus’s subsidiary, PYUR. Since November 2014, Unitymedia and Kabel Deutschland have offered connections with downstream speeds of up to 200 Mbit/s. Unitymedia introduced 400 Mbit/s connections in January 2016, and Vodafone Kabel Deutschland followed in June 2016.

As of January 2021, both companies offer cable internet with downstream speeds of up to 1000 Mbit/s. Prices start at €49.99 per month from Vodafone and €88 per month from PYUR (excluding temporary discounts for new customers). Vodafone reports the widest nationwide availability for gigabit connections, reaching 22 million households as of 2021. Upload speeds of up to 50 Mbit/s are also offered. These services use DOCSIS 3.1 with backward compatibility for EuroDOCSIS 3.0. Vodafone has announced plans for DOCSIS 4.0 field tests, supporting up to 10 Gbit/s downstream and 6 Gbit/s upstream, once new hardware becomes available.

Cable internet is currently the most widely available form of gigabit access for residential customers, although fiber-optic connections can provide comparable or faster speeds in an expanding but still geographically limited number of regions.

== Alternative technologies ==
While DSL and cable are the predominant internet access technologies in Germany, other options may offer lower prices, wider availability, or higher speeds.

=== FTTH and FTTB ===
Deutsche Telekom began offering FTTH/FTTB in selected regions in 2011, with speeds of up to 200 Mbit/s downstream and 100 Mbit/s upstream. As of January 2014, Deutsche Telekom FTTH was available in about 884,000 households, priced at €55 for 100/50 Mbit/s and €60 for 200/100 Mbit/s service.

Regional providers also offer FTTH/FTTB, including M-Net in Munich, wilhelm.tel in Hamburg, NetCologne in Cologne, and NetAachen in Aachen. Since late 2018, additional providers, including Vodafone, Deutsche Telekom, Greenfiber, Deutsche Glasfaser, and 1&1, have expanded fiber availability. As of May 2021, fiber networks in some regions offered speeds of up to 10,000 Mbit/s.

=== Satellite ===
Satellite internet is more widely available than land-based technologies. In areas without DSL, cable, or FTTx coverage, satellite and UMTS/LTE are the primary options for broadband access. Unlike UMTS/LTE, satellite internet providers typically offer flat-rate plans.

=== UMTS/HSDPA and LTE ===
Deutsche Telekom and Vodafone provide fixed-location internet services on their UMTS and LTE networks. As of December 2014, no flat rates were available. Data allowances for fixed-location service were typically larger than for mobile service at comparable price levels. After exceeding monthly allowances of 10–30 GB, speeds were reduced to 384 kbit/s.

UMTS/HSDPA (up to 42.2 Mbit/s downstream) and LTE (up to 375 Mbit/s downstream) were offered by all four network operators: Deutsche Telekom, Vodafone, o2, and E-Plus. In 2013, Chip measured average downstream UMTS/GPRS rates between 2.4 and 7.9 Mbit/s, and LTE/UMTS/GPRS rates between 3.2 and 16.0 Mbit/s, depending on provider and region (rural vs. urban). In the same study, LTE coverage ranged from 15% to 80%, depending on provider and region.

As of 2025, typical mobile contracts with 10 GB of LTE/5G data, unlimited calls, and text messages start at around €5 per month.

== History ==
=== Early history ===
The first internet email from the United States to Germany was sent in 1984. Germany became the third country to join CSNET, after the United States initiated the network in 1981 and Israel joined earlier in 1984. (Note: Norway and the United Kingdom had been on the ARPANET since 1973 and had used TCP/IP since 1982.)

The postal service Deutsche Bundespost held a monopoly on telecommunications until 1989. That year, Deutsche Telekom was spun off as a separate company in preparation for privatization. As a government-owned corporation, Deutsche Telekom remained the monopoly internet service provider (ISP) until its privatization in 1995, and it continued to dominate the market thereafter. Until the early 2000s, Deutsche Telekom controlled almost all internet access for individuals and small businesses.

Bildschirmtext (BTX), introduced by Deutsche Bundespost in 1983, was an early videotex service. Under Deutsche Telekom it was marketed as an alternative to the internet, but it was discontinued in 2001.

=== DSL ===
Before the introduction of DSL and cable internet, voice-band modems and ISDN BRI were the most common residential access technologies. ISDN adoption was widespread, with 333 ISDN BRIs per 1,000 inhabitants in 2005.

DSL was introduced by Deutsche Telekom on 1 July 1999 under the brand name T-DSL, with speeds of 768 kbit/s downstream and 128 kbit/s upstream. Deutsche Telekom gradually increased speeds: 1536/192 kbit/s in 2002, 3072/384 kbit/s in 2004, and 6016/576 kbit/s in 2005. In 2006 it introduced ADSL2+ (16,000/1024 kbit/s) and VDSL2 (50,000/10,000 kbit/s) with triple-play services under the brand Entertain. VDSL2 service without IPTV followed in 2009.

In 2011, Deutsche Telekom introduced Voice over IP (VoIP) over ADSL2+ Annex J. In February 2013, it began migrating POTS and ISDN subscribers to VoIP. In August 2014, Deutsche Telekom introduced vectored VDSL2 using G.vector technology, with speeds of 100/40 Mbit/s.

In 1998, the Federal Network Agency (BNetzA) introduced regulations for local loop unbundling. This enabled providers such as Vodafone, O2, QSC, and Versatel to rent the local loop from Deutsche Telekom and operate their own access networks. Competing ISPs either offered services directly or resold bitstream access from other providers. To compete with POTS and ISDN, alternative ISPs bundled DSL with VoIP under the label Komplettanschluss.

Starting in 2004, Deutsche Telekom provided IP-level bitstream access under the name T-DSL resale. Initially, this required a Deutsche Telekom POTS or ISDN subscription. In July 2008, Deutsche Telekom introduced bitstream access that did not require POTS or ISDN, enabling competitors to offer bundled internet and VoIP service.

Because G.vector is incompatible with local loop unbundling, BNetzA created a “vectoring list.” This allowed providers to claim cabinets on a first-come, first-served basis, while requiring those providers to offer bit-stream access to competitors.

=== Cable ===
Cable internet access in Germany began with pilot projects in December 2003, followed by wider deployment in late 2004. Earlier adoption was delayed by political and regulatory factors. Until 2001, Deutsche Telekom owned the national coaxial cable network and avoided introducing cable internet to prevent competition with DSL. Regulatory pressure eventually forced Deutsche Telekom to sell the network, though the company attempted to delay the introduction of cable internet.

=== LTE ===
LTE internet access was introduced by Deutsche Telekom in 2010 and by Vodafone in 2011. As part of the 2010 spectrum auction, the Federal Network Agency required bidders to use newly acquired spectrum to provide broadband service in underserved areas. For this purpose, Deutsche Telekom and Vodafone introduced fixed-location LTE service.

== Internet censorship and surveillance ==
Internet censorship in Germany is practiced by law as well as the effect of some court decisions. An example of content censored by law is the removal of web sites from Google search results that deny the holocaust, which is a felony under German law.

Most cases of Internet censorship in Germany, however, occur after state court rulings. One example is a 2009 court order, forbidding German Wikipedia to disclose the identity of Wolfgang Werlé and Manfred Lauber, two criminals convicted of the murder of the Bavarian actor Walter Sedlmayr. In another case, Wikipedia.de (an Internet domain run by Wikimedia Deutschland) was prohibited from pointing to the actual Wikipedia content. The court order was as a temporary injunction in a case filed by politician Lutz Heilmann over claims in a German Wikipedia article regarding his past involvement with the former German Democratic Republic's intelligence service Stasi.

== See also ==
- Fireball (search engine)
- Internet censorship in Germany
- Pirate Party Germany
