= T-Mobile (brand) =

Brand of telecommunications service by Deutsche Telekom

- Product type: Telecommunications
- Current owner: Deutsche Telekom
- Introduced: 1989; 37 years ago 1996; 30 years ago
- Discontinued: Austria; Croatia; Germany; Hungary; Montenegro; North Macedonia; Netherlands; Slovakia; United Kingdom
- Markets: Czech Republic; Poland; United States

T-Mobile is the brand name used by some of the mobile communications subsidiaries of the German telecommunications company Deutsche Telekom AG in the Czech Republic (T-Mobile Czech Republic), Poland (T-Mobile Polska) and the United States (T-Mobile US).

The T-Mobile brand was introduced in 1996 and the name was previously used by subsidiaries in other countries, including Austria (now Magenta), Croatia (now Hrvatski Telekom), Germany (now Deutsche Telekom), Hungary (now Magyar Telekom), Montenegro (now Crnogorski Telekom), the Netherlands (now Odido), North Macedonia (now Makedonski Telekom), Slovakia (now Slovak Telekom), and the United Kingdom (now EE).

In 1999, Deutsche Telekom formed the holding company T-Mobile International AG for its mobile communications subsidiaries. From 2003 to 2007, T-Mobile International was one of Deutsche Telekom's services, in addition to "Broadband/Fixnet" (T-Mobile Fiber), "Business Customers" and "Group HQ and Shared Services". In 2009, Deutsche Telekom transformed its structure to adopt a regional setup (Germany, Europe, US). By combining its previously separated fixed and mobile subsidiaries to form integrated local businesses, T-Mobile International itself was merged into Deutsche Telekom AG.

When T-Mobile International AG existed, the holding company was based in Bonn, Germany, and its subsidiaries operated GSM-, UMTS- and LTE-based cellular networks in Europe, the United States, Puerto Rico and the U.S. Virgin Islands. The company had financial stakes in mobile operators in both Central and Eastern Europe. Globally, T-Mobile International's subsidiaries had a combined total of approximately 230 million subscribers. It was the world's thirteenth-largest mobile-phone service provider by subscribers, and the fourth-largest multinational after the UK's Vodafone, India's Airtel, and Spain's Telefónica.

== History ==
Previous logo

Logo of Deutsche Bundespost Telekom with posthorn before privatisation

Germany's first mobile-communications services were radiotelephone systems that were owned and operated by the state postal monopoly, Deutsche Bundespost. It launched the analog first-generation C-Netz ("C Network", marketed as C-Tel), Germany's first true mobile phone network in 1985.

On 1 July 1989, West Germany reorganized Deutsche Bundespost and consolidated telecommunications into a new unit, Deutsche Bundespost Telekom. On 1 July 1992, it began to operate Germany's first GSM network, along with the C-Netz, as its DeTeMobil subsidiary. The GSM 900 MHz frequency band was referred to as the "D-Netz", and Telekom named its service D1; the private consortium awarded the second license (now Vodafone Germany) chose the name D2. Deutsche Bundespost Telekom was renamed Deutsche Telekom AG on 1 January 1995 as part of phase two of the German communications reform. This process of deregulation continued in November 1996, when DT was privatized and had the largest European IPO at the time, with the stock abbreviation 'DT 1'.

In December 1999, T-Mobile International AG & Co. KG holding company was founded (later renamed T-Mobile International AG). In 2002, as DT consolidated its international operations, it anglicized the T-Mobil name to T-Mobile.

On 5 July 2005 Deutsche Telekom transformed its structure and adopted a regional setup (Germany, Europe, US). Where available, the local mobile businesses were combined with the respective local wireline businesses to follow the integrated business approach. In 2009 T-Mobile International AG was merged into Deutsche Telekom AG.

== Deutsche Telekom Mobile Operations ==
| Country | Operator | Number of customers (in millions) |
|---|---|---|
| Austria | Magenta Telekom | 5.066 |
| Bosnia and Herzegovina | HT Eronet (JP Hrvatske telekomunikacije d.d. Mostar) (39.10% shares held by Hrvatski Telekom) | 0.834 |
| Croatia | Hrvatski Telekom (53.5% ownership) | 2.273 |
| Czech Republic | T-Mobile Czech Republic | 6.206 |
| Germany | Telekom Deutschland GmbH | 50.272 |
| Greece | Telekom Greece 100.00% (shares held by OTE) | 6.935 |
| Hungary | Magyar Telekom Nyrt. (61.39% ownership) | 5.504 |
| Montenegro | Crnogorski Telekom A.D. (76.53% shares held by Hrvatski Telekom) | 0.3 |
| North Macedonia | Makedonski Telekom AD (59.21% shares held by Magyar Telekom) | 1.2 |
| Poland | T-Mobile Polska | 11.290 |
| Romania | Telekom Romania Mobile (99.99% shares held by OTE) | 3.539 |
| Slovakia | Slovak Telekom | 2.478 |
| United States | T-Mobile US (53.1% ownership) | 104.790/104.791 |

Map of countries where T-Mobile offers carrier services as of 2025: Operating as T-Mobile or Telekom As HT Eronet As Cosmote Former markets

=== Austria ===
Until 2000, Magenta Telekom (known then as T-Mobile(austria)) was a shareholder of the former max.mobil. network. In April 2001, it acquired one hundred percent and subsequently introduced the T-Mobile brand in Austria by rebranding max.mobil. in April 2002 as T-Mobile Austria. It later rebranded again to Magenta Telekom on 6 May 2019, after acquiring the Austrian operations of UPC from Liberty Global in December 2017.

In 2005, it acquired former competitor tele.ring from Western Wireless International. It is now used as a discount brand. tele.ring is an Austrian mobile network operator. Since it was bought by Magenta Telekom (then T-Mobile) in 2006, it is no longer a legally independent company. Tele.ring is administratively independent and now acts primarily as a discount-offer, similar to Yesss and BoB of A1. In the past, tele.ring was known for their aggressive price-politics.

=== Croatia ===
T-Mobile entered the Croatian market in October 1999 when DT initially acquired a thirty-five percent interest in Hrvatski telekom, including its cell phone service provider Cronet. Two years later, DT signed an agreement with the Croatian government to acquire the additional 16 percent needed for a majority holding. In January 2003, Hrvatski Telekom assembled all of its mobile activities under a single brand HTmobile. Finally, in October 2004, HTmobile became T-Mobile Hrvatska, or T-Mobile Croatia, thus joining the global T-Mobile family also by name. Since January 1, 2010, Hrvatski Telekom and T-Mobile Croatia merged into one company on the Croatian market under the name Hrvatski Telekom (in English: Croatian Telecom); the T-Mobile brand remained active in the mobile-business area and T-Com in the fixed-business area until 2013 when they were replaced by unified brand "Hrvatski Telekom".

=== Czech Republic ===
T-Mobile was previously known as Paegas in the Czech Republic. T-Mobile Czech Republic a.s. has been operating in the Czech market since 1996. As of 31 December 2014, 6 million customers were using T-Mobile services.

T-Mobile Czech Republic a.s. operates a public mobile communications network on the GSM standard in the 900 and 1800 MHz bands and is also authorized to operate a UMTS network. On 19 October 2005, T-Mobile was the first operator in the Czech Republic to launch this third-generation technology under the name Internet 4G.

=== Germany ===
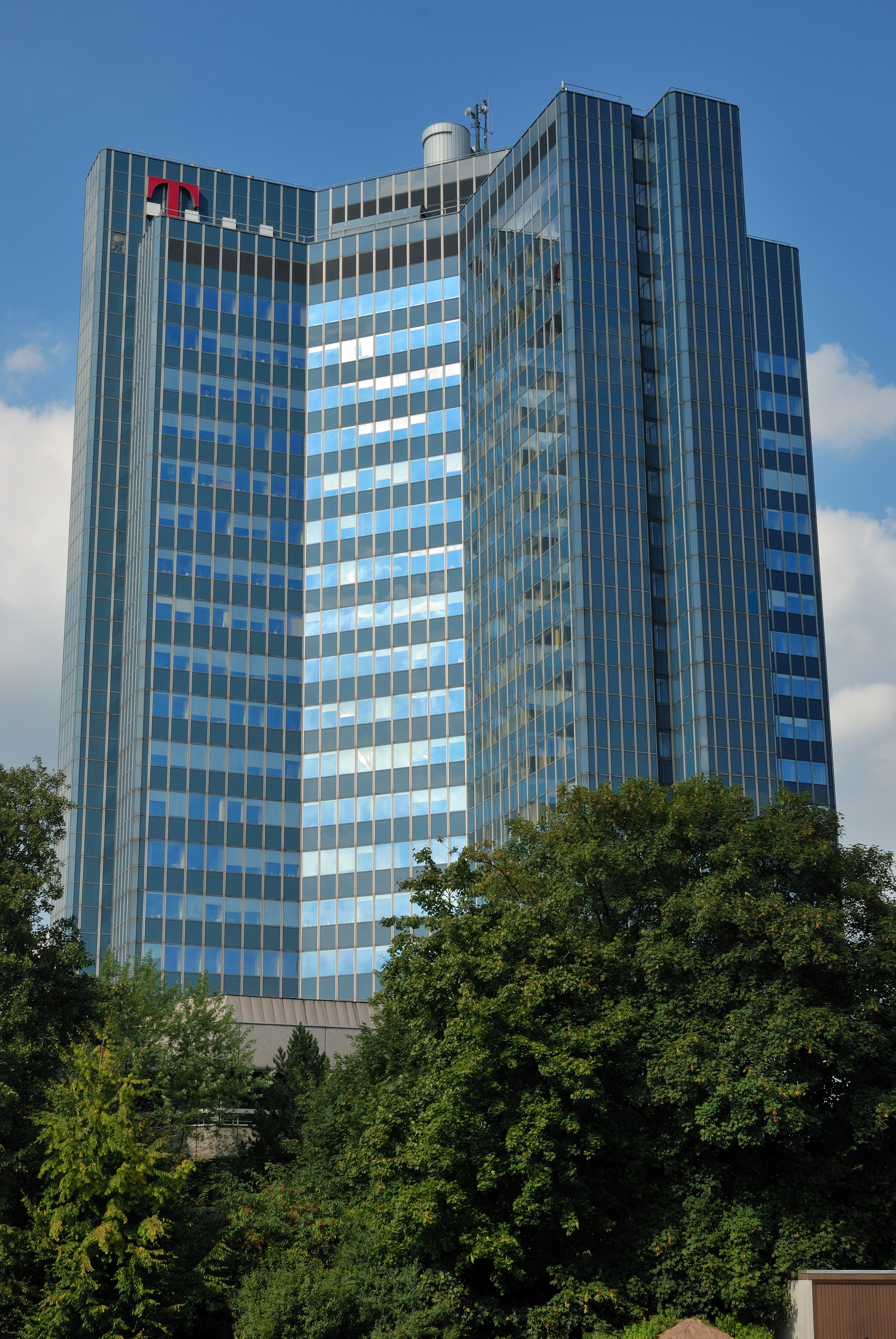
Telekom Tower Dortmund in Dortmund, Germany

Germany's initial mobile communications services were radiotelephone systems that were owned and operated by the state postal monopoly, Deutsche Bundespost. These early mobile communications networks were referred to as the "A" and "B" networks.

Deutsche Bundespost Telekom built Germany's first cellular mobile network, an analog, first-generation system referred to as the "C" network or C-Netz. The network became operational in 1985 and services were marketed under the C-Tel brand. Following German reunification in 1990, the "C" network was extended to the former East Germany.

On 1 July 1992, Deutsche Bundespost Telekom's DeTeMobil subsidiary began operating Germany's first GSM 900 MHz frequency cellular network, which the organization referred to as D-Netz. Digital GSM services were marketed under the "D1" brand and DeTeMobil continued to sell analog cellular services concurrently under the existing C-Tel brand. In 1994, DeTeMobil introduced short message service (SMS) services.

In 1996, DT began to brand its subsidiaries with the T- prefix, renaming the DeTeMobil subsidiary T-Mobil and rebranding the GSM cellular network T-D1. C-Netz was renamed to T-C-Tel. The T-C-Tel / C-Netz services were fully discontinued in 2000.

D1 introduced prepaid service called Xtra in 1997.

Despite the numerous changes in subsidiary names and brands, Germans sometimes continue to use the T-D1 name within Germany and refer to T-Mobile as D1. On 1 April 2010, after the T-Home and T-Mobile German operations merged to form Telekom Deutschland GmbH, a wholly owned DT subsidiary; the T-Mobile brand was discontinued in Germany and replaced with the Telekom brand.

=== Hungary ===
On 1 May 2004, the same day as Hungary joined the European Union, the former company, named Westel (which was owned entirely by the former Matáv) changed its name, and the entire marketing. Westel was the most popular cellphone network in Hungary at the time. The company was called T-Mobile Hungary, but after some financial decisions, as with the other T- companies, it formed to Magyar Telekom Nyrt. Mobil Szolgáltatások Üzletág (Hungarian Telekom, Mobile Services Business Unit), and its branding started to use Telekom instead of T-Mobile. T-Mobile also provides high-speed services, like EDGE, 3G, and HSDPA in Hungary's major cities.

=== North Macedonia ===
In Republic of North Macedonia, T-Mobile was previously known as Mobimak. The company has been operating in the Macedonian market since 1996. On 7 September 2006, Mobimak accepted the international T-Mobile branding. By June 2007, T-Mobile reached one million subscribers, out of which 85 percent were active and using their services. T-Mobile MK covers 98 percent of the population. It has a GSM 900 licence, offers GPRS, MMS and mobile internet services using T-Mobile HotSpots and has implemented the EDGE fast mobile internet specification. T-Mobile Macedonia applied for a UMTS licence on 1 August 2007. From 1 July T-Mobile ceased to exist as a legal entity and was replaced by the Telekom brand. The carrier name is now Telekom MK. The codes are 070/071/072.

=== Montenegro ===
The T-Mobile brand entered the Montenegrin market in 2006 through the acquisition of MoNet GSM mobile provider. T-Mobile Montenegro (T-Mobile Crna Gora) is fully owned by T-Crnogorski Telekom, which is itself owned by Magyar Telekom, a DT subsidiary. Although the acquisition by Magyar Telekom was done in 2005, it was not until 26 September 2006, that the MoNet GSM operator was re-branded as T-Mobile Montenegro.

MoNet GSM launched on July 1, 2000, as part of Telecom Montenegro. It became an independent incorporated limited-liability company a month later, on 1 August 2000. The company currently holds around 34 percent of the Montenegrin market and uses GSM 900, GPRS, and EDGE technologies. Since 21 June 2007, 3G/UMTS services have been available in larger cities as well as on the coast.

=== Netherlands ===
Deutsche Telekom entered the Dutch market by the acquisition of Ben on 20 September 2002. In 2007, T-Mobile Netherlands, a wholly owned subsidiary of T-Mobile International, acquired Orange Netherlands from France Télécom for EUR 1.33 billion. This makes it the third largest mobile telephone operator in the country behind KPN and Vodafone.

As part of an acquisition of Tele2 Netherlands by T-Mobile Netherlands, which was announced on December 15, 2017, the previous owner Tele2 AB became a 25% shareholder in T-Mobile Netherlands. The company is now called Odido.

=== Poland ===
T-Mobile Polska serves over thirteen million customers, and owns licenses for 900, 1800MHz bands which are used for GSM, 800, 900, 1800, 2100 2600MHz for LTE and 2100 (DSS), 3500MHz for 5G NR NSA. Formerly Era, rebranding took place on 5 June 2011. T-Mobile Poland with Orange Polska have consolidated their infrastructure.

=== Romania ===
Telekom Romania Mobile Communications S.A. is a mobile network company in Romania, wholly owned by OTE, which in turn is controlled by Deutsche Telekom, operating under Telekom brand. Telekom Romania Mobile had 3.5 million subscribers with 15% market share as of July 2021.

=== Slovakia ===
The T-Mobile brand entered the Slovak market in May 2005, after rebranding the EuroTel network from Eurotel Bratislava to T-Mobile Slovensko nowadays Telekom. The company Eurotel Bratislava was partially owned by Slovak Telekom, an incumbent fixed-line operator, which later acquired a one hundred percent stake in Eurotel Bratislava. T-Mobile International and DT never owned T-Mobile Slovensko directly; DT is partially owner of Slovak Telekom and thus T-Mobile International has procurement managing function within T-Mobile Slovensko. On 1 July 2010, Slovak Telekom and T-Mobile Slovensko merged into one company on the Slovak market under the name Telekom; T-Mobile brand no more remains active in the mobile-business area, as well as the T-Com in the fixed-business area.

The Telekom network provides services on three networks GSM (900/1800 MHz), UMTS (2100 MHz), Flash OFDM (450 MHz). Mobile data services are provided on 4G, 3G, GSM network with EDGE extension and on UMTS with DC-HSPA+ 42 Mbit/s and HSUPA 5,8 Mbit/s. Flash OFDM is one of two commercially successfully launched solely data networks in the world. It supports upload speed up to 5.8 Mbit/s.

=== United Kingdom ===
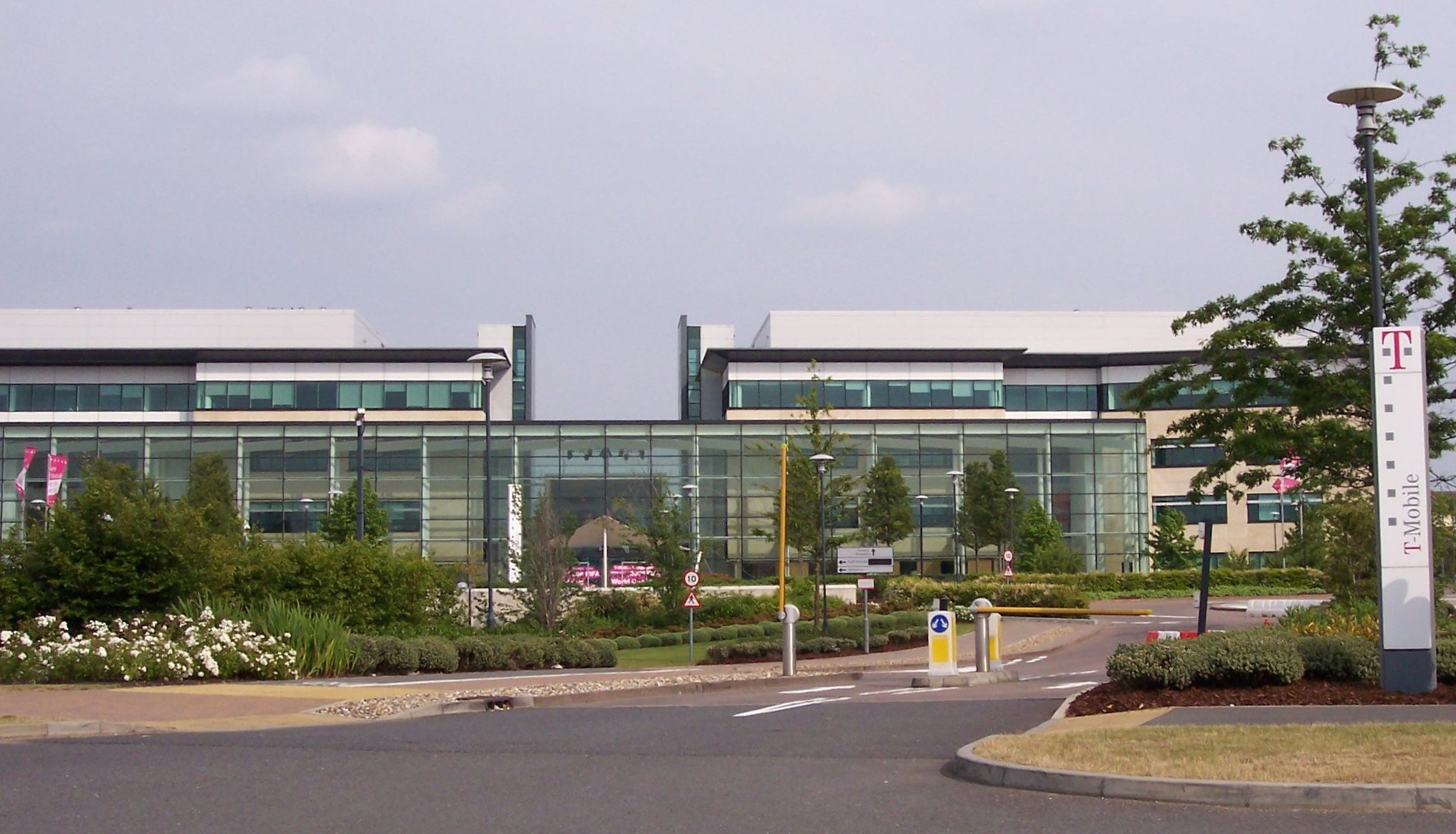
T-Mobile at Hatfield Business Park

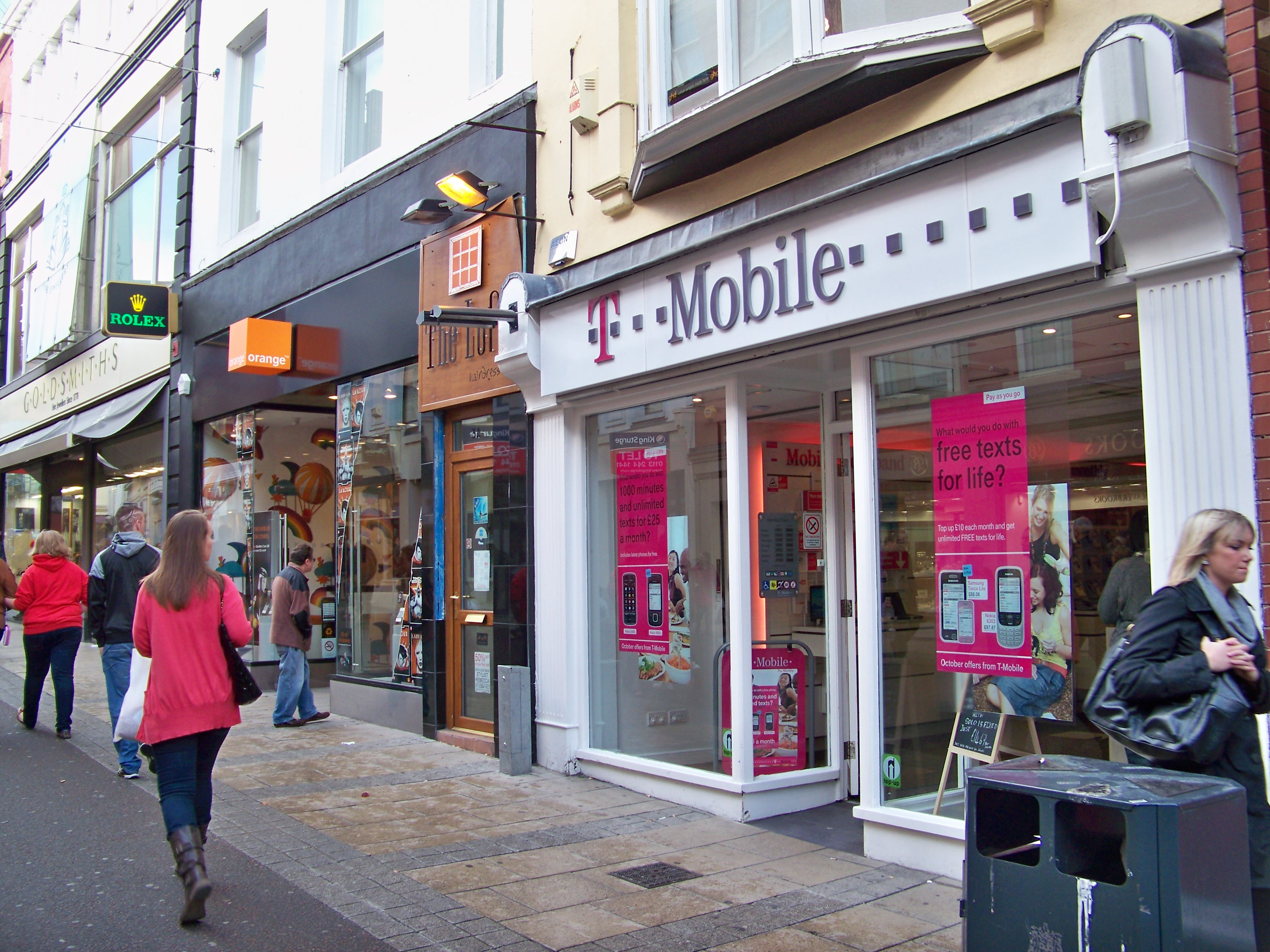
T-Mobile and Orange shops in Leeds

T-Mobile UK started life as Mercury One2One, the world's first GSM 1800 mobile network. It was originally operated by the now-defunct Mercury Communications. Later known simply as one2one, it was purchased by DT in 1999 and rebranded as T-Mobile in 2002.

T-Mobile offered both pay-as-you-go and pay-monthly contract phones. T-Mobile launched their 3G UMTS services in the Autumn of 2003. T-Mobile UK's network was also used as the backbone network behind the Virgin Mobile virtual network.

In late 2007, it was confirmed that the merger of the high-speed 3G and HSDPA networks operated by T-Mobile UK and 3 (UK) was to take place starting January 2008. This left T-Mobile and 3 with the largest HSDPA mobile phone network in the country. In 2009, France Télécom's Orange and DT, T-Mobile's parent, announced they were in advanced talks to merge their UK operations to create the UK's largest mobile operator. In March 2010, the European Commission approved this merger on the condition that the combined company sell 25% of the spectrum it owns on the 1800 MHz radio band and amend a network sharing agreement with smaller rival 3. The merger was completed the following month, the new company's name later being announced as EE. Orange and T-Mobile continued as separate brands in the market until 2015, both run by the new parent company.

T-Mobile UK and Orange UK announced on 15 February 2015 the sale of EE to BT Group for £12.5B and to take shares of 12% within the BT Group as part of the deal.

=== United States ===
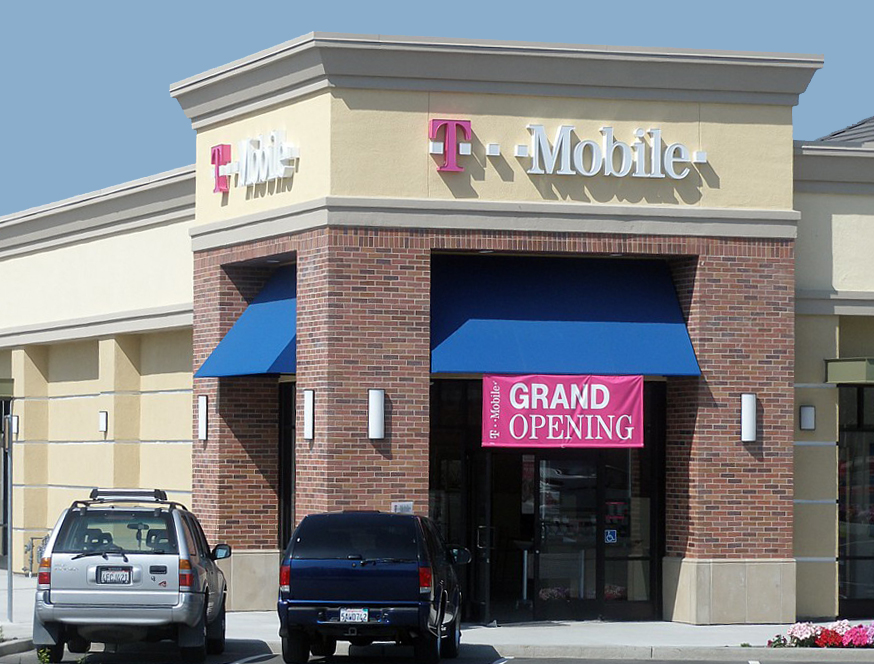
A T-Mobile store in San Jose, California

T-Mobile US provides wireless voice, messaging, and data services in the United States mainland including Alaska, Hawaii, Puerto Rico and the U.S. Virgin Islands under the T-Mobile and Metro by T-Mobile brands. The company has the second-most subscribers in the U.S. market with over 129 million customers and annual revenues of $21.8 billion in 2024. Its nationwide network reaches 98 percent of Americans, through its EDGE 2G/HSPA 3G/HSPA+ 4G/4G LTE networks, as well as through roaming agreements (see section: Radio frequency spectrum chart). As of 2018, J. D. Power and Associates, a global marketing-information-services firm, ranked the company highest among major wireless carriers for retail-store satisfaction four years consecutively and highest for wireless customer care two years consecutively.

The company owns licences to operate a 1900 MHz GSM PCS digital cellular network and AWS UMTS digital cellular networks using 600 MHz, 700 MHz, 850 MHz, 1700 MHz and 2100 MHz covering areas of the continental U.S., Alaska, Hawaii, Puerto Rico and the U.S. Virgin Islands. It provides coverage in areas where it does not own radio frequency spectrum licenses via roaming agreements with other operators of compatible networks. In addition to its cellular mobile network, T-Mobile US operates a nationwide Wi-Fi Internet-access network under the T-Mobile HotSpots brand. The T-Mobile HotSpot service offers access to a nationwide network of approximately 8,350 access points, installed in venues such as Starbucks coffeehouses, FedEx Office Office and Print Centers, Hyatt hotels and resorts, Red Roof Inns, Sofitel hotels, Novotel hotels, the airline clubs of American Airlines, Delta Air Lines, United Airlines and US Airways, and airports.

T-Mobile US, Inc. traces its roots to the 1994 establishment of VoiceStream Wireless PCS as a subsidiary of Western Wireless Corporation. Spun off from parent Western Wireless on 3 May 1999, VoiceStream Wireless Corporation was purchased by Deutsche Telekom on 31 May 2001, for $35 billion and renamed T-Mobile USA, Inc. in July 2002. This legacy is reflected in some mismatch between US and German T-Mobile service, notably the frequency mismatch making phones inoperative in the other country, and picture messaging issues (non-delivery of pictures in text messages) between those networks.

After a failed attempt by AT&T in 2011 to purchase the company in a $39 billion stock and cash offer (which was withdrawn after being faced with significant regulatory and legal hurdles, along with heavy resistance from the U.S. government and the Sprint Corporation), T-Mobile USA announced its intent to merge with MetroPCS Communications, Inc., the sixth largest carrier in the U.S., to improve its competitiveness with other national carriers; the deal was approved by the Department of Justice and Federal Communications Commission in March 2013. The merger agreement gave Deutsche Telekom the option to sell its 72% stake in the merged company, valued at around $14.2 billion, to a third-party before the end of the 18-month lock-up period. On 1 May 2013, the combined company, now known as T-Mobile US, began trading on the New York Stock Exchange as a public company.

==== Merger with Sprint ====
On 29 April 2018, T-Mobile and Sprint announced a $26 billion merger deal, with the resulting company to operate under the name T-Mobile. Federal Communications Commission Chairman Ajit Pai announced that he would back the merger. On 11 February 2020, the deal was approved by a federal judge. The merger was completed on 1 April 2020 with Deutsche Telekom holding owning 43% of the company, SoftBank at 24% and the remaining 33% to the public shareholders.

As part of the merger, T-Mobile US acquired Assurance Wireless, the service subsidized by the federal Lifeline Assistance program, a government benefit program supported by the federal Universal Service Fund.

== Marketing ==
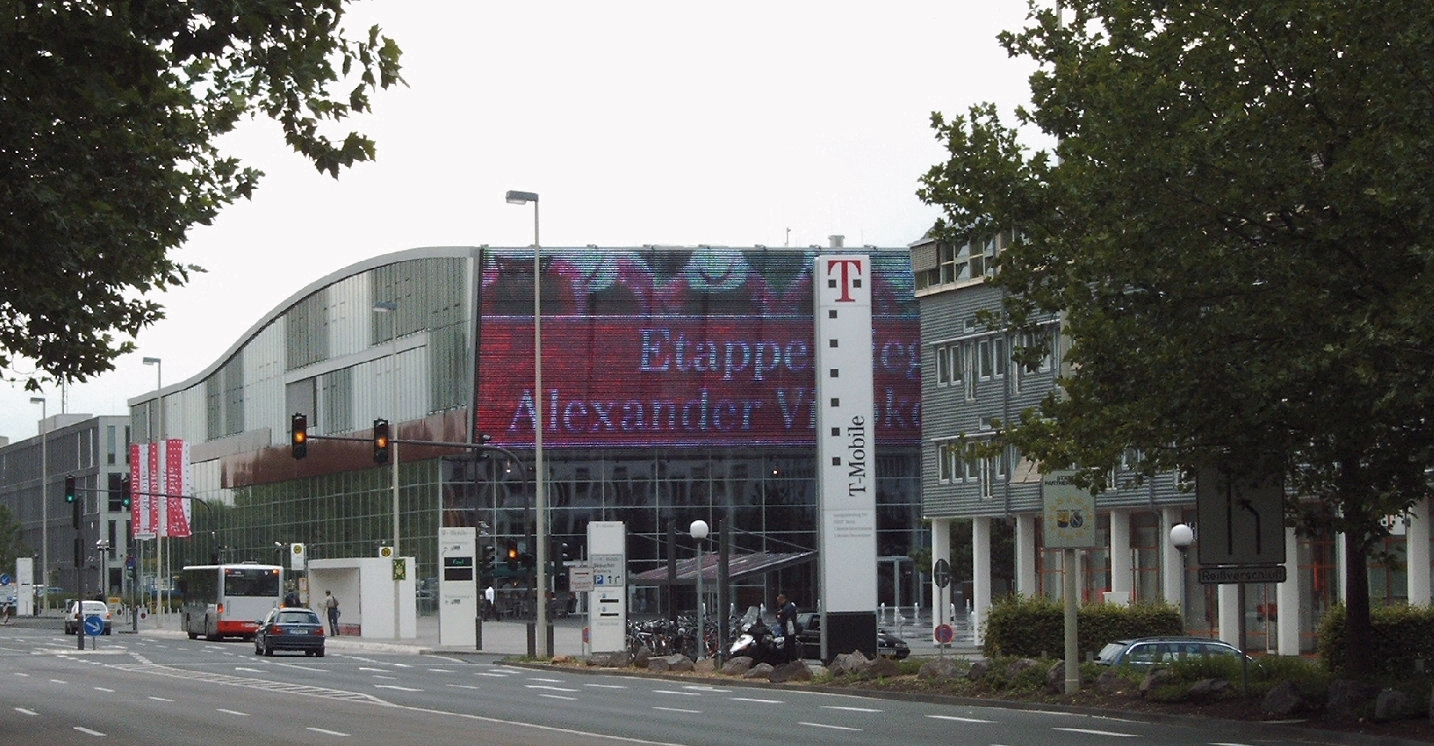
T-Mobile corporate headquarters, Bonn

The company prominently uses the color magenta in its marketing and is known to pursue legal action against other companies who attempt to use similar shades for their advertising.

The five-note T-Mobile audio logo was composed by Lance Massey in 1999, and was originally part of the song ("Hello Hola" by Clan Chi) used to promote DT's Tour de France bicycle team.

=== Sponsorships ===
T-Mobile, specifically the T-Mobile US subsidiary in the United States, holds the naming rights to T-Mobile Arena on the Las Vegas Strip near Las Vegas, to T-Mobile Center in Kansas City and to T-Mobile Park in Seattle.

Deutsche Telekom, has served as the kit sponsor for German Bundesliga club Bayern Munich since 2002. T-Mobile was also the official sponsor of English Football League Championship side West Bromwich Albion from 2004 to 2008 and previously sponsored Rotherham United from 2002 to 2003 as well as Scottish Premier League clubs Rangers and Celtic.

T-Mobile co-sponsored Everton with the One2One brand and they also sponsored the 2002 FA Youth Cup Final. T-Mobile was also a kit sponsor for English club Birmingham City. The phone company is also involved in sponsoring leagues such as the Austrian Football Bundesliga, which is named the T-Mobile Bundesliga. It was also the official global mobile phone carrier for the 2006 FIFA World Cup football tournament in Germany and sponsored its own cycling team, the T-Mobile Team (later Team HTC-High Road).

T-Mobile also has banner ads at some matches of Mexico's top association football league, Liga MX, despite not having a presence in that country.

Since 2016, the wireless company has sponsored the Major League Baseball Home Run Derby.

== See also ==
- 2009 Sidekick data loss
- Electronic Beats
- Open Handset Alliance
- T-Mobile Ekstraklasa
- T-Mobile Team
- T-Online
