= Schengen Routing =

European internet routing policy

The main idea of Schengen Routing is to apply a European internet routing policy such that when sender and recipient are inside the Schengen Area, data between the two endpoints is also routed entirely within the Schengen area.

There is no need to isolate users or restrict the access to the Internet. Seen from another perspective users accessing data in countries outside the European Union will have no profit from this solution, since the communication partner (no matter if source or destination) is not covered by the "Schengen Routing" agreement. Currently the main contributor seems to be Deutsche Telekom, as depicted from an interview of Philip Blank where they describe that "data running over Telekom's German networks stays in this country". This could be seen as a starting point, because if only one Internet service provider supports "Schengen Routing" the traffic to other providers may leave the country. In addition, most users do not know which providers are connected (peering). They should only have the goal to use national services and the rest has to be done by the providers.

== Applicability ==
Routing traffic only in a providers network might be easily achievable for the simple reason that an Internet service provider can control their own network, but how can a European-wide "Schengen Routing" be implemented? There must be an exchange between routing possibilities and much more sensible Internet service provider information to ensure that data, sent from one Internet service provider to another, arising not to leave "Schengen Routing" area really stays with these boundaries. For example, these aspects lead to the fact that QSC AG, a Deutsche Telekom competitor, raised the question about the possibility of protecting traffic with this approach, since it might be impossible to determine data that would travel nationally or internationally.

In the latest reports the governments of France and Germany could act as a key player in introducing "Schengen Routing". The German Chancellor Angela Merkel and the French President François Hollande picked up the topic in order to establish a European communications network that is beyond the reach of US security officials. An initiative from the government might push the development of a "Schengen Routing" area. However more and more people doubt that a European communications network would indeed lead to more security, because they argue that it would not be a problem for security agencies to set up more surveillance stations within Europe to capture data. Since this is true several politicians (e.g. Jan Philipp Albrecht - German member of the European Parliament) stated the fact that a legal framework to secure the fundamental rights in Europe, especially in the market area, is much more important.

In the scope of economics, "Schengen Routing" seems to be a big chance to generate revenues, since every Internet service provider can provide special offers for data storage with the European Union or selected countries. In addition, special rates can be introduced to guarantee "Schengen Routing" at your Internet connection.

From the research community perspective, the goal is to let users and companies aware of the security impacts from not having a compliant Schengen routing policy. Thus, the involved parties are able to protect their data by supporting and using recently developed approaches for secure data storage and exchange.

== Reasons for Schengen Routing ==
The reasons arguing for "Schengen Routing" are manifold, but all are based on security and privacy issues of data. Data can be divided into industrial relevant and personal relevant data. The former represents a target for industrial espionage by a competitor, whereas the latter focuses more on surveillance by security agencies which try to get personal data from possible criminals.

Since the data traveling through the Internet has the opportunity to leave the area protected by the national law of the data owner, the legal situation is unclear. The removal of this lack of clarity is a main goal of "Schengen Routing". The legal situation is much clearer and the justice can easily protect the national law, if transferred data, when source and destination of data are in the same country, is not leaving the national area. For the reason that most of the data traveling through the Internet is routed through neighbor countries, because of the nature of the Internet to connect people and data, a bigger area than a national wide one would be more reasonable. Furthermore, a Schengen wide routing policy, which has to be implemented, is an opportunity to include data protection and reduce network neutrality aspects at the same time. Also the technical aspects of such routing restrictions have to be taken into account. Expanding the area from national wide to the European Union area enhances the trade-off between network neutrality and data protection, thereby the idea of "Schengen Routing" was born. If routing policies manipulate the traffic flow to remain inside the European Union, they can also manipulate other types of traffic or their quality of service behavior.

== Controversy ==
Researchers published the results of a large-scale measurement to quantify Schengen routing compliance. The measurements were carried in 1100 different autonomous systems in the Schengen area, and it was found that only 34.5% to 39.7% of the routes are Schengen compliant, while compliance levels varied from 0% to 80% among countries—depending on the Internet protocol used (i.e., UDP, TCP, or ICMP) and location. The main conclusion is that Schengen routing compliance is not achieved in any of the Schengen members, contradicting the claim that Schengen routing was already a factual reality, as it has been stated by the Association of the German Internet Industry and Deutsche Telekom.
