= Ron Sommer =

Austrian manager

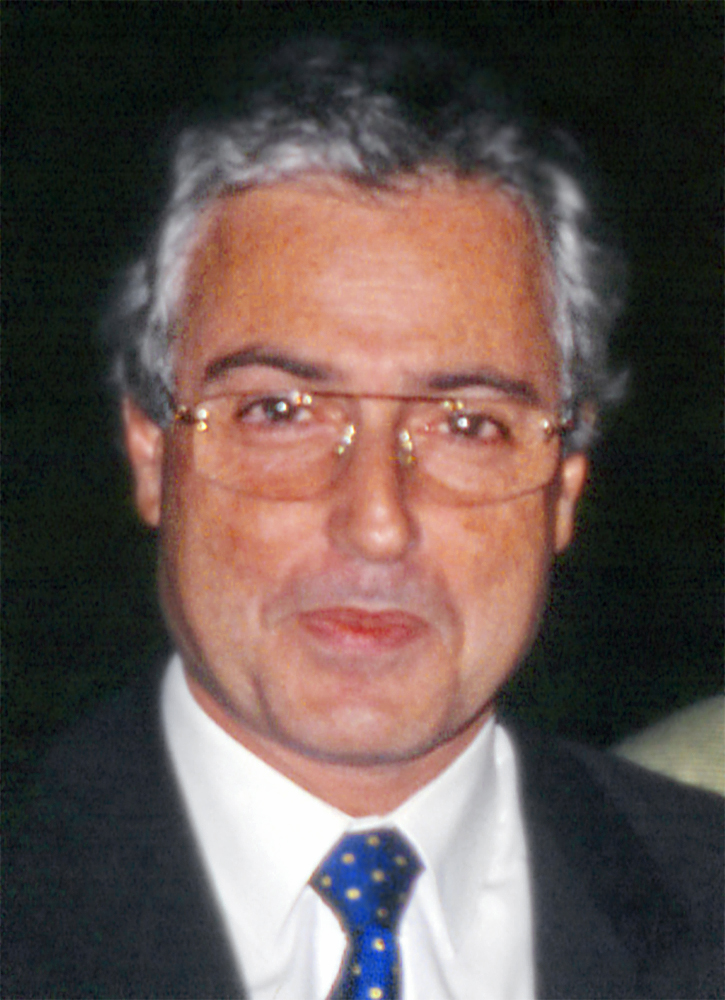
- Ron Sommer in 1997
- Born: Aaron Lebowitsch; 1949 (age 76–77); Haifa, Israel
- Occupation: Business executive
- Known for: Former CEO of Deutsche Telekom

Ron Sommer (Hebrew: רון סאמר) is an Austrian business executive who was the former CEO of Deutsche Telekom. Sommer is Chairman of the International Advisory Council of the Russian Sistema Group, where he was elected to the Executive Board in June 2005.

== Early life ==
Sommer was born in 1949 in Haifa, Israel, the son of Jewish parents. His mother had fled Bessarabia (now Moldova) in 1943 and his father had emigrated from Würzburg to Palestine in 1935. After his parents separated, Sommer moved with his mother and her new partner to Vienna, where he adopted the name of his stepfather.

He studied mathematics at the University of Vienna and was awarded a doctorate at the age of 21 in 1971 with the title "Limit theorems on the entropy of number-theoretic transformations". Sommer's PhD supervisor was Fritz Schweiger.

== Career ==
=== Nixdorf & Sony ===
Sommer moved to New York at the age of 24 to work for Q1 Corp., a small computer company that was taken over in 1974 by the German Nixdorf Computer AG. After a brief stopover in Germany, he became head of the Nixdorf branch in Paris for two years in 1977, later heading overseas. In 1980 Sommer moved to the Japanese Sony Group, where ten years later he became the executive chair in the United States and in 1993 President and COO of Sony Europe.

=== Deutsche Telekom ===
On May 16, 1995, Sommer became CEO of Deutsche Telekom. Initially successful, Sommer resigned on 16 July 2002 from his post on the grounds that the relationship of trust with the Supervisory Board was disrupted. The German government, Deutsche Telekom's main shareholder, had pushed Sommer to resign after massive losses due to the stock market crisis from 2001 and Deutsche Telekom's high corporate debt levels. After initial speculation, denied by Deutsche Telekom, that Sommer would receive compensation of 65 million euros, Sommer's severance pay was only 11.6 million euros. In May 2008, it became known that during Sommer's tenure as chief executive officer of Deutsche Telekom, staff and journalists were systematically spied on to uncover potential sources of leaked information within the company.

=== Supervisory board mandates and consulting contracts ===
Sommer is a member of the Supervisory Board of Munich Re. From May 2004 to December 31, 2006, he was a member of the supervisory board of the former German chemical company Celanese. Since July 2004 Sommer has been a member of the board of directors of the US group Motorola. Since May 2003, he has been Chairman of the International Advisory Council of the Russian Sistema Group. As a consultant, Sommer is closely associated with the investment firm The Blackstone Group LP, which holds interests in Celanese and Deutsche Telekom. Since September 2006, Sommer has been a member of the board of directors of the Indian company Tata Consultancy Services.

== Recognition ==
- 1998: As a representative of Deutsche Telekom, Sommer received the "Sprachpanscher des Jahres" mock award for the terms "Sunshine- und Moonshine-Tarif, Short-Distance-Call, City-Call und German-Call."
- 1999: Awarded the "Cicero-Rednerpreis".
- 1999: Dr. med. Kurt Neven DuMont Medal of the Westdeutsche Akademie für Kommunikation.

== Publications ==
- Peter Glotz: Ron Sommer. Hoffmann & Campe, Hamburg 2001, ISBN 3-455-09332-9.
- Walter Filz: "Spekulation Sommer". Radio play. Director: Walter Filz, Production: SWR/NDR 2005.
