= CETIN =

Company in Czechia

CETIN a.s.

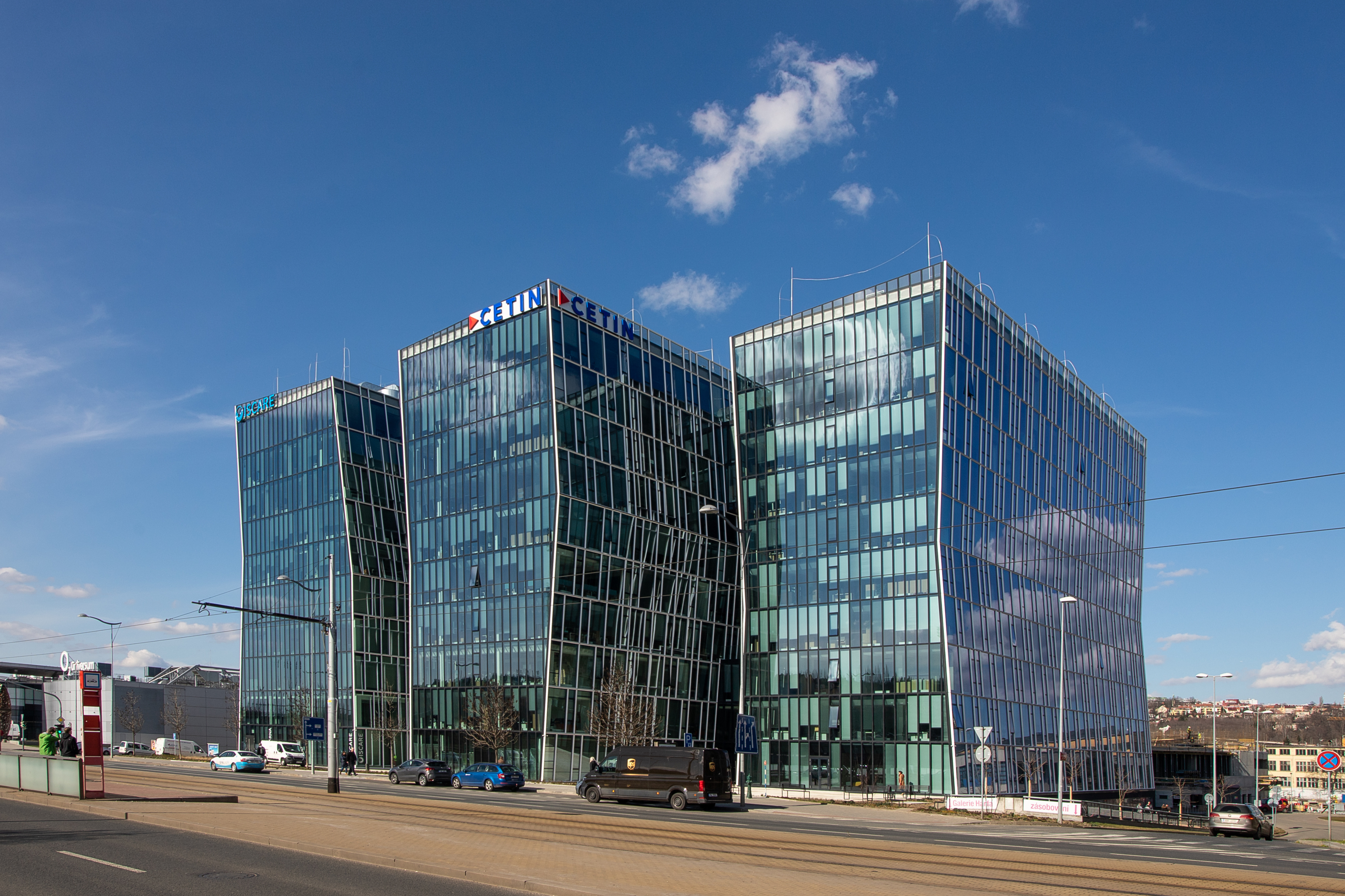
- Type: Subsidiary
- Industry: Telecommunications infrastructure
- Founded: 1 June 2015; 11 years ago
- Headquarters: Prague, Czech Republic
- Services: Wholesale telecommunications infrastructure and network services
- Revenue: CZK 21.492 billion (2024)
- Operating income: CZK 4.451 billion (2024)
- Net income: CZK 1.956 billion (2024)
- Total assets: CZK 68.471 billion (2024)
- Total equity: CZK 23.057 billion (2024)
- Owner: PPF Group
- Number of employees: 2,762 (2024)
- Parent: CETIN Group N.V.
- Website: www.cetin.cz

CETIN a.s. is a Czech wholesale telecommunications infrastructure company headquartered in Prague. It owns and operates fixed and mobile telecommunications networks in the Czech Republic and provides network infrastructure and electronic communications services to telecommunications operators. The company is wholly owned by CETIN Group N.V., which is in turn wholly owned by PPF Group.

CETIN was established on 1 June 2015 through the separation of the telecommunications infrastructure and wholesale business of O2 Czech Republic from its retail operations. Originally named Česká telekomunikační infrastruktura a.s., the company adopted the name CETIN a.s. on 1 January 2020.

== History ==
CETIN was established on 1 June 2015 when O2 Czech Republic separated its telecommunications infrastructure and wholesale business from its retail operations. The fixed network, mobile infrastructure, data centres and related wholesale activities were transferred to the newly created Česká telekomunikační infrastruktura a.s.

PPF Group, which already controlled about 95% of CETIN, acquired the remaining shares through a squeeze-out completed in 2016. The company adopted the name CETIN a.s. on 1 January 2020.

Also in 2020, PPF separated the infrastructure businesses of its telecommunications operators in Bulgaria, Hungary and Serbia and combined them with the Czech CETIN business under CETIN Group. Singaporean sovereign wealth fund GIC acquired a 30% stake in the group in 2022, while PPF retained 70%.

In 2024, CETIN Group was reorganised as part of PPF's partnership with the UAE telecommunications group e&. Its infrastructure businesses in Bulgaria, Hungary and Serbia were transferred out of the group, leaving the Czech CETIN business within CETIN Group. PPF subsequently repurchased GIC's 30% stake and again became the group's sole owner.

== Network and operations ==
CETIN operates telecommunications infrastructure on a wholesale basis and does not provide services directly to end users. Its customers include O2 Czech Republic, T-Mobile Czech Republic and Vodafone Czech Republic, as well as other telecommunications operators.

The company operates the largest fixed-access network in the Czech Republic, using both fibre-optic and metallic lines. It provides wholesale broadband access, leased lines, network interconnection and data-centre services. At the end of 2025, the network had about 1.32 million active fixed connections and an average available download speed of 507 Mbit/s. The number of active FTTH/B connections increased by 23% during the year.

CETIN also owns and operates mobile network infrastructure. Under a network-sharing agreement with T-Mobile Czech Republic, CETIN operates the radio access network in the eastern part of the country, while T-Mobile operates the corresponding network in the west. Prague and Brno are excluded from the geographic sharing arrangement.

CETIN reported that its rollout of 5G technology was largely completed by the end of 2025.
