= QSC =

QSC may refer to:

== Corporations ==
- QSC AG, a German telecommunications and DSL provider
- QSC Audio Products aka Q-SYS, a global audio, video, and control platform manufacturer based in California
- Queens Surface Corporation, a former bus company in New York City

== Colleges ==
- Queen's School of Computing, a department of Queen's University in Kingston, Ontario, Canada
- Quirino State College, former name of Quirino State University in Quirino, Philippines

== Other uses ==
- QSC, the IATA airport code for São Carlos Airport in Brazil
- QSC, a radiotelegraphic Q code meaning "are you a cargo vessel" when posed as a question
- qSc, a portion of the equation defining the pitching moment coefficient of an airfoil
- Quebec Superior Court, the trial-level superior court of the province of Quebec, Canada
- Queens Sports Club, a stadium in Bulawayo, Zimbabwe
- QSC&V (Quality, Service, Cleanliness & Value), a quality benchmark used by McDonald's Corporation
- QSC supercomputer (2004–2007), a supercomputer at Los Alamos National Laboratory which replaced Blue Mountain (supercomputer)
