= Eurotel =

Eurotel Praha, spol. s r.o.
- Industry: Telecommunications
- Founded: 1990
- Defunct: 1 July 2006
- Fate: Bought by Telefónica, merged with Český Telecom
- Successor: O2 Czech Republic
- Headquarters: Prague, Czech Republic
- Products: Mobile telephony
- Revenue: Kč 29.4 billion (2004)
- Number of employees: 2,486 (2006)

Eurotel Bratislava logo

Old Eurotel CZ logo, used in Czech Republic until 2001

Eurotel was the trade name of the first mobile phone network in Czechoslovakia. Given the possibility of a forthcoming of split of Czechoslovakia into two separate countries, Eurotel was formed as two separate legal entities: Eurotel Praha and Eurotel Bratislava.

Both Eurotel companies were founded in 1990 as joint ventures between SPT Telecom (51%) and the American joint venture company, Atlantic West, B.V. (49% split evenly between US WEST International, Inc. and Bell Atlantic International Inc.). Each Eurotel company initially was assigned the rights to deploy packet data networks and mobile phone services using the NMT450 technology. The first calls on each network were made in 1991. The packet data network elements did not grow as rapidly as hoped for and was later ceded back to the 51% Czech and Slovak landline operators. The mobile business grew briskly and both Eurotel companies were later granted GSM licenses for both the Czech Republic and Slovakia.

The USWest interests were assigned first to MediaOne and later to AT&T. Ultimately, Český Telecom purchased the Eurotel Prague and Deutsche Telekom purchased Eurotel Bratislava. The Czech and Slovak businesses continued till the present as represented by O2 in the Czech Republic and Deutsche Telekom in Slovakia.

Both companies were initially financed by the first EBRD financing in either the Czech Republic or Slovakia. In March 2000, EuroTel Bratislava successfully closed a Euro 175 million high yield bond offering, and became one of the first companies in Central Europe to access the public capital markets. This financing was one of many sequential financings that funded extraordinarily rapid growth in a capital intensive industry.

In July 2000, Deutsche Telekom purchased a 51% stake in Slovak Telecom. It was later rebranded to T-Mobile Slovakia in May 2005.

In 2005, Český Telecom was acquired by the Spanish company Telefónica.

On March 1, 2006 it was announced that Český Telecom and Eurotel would merge their operations into one company, Telefónica O2 Czech Republic, which was to take place in mid-2006.

== See also ==
- Slovak Telekom
