= Telekom Deutschland =

German telecommunications company

Telekom Deutschland GmbH

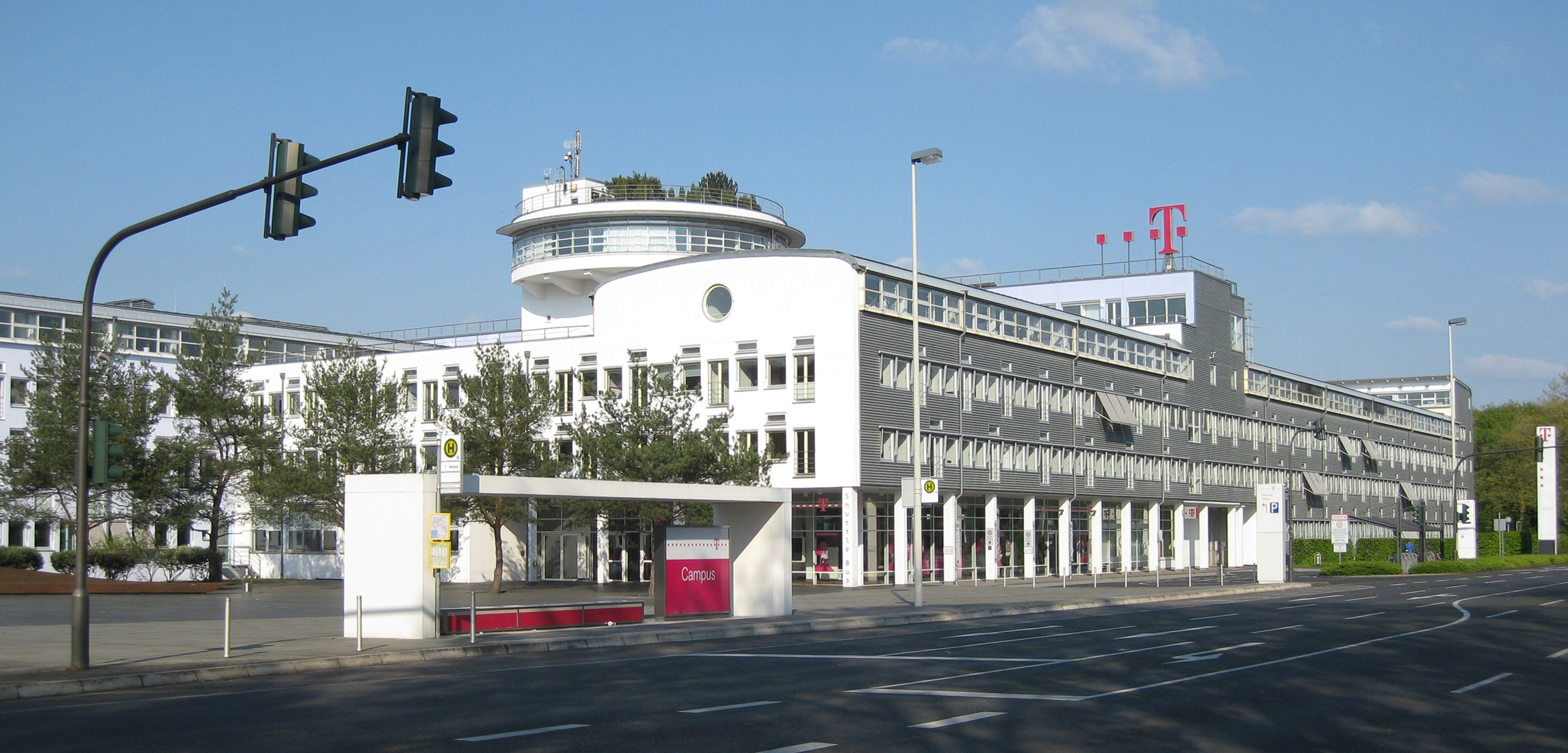
- Telekom Deutschland's headquarters in Bonn
- Formerly: T-Mobile Deutschland GmbH
- Type: Private
- Industry: Telecommunications
- Founded: July 1, 1992; 34 years ago in Bonn, Germany
- Headquarters: Bonn, Germany
- Area served: Germany
- Parent: Deutsche Telekom
- Website: telekom.de

Telekom Deutschland GmbH (formerly T-Mobile Deutschland GmbH) is a German telecommunications company owned by Deutsche Telekom. Telekom offers landline phone, broadband, IPTV and mobile telephony services. It took its current name after Deutsche Telekom's German consumer fixed-line unit T-Home was merged into T-Mobile Deutschland.

As of 2023, it had 17 million fixed-line subscribers and 61 million mobile subscribers, making it the largest mobile network operator in Germany. By 2025, the number of mobile customers in Germany increased to 74.5 million, while fixed-network lines reached 16.8 million.

== History ==
=== Early mobile phone networks in Germany (1985-1994) ===
Germany's first mobile-communications services were radiotelephone systems that were owned and operated by the state postal monopoly, Deutsche Bundespost. It launched the analog first-generation C-Netz ("C Network", marketed as C-Tel), Germany's first true mobile phone network in 1985.

On 1 July 1989, West Germany reorganized Deutsche Bundespost and consolidated telecommunications into a new unit, Deutsche Bundespost Telekom.

On 1 July 1992, it began to operate Germany's first GSM network under the name De.Te.Mobil Deutsche Telekom Mobilfunk GmbH. It took over the car phone network activities of Deutsche Bundespost which operated B-Netz (until 1994) and C-Netz (until 2000). By the end of 1993, the company had 480,000 customers. In March 1994, the first SMS was sent over the network.

=== Privatization and deregulation (1995-2000) ===
Deutsche Bundespost Telekom was renamed Deutsche Telekom AG on 1 January 1995 as part of phase two of the German communications reform.

Telekom Deutschland's fixed line operations originated from T-Com, a legal successor to Deutsche Bundespost Telekom. T-Com was created after the German postal reform.

The mobile brand name was changed to DeTeMobil Deutsche Telekom MobilNet GmbH (T-Mobil), while the network was named T-D1. The GSM 900 MHz frequency band was referred to as the "D-Netz".

This deregulation of the German telecommunications industry continued in November 1996, when DT was privatized and had the largest European IPO at the time, with the stock abbreviation 'DT 1'.

In 1998, T-Mobil was assigned 0170 as an additional area code in addition to 0171 by the Regulatory Authority for Telecommunications and Post (RegTP).

=== 2G and 3G network expansion (2000-2010) ===
In June 2000, T-Mobil became the first mobile network operator in the world to launch a GPRS network. The C-Netz network was switched off in the same year.

In February 2002, DeTeMobil Deutsche Telekom MobilNet GmbH was renamed to T-Mobile Deutschland GmbH. In July of the same year, T-Mobile launched the Multimedia Messaging Service (MMS).

On 1 March 2007, then Deutsche Telekom CEO René Obermann announced that the group's brand identity would be radically simplified from summer 2007 onwards meaning T-Home became the universal brand for Deutsche Telekom's fixed-line services.

On 19 June 2007, T-Mobile switched on the High Speed Packet Access (HSPA) network in high density connection areas, it allowed download speeds of up to 7.2 Mbit/s. In 2008, T-Mobile's EDGE network was upgraded to allow up to 260 kbit/s download speeds.

=== Brand consolidation and LTE expansion (2010-2019) ===
On 1 April 2010, T-Home was merged into T-Mobile Deutschland GmbH and the company was renamed as Telekom Deutschland GmbH. On 20 May 2010, Telekom Deutschland participated in the largest German frequency auction to date.

On 1 December 2010, Telekom began testing LTE in Baden-Württemberg and Brandenburg. On 5 April 2011, LTE was launched in the Call & Surf via Funk tariff which was intended as a DSL alternative for areas which have limited fixed-line speeds.

Cologne became the first city in which Telekom enabled the 1800 MHz frequency of LTE, with service launched on 1 June 2010. On 2 November 2010, Telekom enabled HD Voice on their UMTS network.

On 17 June 2014, Telekom announced that they would not charge for LTE roaming in Belgium, France, Italy, Norway, Poland, Spain, or the United Kingdom.

=== Deployment of 5G network (2019–present) ===
On July 3, 2019, Deutsche Telekom launched Germany's first 5G network for customers in Bonn and Berlin.

== Wireless networks ==
The following is a list of known frequencies that Telekom employs or plans to employ in Germany.

Frequency	Technology	Generation	Status	Band
900 MHz	GSM	2G	Active	8
800 MHz	LTE	4G	Active	20
900 MHz	LTE	4G	Active	8
1500 MHz	LTE	4G	Active	32
1800 MHz	LTE	4G	Active	3
2100 MHz	LTE	4G	Active	1
2600 MHz	LTE	4G	Active	7
700 MHz	NR	5G-NSA	Under construction	n28
2100 MHz	NR	5G-NSA	Active	n1
3,6 GHz	NR	5G-NSA	Under construction	n78

== See also ==
- List of mobile network operators in Europe
- T-Mobile (brand)
