= Tropolys =

- Industry: Telecommunications
- Defunct: July 2005
- Successor: Versatel Deutschland

Tropolys is a German telecommunications company operating on the German market. In July 2005 it merged with Versatel Deutschland and the merge was completed in January 2006.
