= Odido =

Dutch mobile phone network operator

Odido Netherlands Holding B.V.
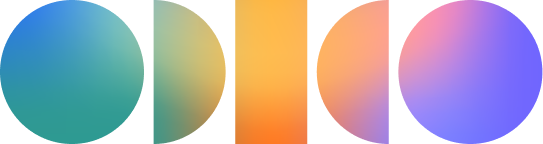
- Formerly: Ben Nederland (1999–2003); T-Mobile Netherlands (2003–2023)
- Type: Private
- Industry: Wireless telecommunications
- Predecessors: Orange Nederland (acquired 2007); Tele2 Netherlands (acquired 2019)
- Founded: Incorporated: 5 July 1984; Founded as Ben Nederland: 1998; 28 years ago
- Headquarters: The Hague, Netherlands
- Area served: Netherlands
- Key people: Søren Abildgaard, CEO; Gero Niemeyer, CFO; Kim Larsen, CTO; Leon Toet, Business to Business director; Tisha van Lammeren, Consumer director
- Products: Mobile telephony Wireless broadband
- Revenue: €2.31 billion (2024)
- Operating income: €500 million (2015)
- Owner: Apax Partners (50 %); Warburg Pincus (50 %)
- Number of employees: 2,033 (2024)
- Subsidiaries: Ben; Tele2 Thuis; Simpel
- Website: www.odido.nl

Odido Netherlands (formerly T-Mobile Netherlands) is the largest mobile phone company in the Netherlands. It was owned by Deutsche Telekom before being sold to WP/AP Telecom Holdings IV B.V., a joint venture between Warburg Pincus and Apax Partners. From 2021–23, it licensed the T-Mobile brand name from Deutsche Telekom. As of January 2024, it had 6.9 million customers.

On 5 September 2023, both the T-Mobile and Tele2 Mobile were rebranded altogether under one brand as Odido.

In February 2026, Odido's customer service system was broken into with data leaked on 6.5 million users and 600,000 companies in one of the largest private data leaks in Dutch history.

== History ==
Deutsche Telekom entered the Dutch market by the acquisition of Ben on 20 September 2002. In 2007, T-Mobile Netherlands, a wholly owned subsidiary of T-Mobile International, acquired Orange Netherlands from France Télécom for EUR 1.33 billion. This made it the third largest mobile telephone operator in the country behind KPN and VodafoneZiggo. Prior to its 2019 merger, Tele2 Netherlands used to use T-Mobile's infrastructure for the old 3G and 2G bands, as it only had a licence for the 4G band.

On September 7, 2021, T-Mobile Netherlands was purchased by WP/AP Telecom Holdings IV B.V.; a joint venture between Warburg Pincus and Apax Partners. The transaction stood at 5.1 billion euros gaining full control of the company from the former shareholders of Deutsche Telekom and Tele2.

=== Capacity problems ===
T-Mobile announced in May 2010 that it was dealing with major capacity problems on its 3G network. T-Mobile admitted the problems after much pressure from customers and the Dutch media. T-Mobile could not keep up with the growing data demand from smartphones, caused by the number of new customers who wanted an iPhone: T-Mobile in the Netherlands failed to keep up with the demand, and capacity problems on the network were the result. T-Mobile denied the problems at first by telling complaining customers that their mobile phone or SIM-card was causing the problem.

The capacity problems occurred mostly in cities and densely populated areas. When affected, people could experience problems with calling or receiving calls, text messaging (SMS), or data services. A substantial number of customers were not able to use any of these services in cities or urban areas when the network capacity was overloaded, for instance, the cities of Amsterdam and Utrecht were heavily impacted.

After being put under pressure by several consumer interest groups and the Dutch media, as well as criticism from Dutch comedian Youp van 't Hek, T-Mobile started a cash-back settlement for all consumers who had complained about failing communication services.

T-Mobile invested tens of millions of euros to upgrade its network. The upgrade was completed around the end of the first quarter of 2011.

=== Acquisition of Vodafone Thuis ===
In August 2016, after Ziggo and Vodafone Netherlands announced their merger, the European Commission required Vodafone to split off their fixed-line Internet business, as a condition to approve the merger. T-Mobile Netherlands reached an agreement to acquire Vodafone Thuis in November 2016, taking over their 150,000 customers. The deal was completed in December 2016. The service was rebranded T-Mobile Thuis on 15 February 2017.

=== Acquisition of Tele2 Netherlands ===
In December 2017, T-Mobile announced its intent to buy Tele2 Netherlands. After a delay because of a European Commission investigation, the merger was completed in January 2019.

=== IPTV TV service Knippr ===
On 9 June 2016 T-Mobile Netherlands launched IPTV service Knippr in the Netherlands. After 2 years on 1 June 2018 the service has been stopped due to the lack of customers.

=== 2026 hacking incident ===
In February 2026, it was announced that Odido's customer service system (provided by Salesforce) was broken into by the hacking group ShinyHunters. This was one of the largest private data leaks in Dutch history. After Odido refused a ransom payment, substantial personally identifiable information on 6.5 million private customers and 600,000 companies was released by the hackers on March 1, 2026 after several smaller datasets were published multiple times earlier on the same week, intended to pressure Odido to pay for the ransom.

The hackers themselves had previously mentioned having stolen up to 8 million people's private data.

The breached data includes full names, physical and e-mail addresses, phone and account numbers, IBAN account numbers, date of birth and passport and/or driver's license information, along with extremely sensitive information about financial guardianship, debts and other notes about customer conduct and interaction history. Odido itself did not notice the breach until it was made public by the hackers.

The full release redacted some data, namely bank account numbers and internal customer service notes; these were present in the smaller leaks uploaded online a few days before publication of the main dataset intended to pressure Odido.

On 17 February 2026, it was also revealed that Odido retained private customer data for much longer than their stated two years, with some prior customers having their personally identifiable information compromised even though they had switched away from Odido reportedly five to ten years before the leak.

=== No IPv6 ===
Odido is the only major provider in the Netherlands that exclusively offers (legacy) IPv4, but no IPv6 to its customers and has expressed a lack of interest in changing that situation.
