= O2 Czech Republic =

Czech telecommunications company and subsidiary of O2

O2 Czech Republic, a.s.
- Type: Joint-stock company
- ISIN: CZ0009093209
- Industry: Telecommunications
- Founded: December 16, 1993; 32 years ago
- Headquarters: Michle, Prague, Czech Republic
- Products: Mobile and fixed telecommunications, Internet access, digital television, ICT services
- Revenue: ▲ Kč39.659 billion (2025)
- Operating income: ▼ Kč7.459 billion (2025)
- Net income: ▲ Kč6.065 billion (2025)
- Total assets: ▼ Kč32.197 billion (2025)
- Total equity: ▼ Kč8.326 billion (2025)
- Owner: PPF Group
- Number of employees: 3,875 (2025)

Former Český Telecom logo

Former Eurotel logo

O2 Czech Republic a.s. is a Czech telecommunications company headquartered in Prague. It is one of the three mobile network operators in the Czech Republic, alongside T-Mobile Czech Republic and Vodafone Czech Republic, and also provides fixed internet, television and digital services. The company is wholly owned by PPF Group and uses the O2 brand under licence.

The company developed from the former Czech telecommunications operator Český Telecom and mobile operator Eurotel, which were brought together under the O2 brand in 2006. PPF acquired control of the company in 2014. In 2015, its telecommunications infrastructure business was separated into the newly established CETIN, leaving O2 primarily focused on retail telecommunications and digital services. O2 became wholly owned by PPF and was delisted from the Prague Stock Exchange in 2022.

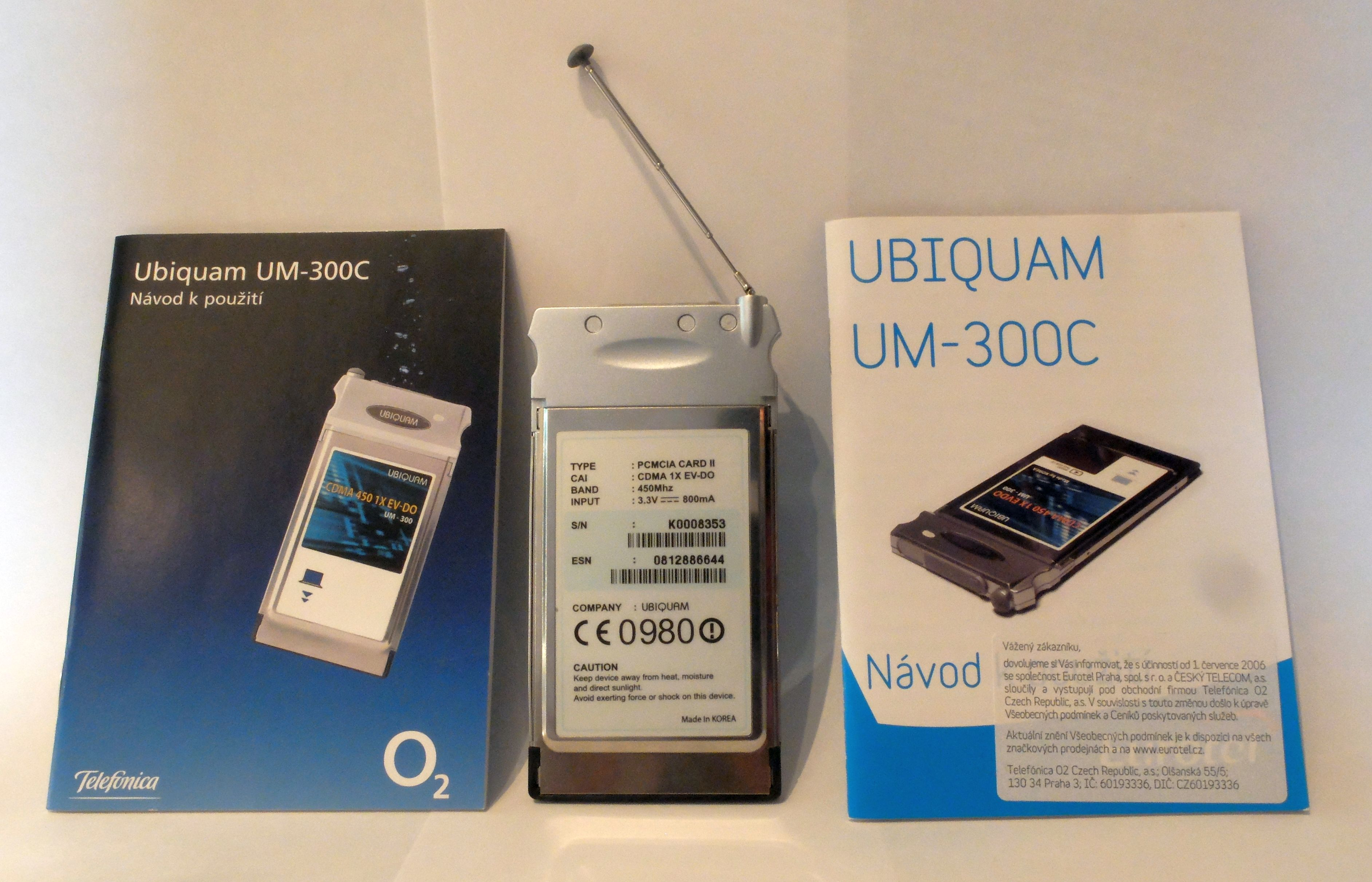
PC Card modem for O2's CDMA network with manuals

== History ==
The company's origins lie in the former state telecommunications operator SPT Telecom (Správa pošt a telekomunikací, state-owned telecommunications company). The state enterprise was reorganized and in 2000 renamed Český Telecom (Czech Telecom). The mobile operator Eurotel was established in 1991 as a joint venture between SPT Telecom, which held a 51% stake, and American joint-venture Atlantic West (between US WEST International, Inc. and Bell Atlantic International Inc.), which held the remaining 49%. Eurotel initially operated an analogue NMT network and later introduced GSM services.

Český Telecom acquired Atlantic West's 49% stake in Eurotel in 2003, becoming its sole owner. In 2005, the Czech government sold its 51.1% stake in Český Telecom to the Spanish multinational telecommunications company Telefónica as part of the company's privatization. On 1 July 2006, Eurotel was merged into Český Telecom and the combined company was renamed Telefónica O2 Czech Republic.

In November 2013, Telefónica agreed to sell a 65.9% stake in its Czech subsidiary to PPF Group for approximately €2.47 billion. The transaction was completed in January 2014, making PPF the company's majority shareholder, and the company was renamed O2 Czech Republic later that year.

On 1 June 2015, O2 was divided through a demerger, with its fixed and mobile telecommunications infrastructure transferred to the newly established CETIN. O2 continued as the retail telecommunications business, while CETIN became the wholesale infrastructure operator. In 2020, O2 extended its licence to use the O2 brand until the end of 2036.

PPF increased its holding to more than 90% in 2021 and subsequently initiated a squeeze-out of the remaining minority shareholders. Trading in O2 shares on the Prague Stock Exchange ended in February 2022, and the remaining shares were transferred to PPF's principal shareholder vehicle on 28 February.

In March 2025, O2 and fellow PPF company TV Nova launched Oneplay, combining O2 TV and Nova's Voyo streaming service into a single television and streaming platform.

== Legal and regulatory matters ==
In 2016, the Czech Telecommunication Office (ČTÚ) fined O2 CZK 4.5 million over its automatic renewal of paid mobile data after customers had used their allowance. The regulator found that customers had not actively agreed to the service and that some had not been properly informed about their right to end their contracts. O2 appealed, but the fine was upheld by the courts in 2018.

The European Commission investigated network-sharing agreements involving O2, CETIN and T-Mobile Czech Republic. In 2019, it said the agreements could reduce competition and discourage investment in separate networks. The case ended in 2022 after the companies agreed to changes intended to address the Commission's concerns.

In August 2026, the Czech Office for the Protection of Competition (ÚOHS) ruled that O2 and Sherlog Technology had divided customers between themselves in the market for vehicle-monitoring and electronic-logbook services. The authority said the conduct had lasted from 2012 to 2022 and fined O2 CZK 262.3 million and Sherlog CZK 18.4 million. The decision was not final, and O2 said it would appeal.

== See also ==
- List of mobile network operators in Europe
