= Congstar =

German mobile network operator

Congstar GmbH
- Logo used since 2023

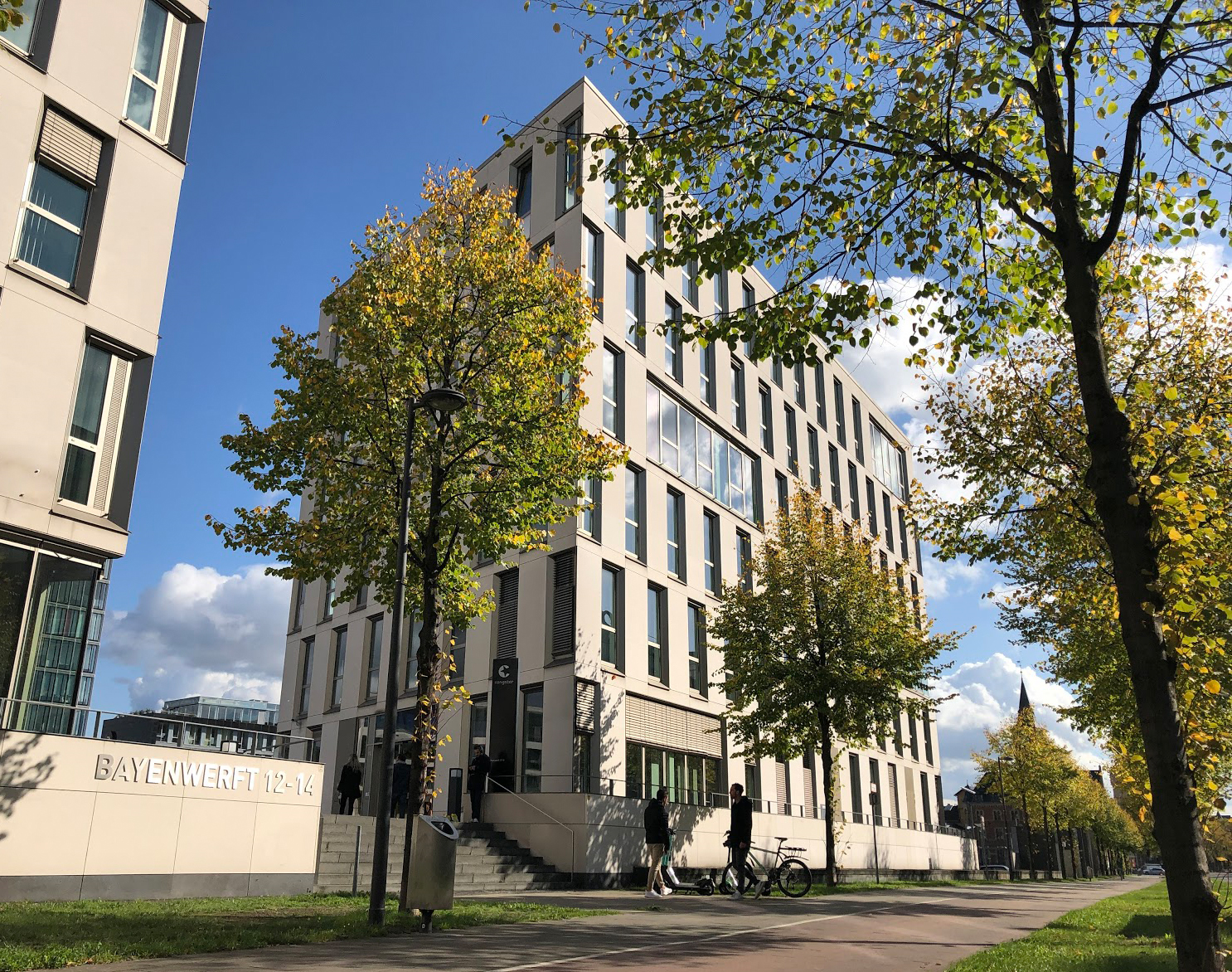
- Headquarters in Cologne, Germany
- Industry: Telecommunications
- Founded: November 11, 2004; 21 years ago in Darmstadt, Germany
- Headquarters: Germany
- Revenue: 1.00 billion EUR (2024)
- Number of employees: <250
- Website: https://congstar.de

Congstar GmbH is a mobile network operator headquartered in Cologne, Germany.

The company is a subsidiary of Telekom Deutschland, and specializes in discount mobile phone service marketed to younger people.

In August 2014, Congstar's services had approximately 3.4 million users.

In December 2019 the brand had over five million customers.

== See also ==
- List of mobile network operators of Europe
- Telekom Deutschland
