= Ben NL =

Dutch virtual mobile network

Ben
- Type: Subsidiary
- Industry: Wireless Services
- Founded: 1999; 27 years ago
- Products: GSM, GPRS, EDGE, UMTS (HSDPA), WLAN Hotspots(WiFi), T-Mobile HotSpot @Home
- Parent: Odido
- Website: www.ben.nl

Ben NL or Ben is a Dutch virtual mobile network operated by Odido. It offers voice, text and data service at highly discounted rates. Ben only offers 3 subscription types ranging in price from €4,95 for 100 minutes/text messages per month to €14,95 for 500 minutes/text messages per month.

In order to keep its prices down, Ben has a very limited customer service offering; a Ben subscription can only be purchased online and most customer administration is in the form of online self-service.

Ben offers its voice, text and data services on the GSM, GPRS, EDGE and UMTS (HSDPA) networks of its parent company T-Mobile Netherlands.

== History ==
On August 28, 2000, Belgacom, T-Mobile International, and Tele Danmark applied for permission to share control of Ben Nederland Holding (“Ben”). At that time, Belgacom was the principal telecommunications provider in Belgium, Tele Danmark the principal telecommunications provider in Denmark, and T-Mobile International a mobile telephony service provider and subsidiary of Deutsche Telekom. Ben was to become a “full function joint venture” and function as an independent company.

Ben emerged on the Dutch mobile market at a time when mobile phones were still a status symbol and were primarily used by business people. Ben expressly targeted a younger group of users with its trendy, minimalistic advertising using word-play with its name. "Ben" is a common first name in the Netherlands and also, in Dutch, roughly translates into "I am". Examples of this are the slogans "Ik ben Ben" (I am Ben) and "Ben Bereikbaar" (I'm available/reachable).

The initial launch of Ben was marked with a 3-minute television ad shown simultaneously on all major TV stations in the Netherlands. The company launched several viral advertising campaigns in clothing stores, clubs, bars, movie theaters and other places where a primarily younger audience could be targeted. Many cafés and cinemas in the Netherlands still sport the "Ben even uit" stickers on their doors, which means about the same as "I've just gone out for a bit" or "I've just (been) turned off for a while", asking customers to turn off their phones before entering.

Overall marketing for Ben in the Netherlands was considered by most to be trendy and artistic. The premieres of new Ben television ads were usually announced weeks in advance and watched with great anticipation.

On September 20, 2002, Ben was purchased by T-Mobile Netherlands, a 100% subsidiary of T-Mobile International. By 2003, T-Mobile had completed a worldwide rebranding of all its mobile telecommunications assets, and the name Ben was changed to T-Mobile Netherlands.

The name and trademark Ben vanished until 2008 when T-Mobile relaunched the brand as a virtual mobile network. The brand is intended to be a discount outlet for T-Mobile's networks in the Netherlands.

In keeping with tradition, the relaunch of Ben was heralded by a 3-minute, artistically designed television ad shown on all public TV stations in the Netherlands. Social networks like Hyves and websites such as YouTube were also used to promote the brand to a younger target group.
