= Deutsche Telekom MMS =

German IT service provider

Deutsche Telekom MMS GmbH
- Company type: Subsidiary
- Industry: IT services; IT consulting
- Founded: 1995; 31 years ago
- Headquarters: Dresden, Saxony, Germany
- Area served: Worldwide
- Key people: Ralf Pechmann (CEO), Marcus Gaube (CEO)
- Services: IT services
- Revenue: € 176 million (2019)
- Number of employees: 2100 (2019)
- Parent: T-Systems, Deutsche Telekom
- Website: www.telekom-mms.com

Deutsche Telekom MMS GmbH (Telekom MMS; former T-Systems Multimedia Solutions GmbH (T-Systems MMS)) is a German IT service and IT consulting firm headquartered in Dresden. The company provides consulting and software development services to medium and large organizations and has offices in Berlin, Bonn, Dresden, Hamburg, Stuttgart, Munich, Leipzig and Jena. In 2017, T-Systems MMS had 1900 employees and revenue of 173 Million EUR.

Telekom MMS is a wholly owned subsidiary of Deutsche Telekom Concern.

== History ==
The organization was founded in 1995 under the name “Multimedia Software GmbH Dresden” as a wholly owned subsidiary of Deutsche Telekom. The purpose of the company was to develop software for interactive television. Starting with CD-ROMs and interactive kiosks, the company later developed Internet and e-commerce software products.

Today, T-Systems MMS provides software for clients from different sectors such as digital commerce, websites, intranet, social marketing, big data, mobile, retail, security and Industry 4.0. The services provided by T-Systems MMS range from consulting and project management to software development and technical support services. In 2022 T-Systems Multimedia Solutions provides the Ethereum Network with infrastructure in the form of validation nodes.

In March 2023, the company went back to Deutsche Telekom AG and now operates under the name Deutsche Telekom MMS GmbH.

== Executive board ==
Telekom MMS has two managing directors: Ralf Pechmann who is responsible for marketing and clients, and Marcus Gaube as head of sales.

Former managing directors:

- Friedhelm Theis (1995–1998)
- Joachim Niemeier (1995–2005)
- Klaus Radermacher (1999–2002 and 2005–2007)
- Jens Nebendahl (2007–2013)
- Helmut Binder (2007–2008)
- Rolf Werner (2013–2015)
- Peter Klingenburg (2006–2018)
- Susanne Heger (2013–2019)
- Sven Erdmann (2019-2020)
