= Wilhelm.tel =

- Company type: Gmbh
- Industry: Telecommunications
- Founded: 1999
- Headquarters: Norderstedt
- Key people: Jens Seedorff, Theo Weirich
- Revenue: € 50,5 million (2014)
- Owner: Stadtwerke Norderstedt
- Website: www.wilhelm-tel.de

Wilhelm.tel GmbH is a German regional provider of telecommunication services based in Norderstedt. The company is 100% owned by the city of Norderstedt through its municipal services, Stadtwerke Norderstedt.

Wilhelm.tel operates its own fiber-optic network, which is laid to the individual households independent on the leasing of lines of Deutsche Telekom AG. The network offers cable television as well as a telephone connection with Internet access with data rates of up to 1 Gbit/s downstream or 250 Mbit/s upstream (private customer offers). The purchase of the cable television signal is a prerequisite for the use of the telephone and Internet offers.

In the city of Norderstedt, currently 95% of households are connected directly to the grid via their own lines. There, 28,000 out of a total of 33,000 households are customers of the company. After starting in 2004, some areas in Hamburg and Henstedt-Ulzburg were expanded. The development of other areas in the Norderstedt area is currently being planned, including a major expansion into Henstedt-Ulzburg, Kaltenkirchen and Rellingen. Throughout, the concept of direct access with fiber optic cables is intended to be implemented right down to the customer's basement ("Fiber To The Basement"). In total, wilhelm.tel had 75,000 customers in 2006 and achieved a profit of €2.8 million with a turnover of €17.5 million. In contrast, considerable losses were incurred in the initial phase, for example in 2002 at the rate of €3.5 million. In total, losses between 1999 and 2002 were €10 million. The losses, as well as the costs for the construction of the fiber optic network in the amount of €43 million were carried by the Stadtwerke.

Wilhelm.tel was the first company in Germany to offer a complete multimedia package (triple-play). These included the telephony, fast Internet connection, and cable TV (including the reception of a local television station).

Digital cable TV is not basic encrypted except for pay-TV programs, so it can be received by any DVB-C enabled device.

Wilhelm.tel is a cooperation partner of other regional cable network operators in southern Schleswig-Holstein, for example Ell-tel (Ellerau), GWHtel (Halstenbek), pinnau.com (Pinneberg), SWN (Neumünster), tel.quick (Quickborn), and willy.tel in Hamburg. VSE NET in Saarland and Stadtwerke Buchholz in der Nordheide will also be supplied with the digital TV signal.

Wilhelm.tel has been an official partner of the housing company SAGA Unternehmensgruppe since October 2008 in terms of telephony/internet/cable television. Since the summer of 2009, almost all apartments are connected to the fiber-optic network. This enabled wilhelm.tel to expand its availability range enormously, as the SAGA-GWG is the largest housing company in Hamburg.

The company is a member of the ANGA Association of German Cable Network Operators, organized in the Federal Association of Fiber Optic Access (Buglas), as well as in the German Network Marketing GmbH (DNMG).

Since June 2013, wilhelm.tel also offers services in Wedel, Wacken, Tangstedt (Stormarn), Tangstedt (Pinneberg), Alveslohe, Kayhude and Itzehoe. Since autumn 2013, a free Wi-Fi network has been installed in the main distribution area of Norderstedt and customer centers in Hamburg, and provided without time and data limitation. This network will soon be expanded throughout the area. Access can be temporary or permanent.
