= Deutsche Telekom eavesdropping controversy =

German controversy

The Deutsche Telekom eavesdropping controversy became public at the end of May 2008 through an article in the German weekly Der Spiegel. The prosecutor in Bonn has initiated investigations against eight former members of Deutsche Telekom's advisory board, executive board and former employees. The investigation focuses on alleged eavesdropping against journalists and members of the supervisory executive boards of Deutsche Telekom, allegedly initiated by then chairman of the supervisory board Klaus Zumwinkel and then CEO Kai-Uwe Ricke. The objective of the eavesdropping was to find out who had leaked confidential information about planned lay-offs and acquisitions to the media in 2005 and 2006. According to German law half the members of the advisory board of large publicly listed companies have to be representatives of the employees. These were apparently suspected of having leaked the information.

René Obermann, CEO of Deutsche Telekom, cooperated with the public prosecutor, handing over relevant information and allowing his offices to be searched. Moreover, Obermann called on the prestigious former federal judge Dr. Gerhard Schäfer to assist Deutsche Telekom in handling the scandal.

A member of the German Bundestag compared the possible impact of the scandal in Germany to the Spiegel affair of 1962. On 24 October 2008, the Big Brother Award 2008 in the category Workplace and Communications was awarded to Telekom for the scandal.
