= Channel spacing =

Channel spacing, also known as bandwidth, is a term used in radio frequency planning. It describes the frequency difference between adjacent allocations in a frequency plan. Channels for mediumwave radio stations, for example are allocated in internationally agreed steps of 9 or 10 kHz: 10 kHz in ITU Region 2 (the Americas), and 9 kHz elsewhere in the world.
