= T-Mobile Czech Republic =

Company in the Czech Republic

T-Mobile Czech Republic, a.s.
- Type: Subsidiary
- Industry: Telecommunication
- Founded: 1996; 30 years ago in Prague, Czech Republic
- Headquarters: Prague, Czech Republic
- Key people: Melinda Szabó (CEO)
- Revenue: 31,858,000,000 Czech koruna (2025)
- Operating income: 8,045,000,000 Czech koruna (2021)
- Net income: 6,853,000,000 Czech koruna (2025)
- Total assets: 48,773,000,000 Czech koruna (2021)
- Number of employees: 3,084 (2025)
- Parent: Deutsche Telekom
- Website: www.t-mobile.cz

T-Mobile Czech Republic a.s. is a Czech telecommunications company and mobile network operator that is part of the German Deutsche Telekom group. With more than 6.5 million customers in 2025, it was the largest mobile operator in the Czech Republic by number of customers.

The company traces its origins to RadioMobil, which launched the Paegas mobile network in 1996.

== History ==
T-Mobile Czech Republic was founded in 1996 as RadioMobil. The company launched its mobile network under the Paegas brand later that year.

Paegas was replaced by the T-Mobile brand in 2002, and RadioMobil was renamed T-Mobile Czech Republic in 2003. Two years later, T-Mobile became the first Czech operator to launch a commercial 3G network.

The company continued expanding during the 2010s. It began sharing parts of its mobile network with O2 Czech Republic and launched commercial LTE services in 2013. The same year, T-Mobile acquired T-Systems Czech Republic, expanding its fixed-network and business IT services.

In 2014, Deutsche Telekom acquired the remaining shares in T-Mobile Czech Republic for €800 million, making it a wholly owned subsidiary.

T-Mobile launched its Czech 5G network in 2020. Its older 3G network was shut down the following year as spectrum was moved to newer technologies.

== See also ==
- List of mobile network operators in Europe
