= Tele2 Netherlands =

Netherlands-based elecommunications company

- Industry: Mobile telecommunications
- Founded: 1997
- Successor: Odido
- Headquarters: Diemen, Netherlands
- Products: Mobile networks
- Owner: T-Mobile Netherlands
- Website: www.tele2.nl

Tele2 Netherlands (formerly Versatel Telecom International N.V) was a brand name of telecommunications company T-Mobile Netherlands, operating on the Dutch and Belgian market. It sells fixed telephony, mobile telephony, broadband internet and digital TV products. On 5 September 2023, both the T-Mobile and Tele2 were rebranded altogether under one brand as Odido.

== History ==
Tele2 was founded as a European company in 1993 to offer telecom services to both domestic and business customers. In 1997, Tele2 Netherlands introduced telecoms services to the Dutch market operating as an MVNO and competed with lower prices for mobile services. Tele2 Netherlands was launched in 1997 and was the first Dutch company to provide IP-VPN network services.

In July 2005, the Dutch portion of Versatel was sold to Tele2 for 1.1 billion euro. The European commission concluded that both Tele2 and Versatel lacked the marked power to foreclose competition and allowed the sale to close. The German part, Versatel Deutschland (now 1&1 Versatel GmbH), was sold to Apax Partners who merged it with Tropolys, another German telecommunications company. In 2006, the name Versatel was replaced by Tele2.

In 2009, Tele2 had nearly 400,000 subscribers.

In 2013, Tele2 had a market share in the Netherlands of 7%.

=== Acquisition by T-Mobile Netherlands ===
In December 2017, T-Mobile Netherlands announced its intent to buy Tele2 Netherlands from its Swedish parent Tele2 AB. After a delay because of a European Commission investigation, the merger was completed in January 2019. As part of the purchase, Tele2 AB acquired a 25% share in T-Mobile Netherlands.

On 7 January 2020, the legal entity Tele2 Netherlands Holding B.V. was merged into T-Mobile Netherlands, leaving Tele2 as a brand name of T-Mobile.
