= QSC AG =

German telecom company

q.beyond AG
- Company type: Aktiengesellschaft
- Traded as: FWB: QBY
- Industry: Telecommunications
- Founded: 1997
- Headquarters: Cologne, Germany
- Key people: Bernd Schlobohm (CEO and chairman of the management board), Herbert Brenke (Chairman of the supervisory board)
- Products: Residential and wholesale broadband Internet and telephony services
- Revenue: €422.1 million (2010)
- Operating income: €20.9 million (2010)
- Net income: €24.2 million (2010)
- Total assets: €332.2 million (end 2010)
- Total equity: €184.0 million (end 2010)
- Number of employees: 610 (end 2010)
- Website: www.qbeyond.de

QSC AG was founded in Cologne on 5 August 1999 by Bernd Schlobom and Gerd Eickers as the first German and one of the first European HDSL internet service provider. The company went public on 19 April 2000 in Frankfurt Stock Exchange (at the Neuer Market).

Cologne-based QSC AG was a nationwide telecommunications provider in Germany with its own DSL network. It supplied broadband communication products such as leased lines. It was a member of the TecDAX 30, Germany's 30 leading public technology companies.

Today the company operates under the name q.beyond AG and offers mainly IT-Consulting services.
