= Deutsche Telekom =

German telecommunications company

Deutsche Telekom AG
- Official logo since 2022

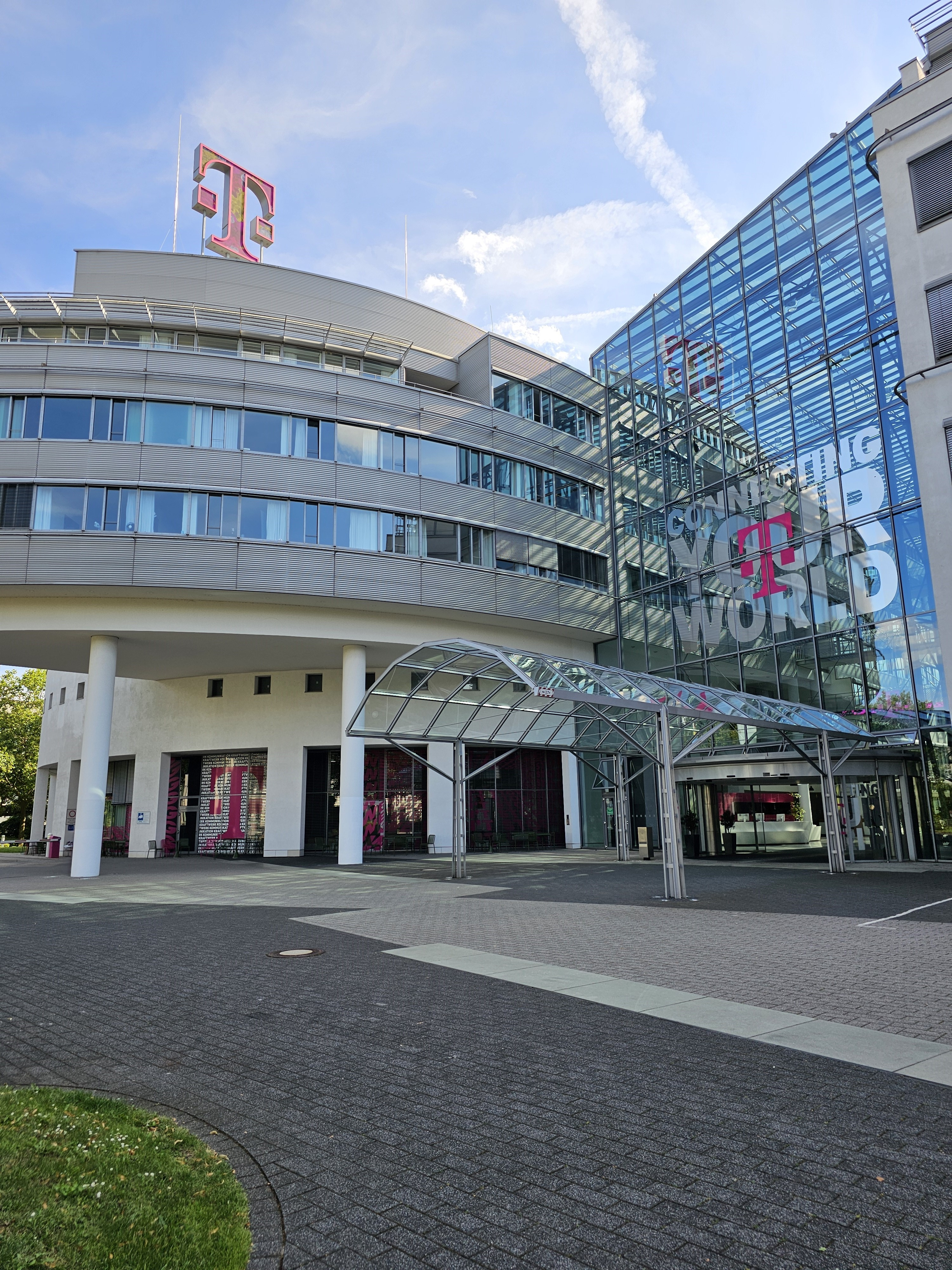
- Deutsche Telekom's Headquarters in Bonn, Germany
- Trade name: Telekom
- Type: Public
- Traded as: FWB: DTE; DAX component
- ISIN: DE0005557508
- Industry: Telecommunications
- Predecessor: Deutsche Bundespost
- Founded: 1 January 1995; 31 years ago
- Headquarters: Bonn, Germany
- Area served: Worldwide; mainly Germany and the US
- Key people: Timotheus Höttges (CEO); Frank Appel (chairman of the supervisory board)
- Products: Fixed-line; Mobile telephony; Broadband; Digital television; Digital media; IT services
- Brands: T-Mobile
- Revenue: ▲€119.1 billion (2025)
- Operating income: ▼€24.8 billion (2025)
- Net income: ▼€3.2 billion (2025)
- Total assets: ▼€289.8 billion (2025)
- Total equity: ▼€92.2 billion (2025)
- Owner: Federal Republic of Germany (31.9%); Public float (68.1%)
- Number of employees: 199,000 (2025)
- Subsidiaries: List: T-Systems International GmbH; Telekom Deutschland GmbH; T-Mobile US (51.4%); Magenta Telekom; T-Mobile Polska; T-Mobile Czech Republic; Slovak Telekom; Magyar Telekom (59%); Hrvatski Telekom (53.5%); OTE (53.45%); Makedonski Telekom; Crnogorski Telekom
- ASN: 3320
- Traffic Levels: 50+ terabits
- Website: www.telekom.com

Deutsche Telekom AG (German pronunciation: [ˌdɔʏtʃə ˈteːləkɔm ʔaːˌɡeː], lit. 'German Telecom'; often just Telekom) is a partially state-owned German telecommunications company headquartered in Bonn. It operates several subsidiaries worldwide, including the mobile communications brand T-Mobile.

It was formed in 1995 when Deutsche Bundespost, a state monopoly at the time, was restructured. As of April 2020, the German government held a direct 14.5% stake in company stock and another 17.4% through the government bank KfW. On 4 June 2024, the German government reduced its total shareholding to 27.8%. (Note: 13.83% directly and 13.97% through KfW)

Deutsche Telekom is a component of the DAX and the EURO STOXX 50 stock market indices. It has consistently featured among Fortune Magazine's top Global 500 companies by revenue, with its ranking as of 2023 at number 79. In 2023, the company was ranked 41st in the Forbes Global 2000. It is the world's third-largest telecommunications company by revenue and the largest from Europe.

== History ==
The Deutsche Bundespost was the German federal government postal administration created in 1947 as a successor to the Reichspost. It was also the major telephone company in West Germany.

On 1 July 1989, as part of a post office reform, Deutsche Bundespost was split into three entities, one being Deutsche Telekom. On 1 January 1995, as part of another reform, Deutsche Bundespost Telekom became Deutsche Telekom AG, and was privatized in 1996. As such, it shares a common heritage with the other privatized Deutsche Bundespost companies, Deutsche Post (DHL) and Deutsche Postbank.

Deutsche Telekom was the monopoly Internet service provider (ISP) for Germany until its privatization in 1995, and the dominant ISP thereafter. Until the early 21st century, Deutsche Telekom controlled almost all Internet access by individuals and small businesses in Germany, as it was one of the first German telecom units.

On 6 December 2001, Deutsche Telekom became the first official partner of the 2006 FIFA World Cup. On 1 January 2005, Deutsche Telekom implemented a new company structure. The two organizational business units of T-Com and T-Online were merged into the Broadband/Fixed Network (BBFN) strategic business unit (T-Online merged with parent Deutsche Telekom in 2006). It provides around 40 million narrowband lines, over 9 million broadband lines, and has 14 million registered Internet customers.

In 2008, the structure was changed again. T-Online was separated from Deutsche Telekom and merged with T-Com to form the new unit T-Home. In September 2010, Orange parent France Télécom and T-Mobile parent Deutsche Telekom merged their operations in the United Kingdom to create the largest mobile network in Britain, EE.

In April 2010, T-Mobile was merged with T-Home to form Telekom Deutschland GmbH. This unit now handles all products and services aimed at private customers. In October 2012, Deutsche Telekom and Orange created a 50-50% joint venture named BuyIn for regrouping their procurement operations and benefiting from economies of scale.

Previous logo (2013–2022)

In April 2013, T-Mobile US and MetroPCS merged their operations in the United States. In February 2014, Deutsche Telekom acquired the remaining parts of its T-Mobile Czech Republic division for around €800 million. The size of the remaining stake was numbered at 40 percent.

In December 2014, it was announced that Deutsche Telekom were in talks with BT Group on the acquisition of EE, and part of the deal was to provide Deutsche Telekom a 12% stake and a seat on the board in the BT Group upon completion. BT Group announced agreement in February 2015 to acquire EE for £12.5 billion and received regulatory approval from the Competition and Markets Authority on 15 January 2016. The transaction was completed on 29 January 2016.

In September 2015, Deutsche Telekom launched the "Puls tablet", a Tablet computer with Android version 5. In February 2016, at the Mobile World Congress, in Barcelona, Deutsche Telekom jointly launched the Telecom Infra Project (TIP) with Intel, Nokia, Facebook, Equinix, SK Telecom, and others, which builds on the Open Compute Project model to accelerate innovation in the telecom industry. Amid concerns over Chinese involvement in 5G wireless networks in Europe, Deutsche Telekom temporarily put all deals to buy 5G network equipment on hold in 2019, as it awaited the resolution of a debate in Germany over whether to ban Chinese vendor Huawei on security grounds.

In February 2020, Deutsche Telekom joined a new partnership called HAPS Alliance to promote the use of high-altitude vehicles in the Earth's stratosphere with the goal of eliminating the digital divide. On April 1, 2020, Sprint completed the merger with T-Mobile US, making T-Mobile US the owner of Sprint and becoming its subsidiary until the Sprint brand is phased out. The merger also led SoftBank Group, the then-owner of Sprint, to hold up to 24% of New T-Mobile's shares while Deutsche Telekom holds up to 43% of its shares. The remaining 33% is since held by public shareholders.

In September 2021, Deutsche Telekom sold T-Mobile Netherlands for €5.1 billion to the investment companies Apax Partners and Warburg Pincus. In September 2022, Deutsche Telekom started expanding its activities in the field of blockchain technology. DT's subsidiary, Deutsche Telekom MMS provides the Ethereum Network with infrastructure in the form of validation nodes.

In December 2023, Deutsche Telekom and Nokia with Fujitsu began deploying a multivendor Open Radio Access Network (Open RAN). The network is fully integrated into Deutsche Telekom's existing commercial network, including 5G AirScale compatible with Open RAN.

In July 2025, a partnership between Deutsche Telekom and Nvidia was announced to jointly develop industrial AI cloud infrastructure. This collaboration also includes the construction of a data center in Munich, with an investment volume estimated at one billion euros.

In April 2026, Deutsche Telekom explored a potential merger with its majority-owned subsidiary T-Mobile US in a deal that could create one of the world's largest telecommunications companies, subject to regulatory approvals and shareholder approval. This deal would result in Deutsche Telekom owning the entirety of T-Mobile US for the first time since the 2013 MetroPCS merger.

== Finances ==
For the fiscal year 2017, Deutsche Telekom reported earnings of €3.5 billion, with an annual revenue of €74.9 billion, an increase of 2.5% over the previous fiscal cycle. Deutsche Telekom's shares traded at over €14 per share, and its market capitalization was valued at US$68.4 billion in November 2018.

For the fiscal year 2025, Deutsche Telekom reported a net profit of €17.8 billion, with an annual revenue of €114.4 billion, representing a significant long-term growth compared to previous years. By May 2026, Deutsche Telekom's shares traded at over €27 per share, with its market capitalization reaching approximately €140 billion.

The key trends for Deutsche Telekom are (as at the financial year ending December 31):

Year	Revenue (€ bn)	Net income (€ bn)	Total assets (€ bn)	Employees
2011	58.6	0.55	122	240,369
2012	58.1	−5.2	107	232,342
2013	60.1	0.93	118	230,000
2014	62.6	2.9	129	228,248
2015	69.2	3.2	143	266,232
2016	73.0	2.6	148	221,000
2017	74.9	3.4	141	216,000
2018	75.6	2.1	145	216,369
2019	80.5	3.8	170	212,846
2020	100	4.1	264	226,291
2021	108	4.1	281	216,528
2022	114	8.0	298	206,759
2023	111	17.7	290	199,652
2024	115	11.2	304	198,194
2025	119	3.2	290	199,999

== Operations ==
Map of countries where Telekom offers carrier services as of 2025 Operating as T-Mobile or Telekom As HT Eronet Formerly as Cosmote, now Telekom Former markets

Deutsche Telekom also holds substantial shares in other telecom companies, including Central European subsidiaries Slovak Telekom (Slovakia) and Magyar Telekom (Hungary). Furthermore, Magyar Telekom holds majority shares in Makedonski Telekom (North Macedonia), and Hrvatski Telekom (Croatia) holds majority shares in Crnogorski Telekom (Montenegro). It also has significant shares in HT Mostar (Bosnia and Herzegovina).

DT also holds shares in the Hellenic telecommunication operator OTE, which also have shares in several other companies and the IT&C retailer Germanos. Deutsche Telekom also operates a wholesale division named International Carrier Sales & Solutions (ICSS) that provides white label voice and data wholesale support services to large carriers. OTE also used to have shares in One Telecommunications operating in Albania. Prior to its sale it was known as Telekom Albania using DT's logo and marketing strategies.

Operation of telephone companies involves billing-software or "BSS". Deutsche Telekom's T-Mobile billing was performed on Israeli-backend systems until 2014, when Ericsson was selected to replace the Israeli backend.

Subsidiaries and affiliates
Country	Company	Stake held by Deutsche Telekom
Austria	Magenta Telekom	100%
Bosnia and Herzegovina	HT Eronet (JP Hrvatske telekomunikacije d.d. Mostar)	39.9% of shares held by Hrvatski Telekom
Croatia	Hrvatski Telekom d.d.	53.8%
Czech Republic	T-Mobile Czech Republic, a.s.	100%
Germany	Telekom Deutschland GmbH	100%
Greece	Hellenic Telekom (Hellenic Telecommunications Organization S.A.)	55.6%
Hungary	Magyar Telekom Nyrt.	67.1%
Montenegro	Crnogorski Telekom A.D.	76.53% of shares held by Hrvatski Telekom
North Macedonia	Makedonski Telekom AD	51% of shares held by Magyar Telekom
Poland	T-Mobile Polska S.A.	100%
Slovakia	Slovak Telekom, a.s.	100%
United States	T-Mobile US, Inc.	50.2%

=== T-Systems ===
Deutsche Telekom world locations as of March 2022

T-Systems sells worldwide products and services to medium to very large business customers. The focus is on the marketing of complex services and industry solutions.

=== Deutsche Telekom Global Carrier ===
Deutsche Telekom Global Carrier was formerly known as Deutsche Telekom International Sales and Solutions. It is an international wholesale arm of Deutsche Telekom. The products include Voice Termination, Ethernet, IP-Transit, Mobile and Roaming as well as In-flight Internet Access for the aviation industry. It operates a Tier-1 network.

=== European Aviation Network ===
Together with Inmarsat and Nokia, Deutsche Telekom develops a hybrid network for faster internet access onboard planes in Europe. It is a combination of data transmission via Inmarsat Satellites and Deutsche Telekom's LTE ground stations throughout the European continent.

== See also ==
- List of mobile network operators
- List of telecommunications regulatory bodies
- Deutsche Telekom eavesdropping controversy
