= Kazuo Hashimoto =

- 橋本和芙
- Known for: patent inventions telephony
- Notable work: Caller Identification, answering machine

Kazuo Hashimoto (橋本 和芙, Hashimoto Kazuo; died August 1995) was a Japanese inventor who registered over 1,000 patents throughout the world, including patents for a Caller-ID system and telephone answering machines. He filed for his first telephone answering machine patent, what would become the Ansa Fone, in Japan in 1958, followed by the United States in 1963, granted in the United States in 1968. Bell's monopoly over telephony in the United States combined with the recent Hush-A-Phone and Carterfone decisions required that all telephone answering machines be connected through strictly mechanical means. This is evidenced through the mechanical arms used to pick up the telephone handset and the lack of any electrical connections with the telephone device itself. He patented Caller-ID in Japan in 1976, and received a United States patent in 1980. In 1983 he invented a digital telephone answering device.

He was a recipient of Japan's Medal of Honour, the Yellow Ribbon, and was designated as a Living National Treasure.

Hashimoto was awarded an honorary Doctor of Science degree ('honoris causa') by New Jersey Institute of Technology in 1994 for his outstanding contributions to the field of telephony.
