= Receiving party pays =

Receiving Party Pays is a payment model set basically in the cellular market, that states that the payment for an incoming call is set on the receiver. That model differs from "Calling party pays" in which the caller is the one who pays for the other side receiving it.

The total cost of each call placed by a subscriber of a Mobile Network Operator (MNO) is split in two parts. The first part is the amount that the caller's provider is charging in order to provide the service to the calling party. The second part is the mobile termination rates (MTRs) that the provider of the call-receiver demands to deliver a call. Concerning the MTRs, in some parts of North America and Asia the Receiving party pays (RPP) instead of the Calling party pays (CPP) principle is applied. In contrast to the CPP principle, in RPP the callee is asked to pay for the termination cost or in some cases to share a part of this cost with the caller. Initially this approach sounds fair, especially in the scope of the callee payment for the call receiving service, while he is mobile and not located in his home network. Furthermore, a subscriber is free to compare termination rates of each MNO and to make his choice before the establishment of a contract with a MNO. Thereby, the mobile termination rates market seems to allow for competition.

However, the question of how a called party could avoid paying for unwanted calls (e.g., advertisements, tele-sales, or polls) is raised. The answer is that it is the callee's responsibility to distinguish which calls are important and should be accepted and which should be rejected. This is only one of the RPP side effects that feared to slow-down the mobile sector in the past. The RPP principle may add an extra degree of freedom in the mobile call charges, since the termination rate is not a part of the total cost that the caller has to pay. However, it is also adding a considerably big overhead for consumers such as the provider selection decision, while considering the callee role.

== List of receiving party pays countries ==
- USA
- Canada
- Hong Kong
- Singapore

== See also ==
- Bill and keep
