= Amtelco =

- Type: Privately Held
- Founded: 1976
- Headquarters: McFarland, WI,
- Website: www.amtelco.com

Amtelco is a manufacturer of telecommunications equipment and telephone answering service and call center systems, founded in 1976.

== History ==
Amtelco was founded in 1976 by Bill Curtin in the wake of the 1968 U.S. Federal Communications Commission (FCC) ruling in the Carterphone case, which struck down existing tariffs prohibiting connection to the public telephone network of equipment not supplied by telephone operating companies.

Following the release of its TAS (Telephone Answering Service) Video system, Amtelco became a common name in the telecommunications service industry, its product being one of the first computerized telephone switching system, following the 1ESS switch and one designed by the British GPO Post Office Research Station in the late 1960s and now in the Science Museum in London.

The TAS system soon was succeeded by the EVE system; more powerful and taking advantage of early-model PCs and dumb terminals. By the late 1980s, AMTELCO's EVE (Electronic Video Exchange) system grew to become the most widely used business telephone answering equipment in the industry. Today, Infinity has replaced EVE as the flagship Telephone switching system.

In February 2026, Amtelco announced the release of Ellie, an artificial intelligence–based intelligent virtual agent designed for contact centers. The software uses large language models and natural language processing to automate caller interactions and to process call-handling scripts used by human operators. Ellie was developed to operate with version 6.0 of Amtelco’s Intelligent Series software, with cloud-based language-model functions provided through the company’s Active Insights platform. Its functions include automated call handling, real-time transcription, text-to-speech, language translation, and call transfer between automated and human agents. The product was named after Amtelco co-founder Eleanor “Ellie” Curtin.

50th Anniversary

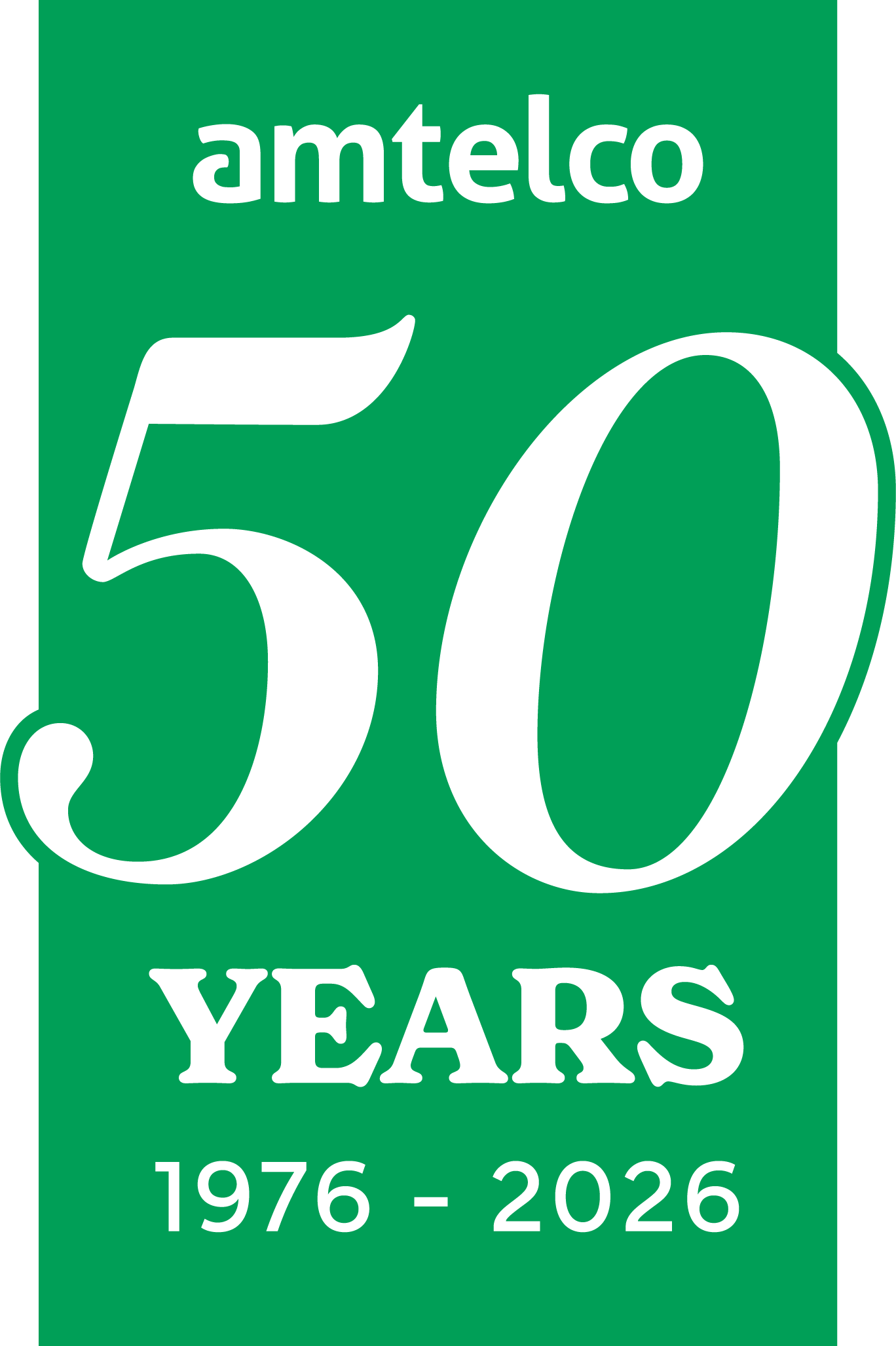

In 2026, Amtelco marked the 50th anniversary of its founding. The company was established in 1976 by Bill Curtin II and Eleanor Curtin in Wisconsin. Its year-long anniversary observance included historical retrospectives, a commemorative logo, customer and employee events, and appearances at industry conferences. The anniversary also coincided with the release of version 6.0 of Amtelco’s Intelligent Series communications platform and the formal launch of Ellie, the company’s artificial intelligence-based intelligent virtual agent.

== History of Amtelco in Healthcare ==
In 1997, Amtelco launched a dedicated healthcare division (formerly branded as “1Call”) aimed at addressing the specialized communications and call-center needs of hospitals and other healthcare providers.

Over the years the company developed and enhanced solutions tailored to medical settings—including on-call scheduling, hospital messaging, secure mobile/desktop apps, operator consoles and automated voice services—all with a focus on HIPAA-compliant, mission-critical workflows.

By combining longstanding telecommunications expertise with healthcare-specific workflows, Amtelco established itself as a vendor serving hundreds of hospitals and healthcare contact centers across the U.S. and Canada.

Today, Amtelco’s Healthcare division claims to emphasize cloud contact-center architecture, secure messaging for clinicians and staff, emergency notifications, and integration with hospital systems—intending to position itself as a partner in improving patient-access, on-call efficiency and emergency communications in clinical settings.
