= Leo Beranek =

American acoustician (1914–2016)

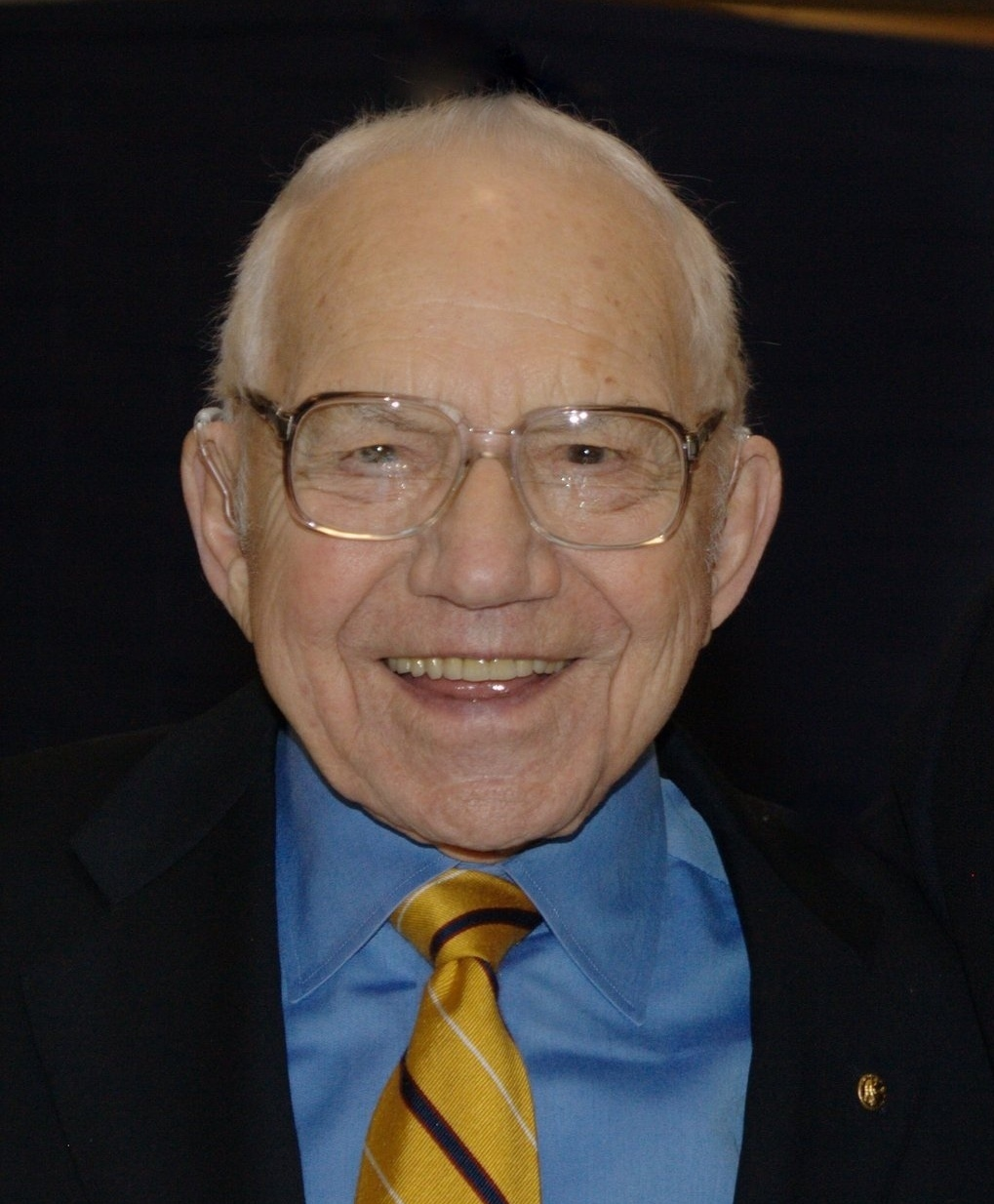
- Leo Beranek, 2011
- Born: Leo Leroy Beranek; September 15, 1914; Solon, Iowa, US
- Died: October 10, 2016 (aged 102); Westwood, Massachusetts, US
- Education: Cornell College (Mount Vernon, Iowa); Harvard University
- Known for: Acoustics (1954, 1986); Acoustics: Sound Fields and Transducers (2012); Music, Acoustics, and Architecture (1962, 2004)
- Awards: Wallace Clement Sabine Medal (1961); Audio Engineering Society Gold Medal Award (1971); ASA Gold Medal (1975); National Medal of Science in Engineering (2002) Technical Grammy Special Merit Award (2025)
- Scientific career
- Fields: Acoustics; Electrical engineering
- Workplaces: Bolt, Beranek and Newman; Massachusetts Institute of Technology (MIT)
- Doctoral advisor: Frederick Vinton Hunt
- Doctoral students: Kenneth N. Stevens; James L. Flanagan

Leo Leroy Beranek (September 15, 1914 – October 10, 2016) was an American acoustician, former MIT professor, and a founder and former president of Bolt, Beranek and Newman (now BBN Technologies). He authored Acoustics, considered a classic textbook in this field, and its updated and extended version published in 2012 under the title Acoustics: Sound Fields and Transducers. He was also an expert in the design and evaluation of concert halls and opera houses, and authored the classic textbook Music, Acoustics, and Architecture, revised and extended in 2004 under the title Concert Halls and Opera Houses: Music, Acoustics, and Architecture.

== Early life and education ==
Beranek was born in 1914, in Solon, Iowa. His father Edward Fred Beranek was a farmer whose ancestors came from Bohemia (in what is now the Czech Republic) and his mother Beatrice Stahle, previously a schoolteacher, had become a farmwife. Edward's paternal grandparents Josef Beránek and Anna Šimandlová were from Nynice and Jarov respectively.

Beranek first started school in a one-room schoolhouse in Tipton, Iowa. After his first year, he rode in a horse-drawn school bus on a two-hour trip to a somewhat larger school. In 1922 his family moved back to Solon, where he was soon skipped over third grade and moved directly into fourth grade classes. Around that time, a baby brother was born, named Lyle Edward Beranek.

In 1924, Beranek's father brought home a battery-powered radio containing a single vacuum tube. His eldest son became fascinated with both the technology and the musical aspects of radio. In the harsh winter of January 1926, Beranek's mother died suddenly, leaving his father with huge debts and forcing his father to sell the farm within two months. In junior high school Beranek earned his first independent money by selling silk stockings and fabric. Beranek's father remarried and moved the family to the nearby town of Mount Vernon, Iowa, where he became co-owner of a hardware store. At his father's suggestion, Beranek learned radio repair via a correspondence course, and apprenticed to an older repairman. The younger Beranek quickly learned the trade, and was soon able to buy a Model T automobile. He also earned some spare cash by playing trap drums in a 6-person dance band. He continued to excel in his studies, including a typing class (rarely studied by boys) where he was the top performer.

Beranek applied for and was accepted at nearby Cornell College in Mount Vernon, Iowa. In the aftermath of the Wall Street Crash of 1929, money was tight, but he had managed to save $500. Worried about the shaky financial situation, he went to his bank and managed to withdraw $400 to pay his college tuition in advance. The bank failed the next day, and Beranek lost the remaining $100. During freshman year at college, Beranek was told by his father that he could not expect any family money and that he was on his own. In the summers of 1932 and 1933, Beranek worked as a field hand on local farms, to earn tuition money and to improve his physical condition. Beranek moved into two rooms above a bakery, shared with three other students to save money. He also continued to repair radios and played in a dance band, but falling income forced him to consider dropping down to a single class (in mathematics) during the next academic year.

In August 1933, Beranek was invited to accompany the family of a local dentist to the Century of Progress World's Fair in Chicago. This was his first trip to a big city and it was a revelation. He attended concert performances by the Chicago Symphony and Detroit Symphony daily, was dazzled by the displays of industrial products and technology, and fascinated by the international pavilions. He lived on a shoestring, spending a total of $12 for four days, but felt compelled to make a return trip the following summer.

In college, Beranek became friends with a fellow student who had an amateur radio setup, inspiring him to study Morse Code and to earn his own amateur radio license. In fall of 1933, he bought an early disc sound recorder to earn a modest fee by recording students before and after taking a speech training class. This was his first hands-on experience with the developing science of acoustics. By early 1934 he was forced to drop out of college and work full-time to earn more tuition money. He found a position at the fledgling Collins Radio Company of Cedar Rapids, Iowa, where he studied German in his spare time. While there, he also met and dated Florence "Floss" Martin, a business school student. He was able to save enough money to attend the Spring 1935 semester at Cornell College, then returned to Collins Radio for the summer.

In August 1935, Beranek had a chance encounter with a stranger whose car had developed a flat tire while passing through Mount Vernon. While helping the stranger (who turned out to be Glenn Browning), he learned that the passing motorist had written a technical paper on radio technology. When Beranek mentioned plans for graduate school, Browning encouraged him to apply to Harvard University, a possibility he had regarded as financially out of reach.

Beranek was very busy in his final year at Cornell, running a radio repair and sales business and then transitioning to house wiring for electricity, while carrying a full course load. He managed three major wiring jobs for Cornell, including designing and installing a master antenna system in a new men's dormitory then under construction. He also continued to date his girlfriend Floss. Beranek graduated from Cornell College in summer 1936 with a Bachelor of Arts. He continued studies at Harvard University, where he received a doctorate in 1940.

== Career ==
During World War II, Beranek managed Harvard's electro-acoustics laboratory, which designed communications and noise reduction systems for World War II aircraft, while at the same time developing other military technologies. During this time he built the first anechoic chamber, an extremely quiet room for studying noise effects which later would inspire John Cage's philosophy of silence.

In 1945, Beranek became involved with a small company called Hush-A-Phone, which marketed a cup that fit over the mouthpiece of a telephone receiver in order to prevent the person speaking from being overheard. Although Hush-A-Phone had been around since the 1920s, Beranek used his acoustical expertise to develop an improved version of the device. AT&T threatened Hush-A-Phone users with termination of their telephone service. At the time, AT&T maintained a monopoly on American telephone service and telephones were leased from AT&T, rather than owned by customers. The resulting legal case, Hush-A-Phone v. United States, resulted in a victory for Hush-A-Phone. In finding that AT&T did not have the right to restrict use of the Hush-A-Phone, the courts established a precedent that would eventually lead to the breakup of AT&T's monopoly.

Beranek joined the staff at the Massachusetts Institute of Technology as professor of communications engineering from 1947 to 1958. In 1948, he helped found Bolt, Beranek and Newman (BBN), serving as the company's president from 1952 to 1969. He continued to serve as chief scientist of BBN through 1971, as he led Boston Broadcasters, Inc. which (after a court battle) took control of television station WCVB-TV.

It has been remarked that if one selects his own components, builds his own enclosure, and is convinced he has made a wise choice of design, then his own loudspeaker sounds better to him than does anyone else's loudspeaker. In this case, the frequency response of the loudspeaker seems to play only a minor part in forming a person's opinion.

Beranek's 1954 book, Acoustics, is considered the classic textbook in this field; it was revised in 1986. In 2012, at the age of 98, he collaborated with Tim Mellow to produce an updated and extended revision, published under the new title Acoustics: Sound Fields and Transducers. His famous humorous adage was "Beranek's Law", about the psychological effect of somebody's own design in comparison to other designs.

Beranek's 1962 book, Music, Acoustics, and Architecture, developed from his analysis of 55 concert halls throughout the world, also became a classic; the 2004 edition of the text expanded the study to 100 halls. Beranek participated in the design of numerous concert halls and opera houses, and traveled worldwide to conduct research and enjoy musical performances.

From 1983 to 1986, Beranek was chairman of the board of the Boston Symphony Orchestra, where he remained a Life Trustee. The Beranek Room at the Symphony Hall is named after him. He also served on the MIT Council for the Arts, "an international volunteer group of alumni and friends established to support the arts at the Massachusetts Institute of Technology". In 2008 he published Riding the Waves : A Life in Sound, Science, and Industry, an autobiography about his lengthy career and research in sound and music. He turned 100 in September 2014, an occasion marked by a special celebration at Boston Symphony Hall. The Leo and Gabriella Beranek Scholarship in Architectural Acoustics and Noise Control was established in 2016 to support graduate study in the fields of architectural acoustics and noise control. Beranek died on October 10, 2016, at the age of 102. His last paper, "Concert hall acoustics: Recent findings", had been published earlier that year.

== Personal life and death ==
Beranek died in 2016 in Westwood, Massachusetts age 102.

== Awards and honors ==
- Fellow of the American Physical Society (1946)
- Fellow of the American Academy of Arts and Sciences (1952) In addition to being made a fellow of the American Academy of Arts, he also served as the president of the organization from 1989-1994
- Wallace Clement Sabine Medal of the Acoustical Society of America (1961) for internationally recognized achievements in all phases of architectural acoustics, and his publications on acoustical measurements, and the world's great concert halls.
- Gold Medal of the Audio Engineering Society (1971)
- Gold Medal from the Acoustical Society of America (1975) for leadership in developing, in the United States and abroad, the desire and the capability for achieving good acoustics in communications, workplaces, concert halls, and communities.
- National Medal of Science in Engineering (2002)
- IEEE Founders Medal (2013)
- Rayleigh Medal of the Institute of Acoustics, United Kingdom (2014)
- Technical Grammy Award (2025) Grammy Special Merit Award

== In popular culture ==
Beranek appeared on the television game show To Tell the Truth in 1962, around the time of the opening of Philharmonic Hall at Lincoln Center for the Performing Arts in New York City. All four panelists selected him as "the real" Leo Beranek.

== Bibliography ==
- Beranek, Leo L. (2004). Concert halls and opera houses : music, acoustics, and architecture (Second ed.). New York, NY: Springer. ISBN 0-387-95524-0. Beranek, Leo (6 December 2012). 2012 pbk reprint of 2004 edition. Springer. ISBN 978-1-4419-3038-5. (The 2nd edition's title differs from the 1st edition's title.) Concert and opera halls: how they sound (1st ed.). Acoustical Society of America. 1996.
- Beranek, Leo (2010). Riding the Waves : A Life in Sound, Science, and Industry. Cambridge, Massachusetts: MIT Press. ISBN 978-0262513999. (autobiography)
- Beranek, Leo L.; Mellow, Tim (2012). Acoustics : sound fields and transducers. Kidlington, Oxford: Academic Press. ISBN 978-0-123-91421-7.

== See also ==
- Building 20
