= Jarov =

Jarov may refer to places in the Czech Republic:

- Jarov (Plzeň-North District), a municipality and village in the Plzeň Region
- Jarov (Plzeň-South District), a municipality and village in the Plzeň Region
- Jarov, a village and part of Dolní Břežany in the Central Bohemian Region
- Beroun-Jarov, a town part of Beroun in the Central Bohemian Region
