= Termination rates =

Type of telephone service fee

In telephony, call termination refers to the service provided when a telephone network completes (or "terminates") the connection of a call made by a subscriber using another telephone network with a subscriber using the network which makes the connection complete. In relation to mobile telephone calls, termination can apply to either a call made from a fixed telephone line or a call from another mobile phone network. The termination rate is the price one telephone network operator charges another for calls that come from the other operator and terminate with a customer on its own network. The termination rate is one of the three components in the cost of providing telephone service, and the one subject to the most variation.

== Components ==
On every long-distance call in the United States, the customer pays for:

- Origination (dial tone service): connecting the call from the originating customer's equipment to a telephone company central office or exchange). In the era of wired local telephone service (slowly coming to an end with the ubiquity of cell service, starting in the 2010s) this was usually provided by a single company in each locality.
- The transportation of the signal (the call) to another telephone company office near the recipient of the call.
- Termination, completing the call from the receiving company central office to the receiving subscriber's equipment.

Historically, each of these steps could be carried out via a separate company, and the toll paid by the originating (or in some cases the receiving) caller would be split among the three providers. In the United States, the long-distance connection between the two local telephone company offices was furnished by the Bell System, until that was dismantled in 1984 with the mandated splitting of American Telephone & Telegraph (AT&T) for anti-trust reasons. Since then, especially with the two largest remaining companies – AT&T (the same name, but quite different equipment and service) and Verizon, if the same company provides all three components it keeps the entire charge (toll) paid by the customer. Otherwise, the money received is divided; this is known as intercarrier compensation (ICC) and is intended to keep the telecommunications system functioning, by having every phone company receive compensation for the use of its network.

Until 2019 this was the system used for most international phone calls. The originating company in the originating country collects the money (except for collect calls, in which the receiver agrees to pay), keeps some for its expenses, pays some to a company which connects the two countries' networks, and pays another charge, the termination charge, to the company or government agency which connects the incoming international call to the subscriber's equipment in the destination country. While the toll for intra-country (domestic) calls is often controlled by government regulation, there is no world supervision of international call charges. The destination country company or government agency can charge anything the market will bear for its portion of the call — sometimes this varies depending on the part of the receiving country being called — and the originating company must collect and remit this fee to the destination country. As of 2019, there are dramatic differences between countries in the charge demanded by the receiving company for completing (terminating) the call. For example, on one network the 2019 cost of calling from the United States to the Dominican Republic is 6¢ ($0.06) per minute, while a connection to Cuba, a shorter distance, is 92¢ per minute. To some extent this reflects different costs and efficiencies in different countries, but it is used by some countries as a revenue source.

In the past, high termination charges in some countries were used as a payment mechanism for phone sex services. In the best-known example, the Guyana Telephone and Telegraph Company was acquired by a U.S. company specifically for this purpose. The Guyanese were (deliberately) unable to access the phone sex lines.

With the advent of cellular phone service, the basic structure did not change, but the services use different equipment than that used by the traditional networks, the companies are often different, and everything had to be renegotiated. There are often multiple providers for the originating and the termination portions of the call, since with cellular systems, in which the signal (the call) is transmitted between the customer and the central office via digital radio (before 2008, analog radio) rather than copper wire, the cost of setting up a new or competing service is far lower.

In the United States, as of 2011 the termination charge for cellular calls was eliminated by federal regulation, meaning that as perceived by the consumer, there is no difference between the cost of calling a phone on a cell phone network and a phone on the traditional wired network ("land line"). In most other countries this is not the case, and because of the termination charges charged by the mobile networks which complete the calls, which are usually paid by the caller ("calling party pays", although in a few places receiving party pays), the cost of calling a subscriber on a cellular network can be dramatically higher than calling a land line. In some countries the charges vary depending on which of several competing cellular companies completes the call (which company the call recipient subscribes to).

== Explanation ==
A fundamental principle of telecommunications networks is to allow calls originating from a subscriber A to reach a subscriber B, whether on the same network or another, commonly known as "any-to-any connectivity". In more technical terms, traffic originating from Subscriber A is terminated at a point of destination, Subscriber B, and in order to allow for traffic to be routed and terminated between different operators, "interconnection" must be established. Interconnection allows for calls placed by a subscriber in one network to reach a subscriber in another network. Such a call is "terminated" in the destination network.

For example, a customer of Operator A wishes to call a friend who has an Operator B mobile. Operator A will charge the customer a fee per minute (the retail charge) for the call. Operator B will charge Operator A a fee for terminating the call on its network. This termination rate therefore forms part of Operator A's cost of providing the call to its customer.

Termination rates may be commercially negotiated or may be regulated. A range of approaches can be used to regulate rates. International benchmarking or cost models such as a long-run incremental cost (LRIC) model or LRIC+ models are the most common approaches to calculate the efficient levels of termination rates. In LRIC models, the termination costs are calculated for an efficient hypothetical mobile operator. The model assumes that firms use the best technologies to provide mobile calls and services. It is a long-run model as it takes into account the growth of demand, which is calculated using data on observed traffic, income and user information. It considers the time period that the service provider needs to invest in capital improvements to provide the mobile call services. Termination rates derived from this model therefore calculate capacity costs of each element of the network, expressed in terms of per minute use. Under a pure LRIC model, costs are also calculated for an efficient hypothetical firm. The difference between both models is that while the former calculates termination rates through the division of total costs by total demand, pure LRIC methodology calculates termination rates by comparing a firm that provides mobile voice access and one that does not, to determine the necessary costs of providing mobile services.

Historically there was and, in some countries, still is much debate about the best level for interconnection rates. Some argue that approaches based on models do not take into account real world risks and costs and suffer, among other things, from survivorship bias (they consider that risk can be assessed by looking only at the returns of surviving companies) and therefore underestimate the true level of risk. Another concern is based on real options. This considers the benefit that is extinguished from the moment that an investor chooses to invest and suggests that the loss of this right to invest should be taken into account when looking at the expected returns on investments made.

== Data transfer rates ==
An alternative to traditional termination rates is to consider data transfer rates in conjunction with voice over IP (VOIP), which is, like the internet, a peering model. As data transfer is paid on both ends for the same VOIP call, this special form of termination is expected to gain importance. Such a model obviates the need for any regulation at a national level, other than a provision preventing mobile operators from restricting VOIP calls.

== Specific markets ==
=== Africa ===
- Morocco wants to cut the termination rates by up to 70% and end asymmetric rates by 2013.
- The Nigerian Communications Commission, responsible for the largest African mobile market with 61 million subscribers, continually lowers the termination rates.

=== North America ===
Fixed-line termination rates are below 1 ¢/min. The providers are free to negotiate termination rates as long as they are symmetric.

Mobile termination rates (MTRs) in Mexico are currently regulated by the Ley Federal de Telecomunicaciones y Radiodifusión. América Móvil group, consisting of Telcel in mobile services, and Telmex and Telnor in fixed services was declared incumbent in 2014 by the Federal Telecommunications Institute agency in Mexico. Because of this, and article 131 of the Federal Law, Telcel, Telmex and Telnor cannot charge a termination rates to other agents. In mobile services, Telefónica and AT&T charged $0.1869 MXN per minute for voice termination services and $0.0189 for SMS termination services in 2016. For 2017, the termination rates both operators charge will be $0.1906 MXN per minute for voice termination services, and $0.0250 for SMS termination services.

=== Asia ===
Mobile termination rates are 0.90 paisa per minute (nationwide) and Fixed line termination rates ranges from 0.65 to 1.20 paisa per minute (as per call type on the bases of distance.

Mobile termination rate for domestic voice call is 18 Paisa per minute charged based on actual duration. For domestic SMS service, mobile termination rate is 4.5 Paisa per SMS. For domestic MMS service, mobile termination rate is 60 Paisa per MMS. Mobile termination rate for video call is yet to be fixed by operator / regulator. International voice termination to Bangladesh is 1.5 US cents per minute.

Termination charge for calls to Basic (Fixed, Wireless (Fixed), and Mobile with limited mobility) and Cellular networks would be uniform @ Rs. 0.30 per minute. The same termination charge would be applicable for all types of calls viz. Local, National Long Distance and International Long Distance.

=== Europe ===
While termination rates between fixed line telecommunication operators frequently amount to less than US$0.01, mobile termination charges can be significantly higher, especially for international calls. In Europe, the average termination charge for a call varies, ranging from less than 1ct in Austria and Cyprus to much higher charges in Bulgaria. This discrepancy in rates has been identified as a hindrance to competition among telecom providers in the European Union. Termination rates have also played a major role in recent regulation to cap the high cost of roaming in the European Union, where customers paid historically on average almost €1.50/minute in roaming charges. Ultimately, roaming charges have been capped at twice termination rates.

All references to prices in this section are in € Euro cents (ct) for Eurozone countries, and in local currencies otherwise.

Since 2009, the termination rates are symmetric, and decrease every six months by 0.5ct/min. Starting from 4.5ct/minute, they reached 2.01ct/min in mid-2011.

Mobile termination rate in France is 0.55 ct/min for mobile and 0.07 ct/min since Jan 1, 2022. SMS delivery costs 1 ct/SMS. All amounts are in Euro cents and are regulated by Arcep, part of the French government.

The Federal Network Agency has set mobile termination rates to 1.66ct/min for 2014. Landline termination rates are significantly lower.

Effective on annual basis from 1 September 2016 to 31 December 2018, the maximum MTR in Ireland is regulated to be 0.84ct/min for 2016, 0.82ct/min for 2017, and 0.79ct/min for 2018.

Mobile termination rate in Italy was 1.5ct/min for all Mobile Operator except H3G (1.7ct/m) effective July 1, 2012, lowered to 0.98ct/min for all operators from 1 July 2013. Termination costs for SMS have not been regulated yet.

Termination rates in Montenegro were last changed in February 2011, and are symmetric in mobile telecommunication networks. Termination rates in all three mobile networks (M:tel, Telenor and T-Mobile) are as high as 8.5ct/min. Termination rate for SMS and MMS messages is given solely in T-Mobile offer, and is 2.2ct and 6.6ct per message, respectively. Termination rates in T-Com fixed telecommunication network are €2.25ct/min within the same network access point code, and 2.7ct/min nationally. Termination rates in m:tel fixed telecommunication network is 2.81ct/min.

Fixed-line termination rates in Spain are currently from 0.56ct/min to 0.65ct/min depending on interconnect level, with a volume discount of maximum 20%. Mobile termination rates in Spain were historically 4.98ct/min for Yoigo and 4.00ct/min for other operators.

Mobile termination rates are capped to 0.0815 SEK/min (0.9 eurocent) as of July 3, 2014. The fixed line termination rate in Sweden was 0.0253 SEK/min (€0.28ct/min) for the most commonly used termination type (enkelsegment) effective January 2012. Mobile termination rate in Sweden was 0.21 SEK/min (2.35ct/min) effective July 1, 2011. . When it was suggested to lower it to 0.14 SEK (€1,25ct/min) by July 1, 2012.

The termination rates are approximately two or three times higher than in the neighbouring countries Germany and Austria. The rates are not yet symmetric. At 1 January 2011 they were 8.75 rp/min into the Sunrise and Orange networks, and 7 rp/min into the Swisscom network.

Termination charges in the UK are regulated by Ofcom. Maximum rates are set for a variety of number ranges including landline numbers starting 01 and 02, non-geographic numbers starting 03 and mobile numbers starting 071-075 and 077-079. The rates do not apply to landline or mobile numbers allocated in the Channel Islands or Isle of Man. Termination charges for calls to mobile numbers are reviewed every three years and annual reductions are set for the next three years. A separate set of regulations cover non-geographic numbers starting 084, 087, 09 and 118. The termination rate for mobile voice calls was set to 0.68 pence per minute in April 2015, down from more than 4 pence per minute in 2011. These cuts were in response to a campaign by the public, MPs and businesses (including BT and 3). Although fees from termination charges accounted for 14% of the revenue of mobile networks, it was argued that the cuts would allow them to become more competitive and offer cheaper packages to customers. From 1 May 2015, the cap on mobile termination rates was extended to cover calls terminating on all UK mobile providers, previously having applied only to the main four mobile providers. From 1 April 2017, the cap on mobile termination rates was reduced to 0.49 pence per minute.

=== Oceania ===
Termination rates in Australia are regulated by the Australian Competition & Consumer Commission. The Mobile Terminating Access Service (MTAS) has been steadily reduced from 21 cents per minute (AUD) in 2004 to 1.19 cents per minute from 1 January 2021.

== Mobile termination rates monopoly ==
The calling party pays (CPP) principle is the most commonly used termination charging approach among MNOs around the world, especially in the European markets. Within the CPP principle the caller has to pay mobile termination rates (MTRs) and there is no contribution from the called party. However, the called party defined the cost of the MTRs once selected the MNO to register with. This is the root of the MTRs monopoly problem. Since the early days of mobile communications MTRs are considered to be a monopoly. However, this is a market-defined monopoly, since there is no physical limitation such as wires for reaching a mobile user. Thus, MTRs are regulated by national telecommunications regulatory bodies across the world.

== See also ==
- History of mobile phones
- Interconnection
