= Hush-A-Phone Corp. v. United States =

1956 United States federal court case

- Court: United States Court of Appeals for the District of Columbia Circuit
- Full case name: Hush-A-Phone Corporation and Harry C. Tuttle, Petitioners v. United States of America and Federal Communications Commission, Respondents, and American Telephone and Telegraph Company et al., and United States Independent Telephone Association, Intervenors
- Argued: October 4 1956
- Decided: November 8 1956
- Citation: 238 F.2d 266; 99 U.S. App. D.C. 190; 1956 U.S. App. LEXIS 4023

Holding
- Tariffs on Hush-A-Phone device were unwarranted interference with telephone subscriber's right reasonably to use his telephone in ways which are privately beneficial without being publicly detrimental. FCC order set aside and proceedings remanded.

Court membership
- Judges sitting: Chief Judge Henry White Edgerton; Circuit Judges Wilbur Kingsbury Miller, David L. Bazelon

Case opinions
- Majority: Bazelon, joined by Edgerton, Miller

Laws applied
- Communications Act of 1934

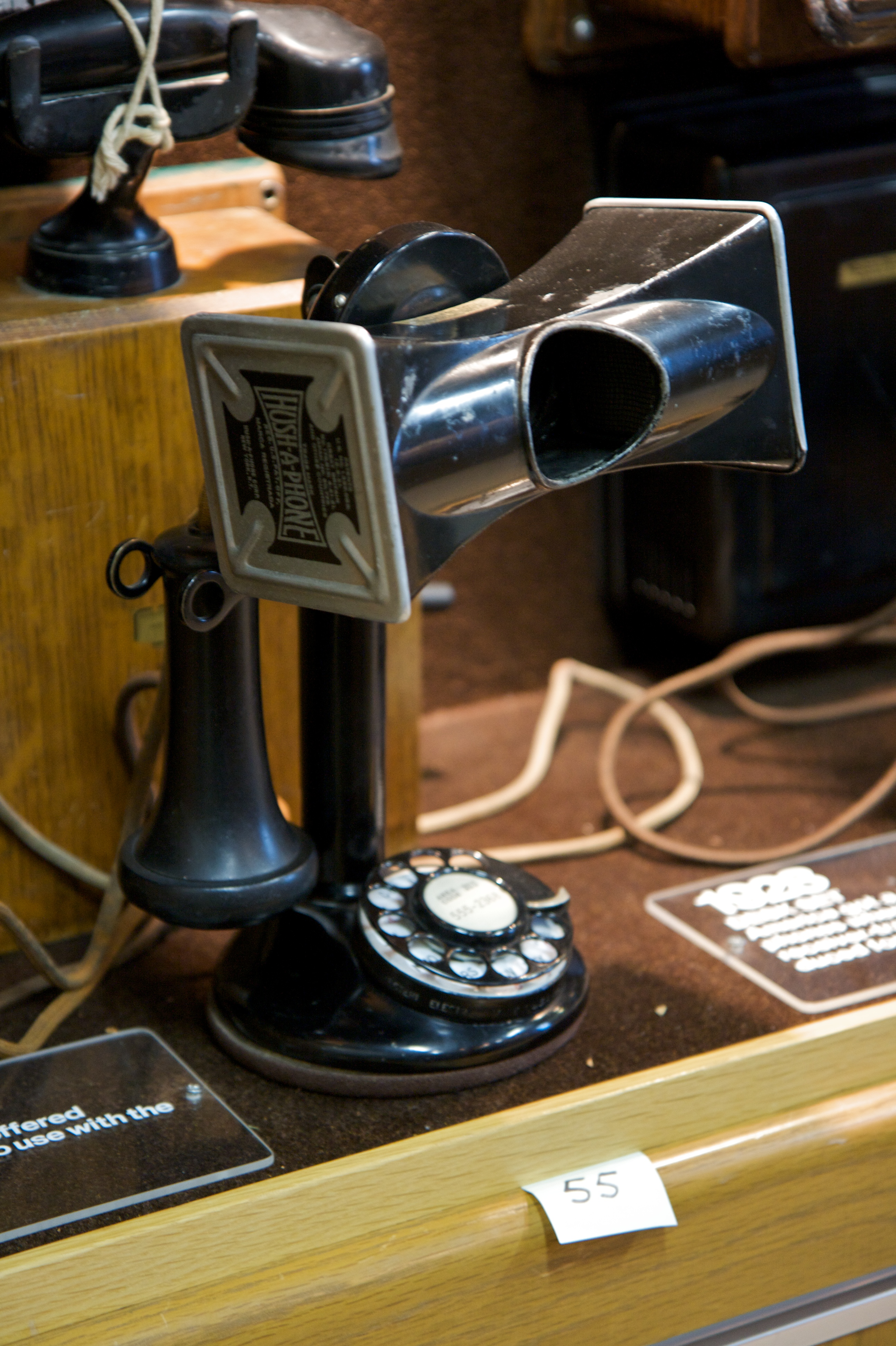
An early Hush-A-Phone model attached to a candlestick telephone.

Hush-A-Phone v. United States, 238 F.2d 266 (D.C. Cir. 1956) was an important ruling in United States telecommunications decided by the D.C. Circuit Court of Appeals. Hush-A-Phone Corporation marketed a small, cup-like device which mounted on the speaking party's microphone, reducing the risk of conversations being overheard and increasing sound fidelity for the listening party. At the time, AT&T had a near-monopoly on America's phone system, even controlling the equipment attached to its network. In this era, Americans had to lease equipment from "Ma Bell" or use approved devices. At this time Hush-A-Phone had been around for 20 years without any issues. However, when an AT&T lawyer saw one in a store window, the company decided to sue on the grounds that anything attached to a phone could damage their network.

AT&T, citing the Communications Act of 1934, which stated in part that the company had the right to make changes and dictate "the classifications, practices, and regulations affecting such charges," claimed the right to "forbid attachment to the telephone of any device 'not furnished by the telephone company.'"

Initially, the Federal Communications Commission (FCC) ruled in AT&T's favor. It found that the device was a "foreign attachment" subject to AT&T control and that unrestricted use of the device could, in the commission's opinion, result in a general deterioration of the quality of telephone service.

== Finding ==
A federal appeals court dismissed AT&T's claim. The court's decision stated that AT&T's prohibition of the device was not "just, fair, and reasonable," as required under the Communications Act of 1934. Per the judgment, the device "does not physically impair any of the facilities of the telephone companies," nor did it "affect more than the conversation of the user." The court thus exonerated Hush-A-Phone and prohibited further interference by AT&T toward Hush-A-Phone users.

After the ruling, it was still illegal to connect some equipment to the AT&T network. For example, modems could not electronically connect to the phone system. Instead, Americans had to connect their modems mechanically by attaching a phone receiver to an acoustic coupler via suction cups.

Regardless, the victory for Hush-A-Phone was widely considered a watershed moment in the development of a secondary market for terminal equipment and the breakup of the Bell System. This landmark decision, and the related Carterfone decision, were seen as precursors to the entry of MCI Communications, the development of more pervasive telecom competition, and the creation of FCC regulations to let users more freely use America's phone network. These changes were perhaps best seen in 1981 when the Hayes Smartmodem electronically connected home computers to the internet for the first time.

== See also ==
- Interconnection
- Leo Beranek - Hush-A-Phone designer
- Phreaking
