= American Telnet =

American company

American TelNet (ATN) was an American 1-900 telephone number company formed c. 1992, operated by Abraham (Michael) Pardes (COO), Michael Self, Howard Markowitz (CFO), and Ted Liebowitz (CEO). It operated phone sex lines, as well as psychic hotlines for Zodiac and American Psychic.

ATN settled a lawsuit with the Federal Trade Commission in 1999 for $39 million over cramming practices. A previous $2.5 million settlement was reached with FTC in 1994.

By 2003 the company had overcharged the psychic hotlines and was beginning to become insolvent. The company dissolved in 2006. At that time Liebowitz owned 53% of the company, Pardes owned 39%, and Markowitz owned 5%.
