= Autopatch =

Telecommunications feature

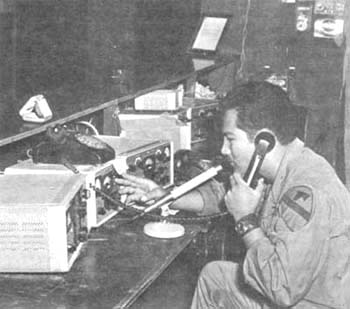
Phone Patch in Vietnam War, 1969

An autopatch, sometimes called a phone patch, is a feature of an amateur radio repeater, two-way radio, or base station to access an outgoing telephone connection. Users with a transceiver capable of producing touch tones (DTMF signals) can make a telephone call, typically limited by settings in the autopatch module to be only to flat-rate numbers, such as local calls or toll-free numbers.

== Phonepatch vs. mobile telephony ==
The practice of connecting an amateur radio station to a telephone network existed from the beginning of amateur radio, and was used commercially as well (as was the case with Carterfone, prompting lawsuits filed by the companies to which it was connected).

The term phone patch more accurately describes a system that is dialed and connected to the telephone network by a user manually operating an amateur radio base station, which was more common before computer technology made automation of the process easier. This is contrasted with mobile telephony, which began with the arrival of the cellular network AMPS, initially using a car phone as the cellular terminal, and finally with the arrival of the DynaTAC, the first mobile phone "properly talking" (being able to hold the whole unit in the hand).

== Uses ==
This feature is primarily used by radio amateurs to provide emergency telephone connectivity to places that have lost their telephone network access. An amateur radio operator with a transceiver installed in their vehicle may provide telephone network access from dozens of miles away, depending on the frequencies of the involved repeater/base station, the power of the transceiver, band conditions, and the gain of the antennas on both ends.

In the United States, autopatch users are required to hang up if they encounter music on hold, as the Federal Communications Commission regulations prohibit music on amateur radio frequencies.

== See also ==
- Carterfone

== Bibliography ==
- Albert Lee: How to talk to Vietnam free. In: Popular Mechanics, September 1970, Page 108–110.
