= Bill and keep =

Telecommunications pricing agreement

Bill and keep (B&K or BAK), also known as net payment zero, is a pricing arrangement for the interconnection (direct or indirect) of two telecommunications networks under which the reciprocal call termination charge is zero. That is, each network agrees to terminate calls from the other network at no charge.

Bill and keep represents an approach to interconnection charging in which networks recover their costs only from their own customers rather than from the sending network. Such an arrangement acts to remove the wholesale cost barrier to retail pricing for off-network calls and has been proven to result in significantly higher levels of calling activity.

On October 27, 2011, the U.S. Federal Communications Commission announced that it would adopt a bill-and-keep framework for all telecommunications traffic exchanged with local exchange carriers as part of an effort to reduce arbitrage practices such as traffic pumping and phantom traffic, encourage the deployment of IP-based networks, and reduce artificial competitive distortions between wireline and wireless carriers.

In the European mobile telecommunications sector, in the absence of a bill and keep arrangement, wholesale markets have traditionally applied the calling party pays principle, in which an originating network pays the terminating network a charge called the mobile termination rate or fixed termination rate for calls to the terminating network. The mobile termination rates paid under the mobile termination rate model, therefore, act as a cost floor to retail pricing, preventing lowering of prices and innovation of retail propositions. In many countries including the UK, the mobile termination rate model has led to a high level of regulatory activity aimed at capping mobile termination rates at a competitive level, which inevitably acts to reinforce the cost floor rather than being pro-competitive.

Although bill and keep has gained momentum, some drawbacks have been identified, such as issues related to the quality of service offered to the end user.
