= Hush-A-Phone =

Privacy enhancing telephone device

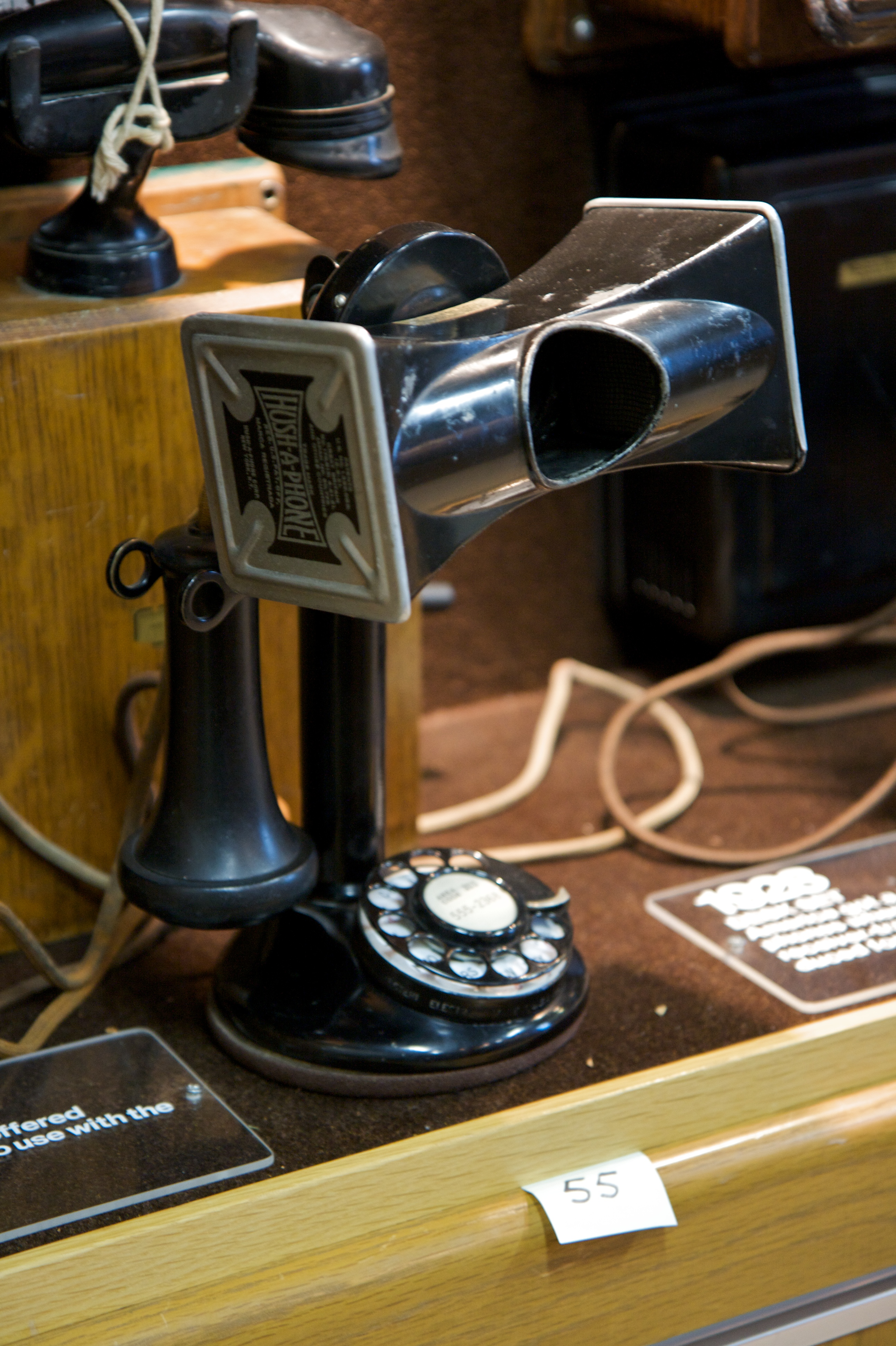
Hush-A-Phone attached to a candlestick telephone on display at Connections Museum Seattle

The Hush-A-Phone was a device designed to attach to the transmitter of a telephone to reduce noise pollution and increase privacy. Sold by the Hush-A-Phone company, the device was frequently described in its commercial advertisements as "a voice silencer designed for confidential conversation, clear transmission and office quiet. Not a permanent attachment. Slips right on and off the mouthpiece of any phone".

Hush-A-Phone Corp. (originally Hush-A-Phone Sales Corp.) was a company founded in New York in 1921 or 1922 to market the Hush-a-Phone.

The device was the topic of a landmark court case, Hush-A-Phone v. United States. The Hush-A-Phone was regularly referred to in telecommunications policy analysis in the 1980s, attracting renewed interest in the 2000s as a symbol of a small company fighting against a monopoly, especially in the context of net neutrality. Indeed, because Hush-A-Phone eventually won its case against the phone company, the final legal proceedings involving the Hush-A-Phone turned out to be relevant to the eventual breakup of the Bell system.

Advertisements for the Hush-A-Phone not only argued for its importance as an aid to privacy, but also noted the device improved clarity of sound, which AT&T would directly argue against.

== History ==
=== 1920–1948: early years ===
The manufacture of Hush-A-Phones began in 1921, and the Hush-A-Phone company was first mentioned in The New York Times in a 1922 classified advertisement for a "typist-dictaphone operator". At this time, Hush-A-Phone was located in New York's Flatiron District, at 41 Union Square. Only a month later, the company advertised for a salesman, noting that 500 Hush-A-Phones were sold in one week at a business show.

The company was still seeking a salesman in April 1922, but stopped posting dedicated sales openings until January 1923, this time noting several thousand Hush-A-Phones had already sold in New York. The company's first classified advertisement for the product appeared June 7, 1922, pricing the product at $10 and offering a free 5-day trial offer. A capital increase to the "Hush-A-Phone Sales Corp." company was announced on December 22, 1922, from $250,000 to $500,000, and in March 1923, the company's name changed from Hush-A-Phone Sales Corp., Manhattan, to Hush-A-Phone Corp.

Some time between May 30, 1923, and October 18, 1923, Hush-A-Phone moved to 10 Madison Avenue, and by May 1924, the company had started suggesting that potential customers outside of New York wanting a demonstration would instead be sent a booklet.

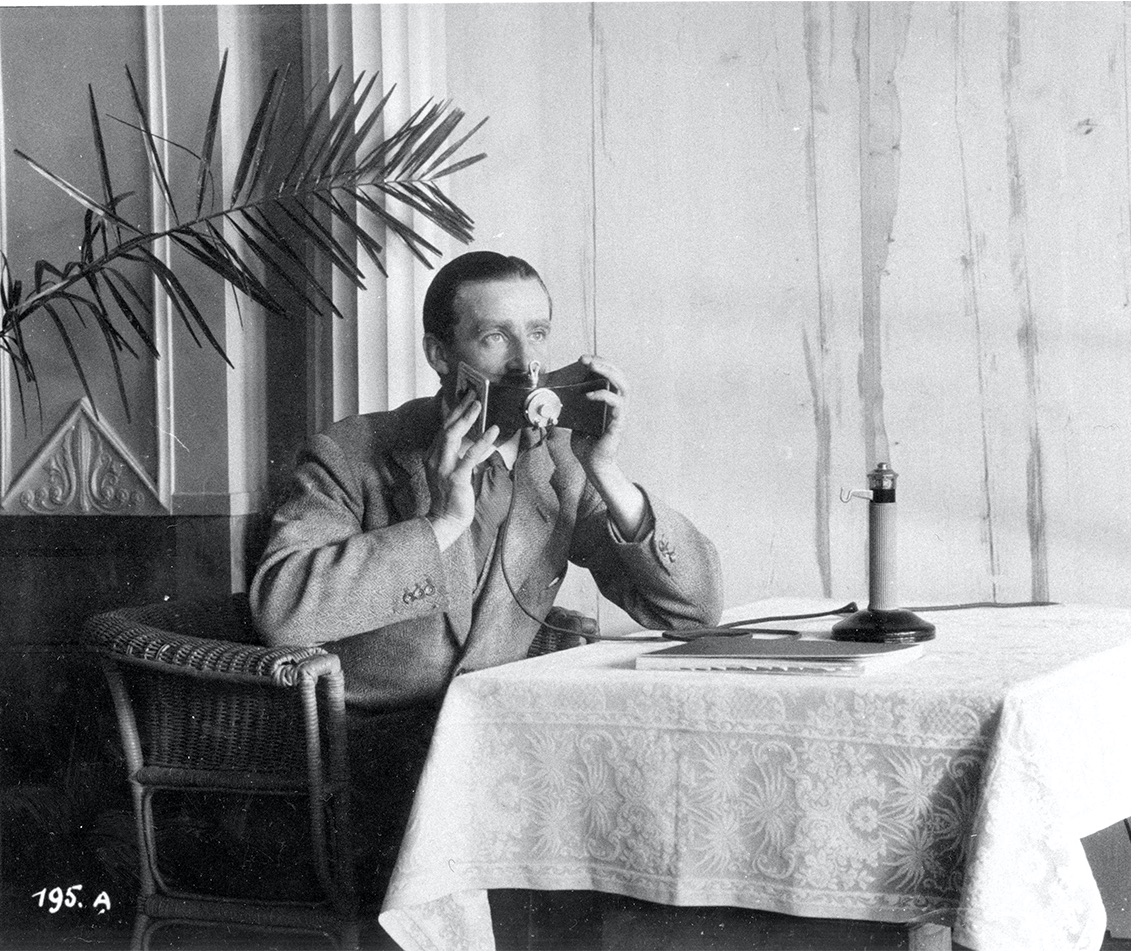
Alan Gordon-Finlay trialling the Hush-a-phone at the League of Nations, circa 1927 – ILO Historical Archives

The Wall Street Crash of 1929 brought trouble to many companies. On October 20, 1929, Hush-A-Phone was advertised along with several other companies on the first page of The New York Times as part of the "National Business Show" being held in Grand Central Palace from October 21 to 24. The company was showing its handset model for the first time. The ad noted that Mr. H. C. Tuttle, President of the Hush-A-Phone Corporation, had just returned from a European tour of ten countries where the product would be distributed. The product was described as being "beautiful", made of bakelite, and "embellished with a work of art in bas-relief. It appears as a handsome desk clock, nine inches high, concealing its function as a Hush-A-Phone".

Some time between October 1927 and December 1929, Hush-A-Phone moved from its Madison Avenue location to about seven blocks southwest to 43 W. 16th Street. Although one more advertisement appeared in 1929 (December 8, just in time for the holidays), Hush-A-Phone was absent from the Times until July 1934, when a four-line, text-only advertisement appeared. Advertisements in 1936 noted a new model "for French phone" was out, and in October 1937 the Hush-A-Phone company was exhibiting again, this time showing a 200-foot elastic telephone wire at the National Business Show. However, the four-line classified advertisements continued to be the company's public appearances after the show, appearing between ads for cigars and baldness cures, until 1942, when their product appeared in photographs in a few ads run by houseware store Lewis & Conger. In 1944 the company noted "Models for E-1 and F-1 Handset Phone; Pedestal Phone; Switchboard and Dictating Machines".

In 1945, Hush-A-Phone ads began appearing in The Washington Post, and Hush-A-Phone consulted with acoustics expert Leo Beranek at MIT, who began work to design an improved silencer. Beranek would later bring in J. C. R. Licklider to help demonstrate the Hush-A-Phone retained clarity of sound.

125,796 Hush-A-Phone sets were sold between 1922 and 1949.

=== 1948–1957: legal disputes with AT&T ===
During the 1940s, telephone service was seen as a "natural monopoly", and AT&T was the sole provider of all aspects of telephone service in much of the U.S., including telephone equipment. In the late 1940s, phone company repairmen began warning customers that using devices like the Hush-A-Phone could result in termination of phone service.

On December 22, 1948, Hush-A-Phone and Harry C. Tuttle, its president, protested to the Federal Communications Commission (FCC), asking them to order the phone company to authorize use of the device. The hearing occurred in 1950, but the original hearing examiner involved died, delaying the initial recommendation.

Some time between May 3 and 12, 1949, the company moved a few doors down, to 65 Madison Ave., and occasionally advertisements exceeded the four-line standard, in Oct 1949 offering free tickets to the "Business Show".

In February 1951, the FCC decided Hush-A-Phone's complaint should be dismissed, but held the case open for the next seven years, permitting further pleadings and reconsideration. A letter to the editor of The Washington Post by John P. Roberts, a communications engineer, described the FCC decision "an invasion of the rights of the individual", adding "even if this quality deterioration had been satisfactorily demonstrated, it is hard to understand why the FCC should have the power to forbid my use of the Hush-A-Phone if I choose to accept the deterioration in quality for the sake of increased privacy". On March 23, 1951, Hush-A-Phone and Harry C. Tuttle submitted filings to the FCC reporting scientific tests proving that the Hush-A-Phone "actually causes a net increase in transmission efficiency of the telephone circuit" and that AT&T and affiliates were "public utility monopolies unlawfully interfering with the natural and inherent rights of a subscriber". FCC official Jack Werner's suggestion was that the telephone company should suspend service to any consumer failing to comply with the regulation prohibiting foreign attachments.

The FCC's final decision was issued on December 23, 1955, and stated "The unrestricted use of the 'Hush-A-Phone' could result in a general deterioration of the quality of interstate and foreign telephone service. Accordingly, it is not an unjust and unreasonable practice upon the part of the defendants to prohibit its use in connection with their telephone services." While the commission agreed that the Hush-A-Phone did provide protection against eavesdroppers and noise from telephone circuits, it impacted intelligibility and voice recognition.

The FCC's 1955 decision was rejected by the U.S. Court of Appeals on November 8, 1956, in the landmark case Hush-A-Phone v. United States, with the decision stating it was an "unwarranted interference with the telephone subscriber's right reasonably to use his telephone in ways which are privately beneficial without becoming publicly detrimental". The ruling set a precedent for permitting non-harmful third-party devices to connect to telephone networks, influencing later decisions such as Carterfone and laying groundwork for early net neutrality and telecom competition regulation. The FCC followed up on February 6, 1957 to officially direct AT&T and Bell System subsidiaries to permit subscribers to use the Hush-A-Phone and similar devices. Advertisements proudly noted "Use of the Hush-A-Phone on telephone is permitted by Federal Appellate Court ruling" beginning in March 1957, and by July were stating "Bell System Approves Use of Hush-A-Phone by tariffs Effective May 16, 1957".

=== 1958–1972 ===
The Hush-A-Phone appeared in ads until the early 1960s, with occasional catalog listings into the early 1970's. Their last direct ad seems to have been on March 13, 1962, after which the product was featured in catalog-type ads posted by stationer's store Goldsmith Brothers through 1970. In 1972, the last classified ad for Hush-A-Phone was listed by Harrison-Hoge Industries, Inc. for $13.95 in black and $15.95 in green, ivory, or beige.

== See also ==
- Carterfone, a device which acoustically connected a two-way radio system to the telephone system
- Acoustic coupler, a device which acoustically connected a modem to the telephone system
