= Phone sex =

Telephone conversation describing sex activities

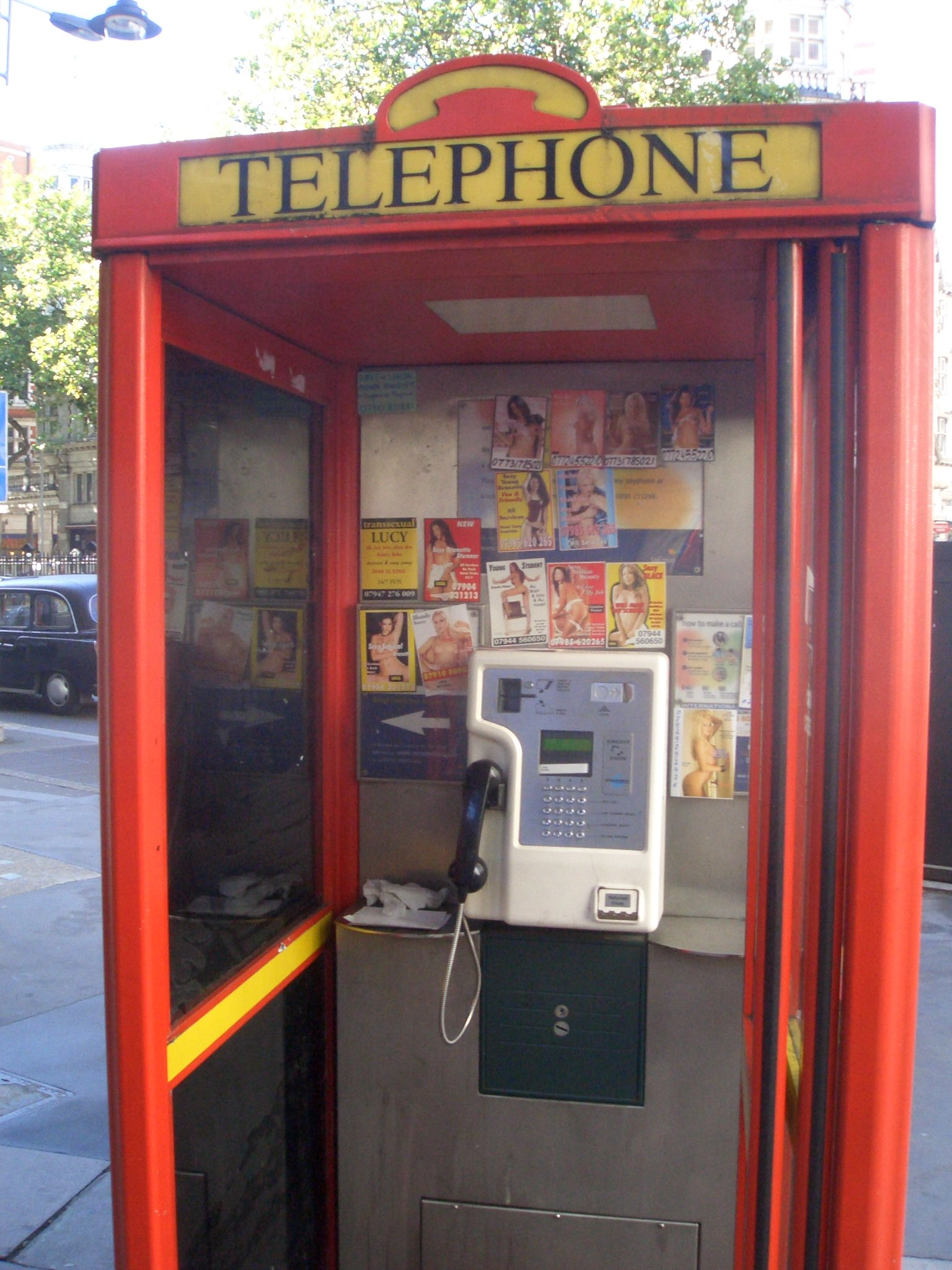
Advertisements for sexual services posted in a phone box, as was common in the UK before the Internet

Phone sex is an erotic conversation between two or more people by means of the telephone that is sexually explicit and is intended to provoke sexual arousal in one or more participants. This practice, which involves the temporary separation of individuals, dates back to the advent of rotary dial telephones, a technological innovation that prevented the possibility of eavesdropping by operators. In the latter part of the 20th century, commercial enterprises began to emerge that specialized in facilitating, for a fee, sexually explicit conversations between clients and phone sex workers.

Phone sex takes imagination on both individuals' part, as each party imagines virtual sex. The sexually explicit conversation takes place between two or more persons via telephone, especially when at least one of the participants either masturbates or engages in sexual fantasy.

Phone sex conversation may take many forms, including: guided fantasy, sexual sounds, narrated and enacted suggestions, sexual anecdotes and confessions, candid expression of sexual fantasies, feelings, or love, or discussion of personal and sensitive sexual topics. Once means of transmitting payment were developed, phone sex turned into primarily a commercial activity, with customers and sellers.

== As a substitute for physical intimacy ==
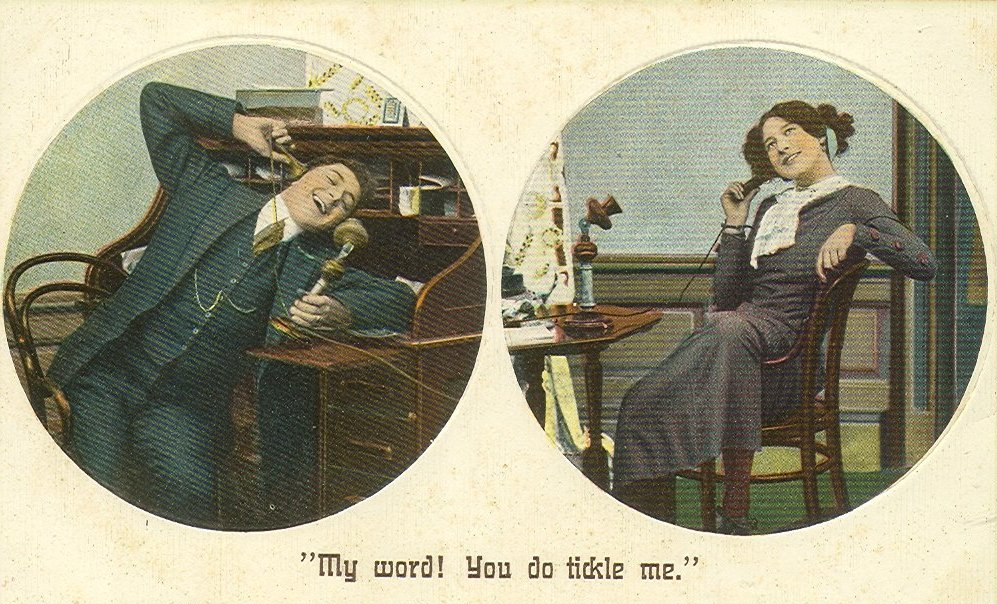
Erotic conversation; postcard, c.1910

Phone sex (erotic talk) does not involve physical contact between those participating in it. Couples may choose to engage in phone sex when the inconvenience of distance makes physical intimacy infrequent or impossible.

Due to the potential for emotional intimacy between those who have engaged in phone sex, it is a matter of some debate whether phone sex is to be considered infidelity when a committed personal relationship participates with someone who is not their partner. Though phone sex may involve sex workers, especially when engaged through a sex hotline, it should not be confused with arrangements for in-person prostitution made over a phone call.

== As a business ==
=== Origin ===
The editor of High Society magazine, Gloria Leonard, is credited with being one of the first people to use "976 numbers", then "900 numbers" for promotional purposes and soon as a revenue stream in the sex industry. In the early 1980s, Leonard recorded her own voice informing callers of the contents of the next issue of High Society magazine before its publication. Later she recorded others such as Annie Sprinkle "talking sexy". Leonard convinced magazine owner Carl Ruderman to purchase more of these numbers and the business began to be successful using the magazine to promote the service. Leonard herself was surprised at the success of the numbers.

=== Operation ===
Originally, phone sex services consisted of a managed network of dispatchers (live or automated) and erotic performers. Performers would come to a studio where they received a cubicle, coaching, and cash incentives to keep callers on the line longer. This is the world portrayed in Spike Lee's movie about phone sex, Girl 6. At that time independent phone sex was more dangerous, as Lee's movie portrays.

With the progress of technology it became more practical, convenient, and economical for providers to work out of their homes. Human dispatchers answered the advertised phone numbers, processed payment via credit card, decided which of the available performers best matched the clients' fantasy, and connected the client with the provider. The caller could not see the performer's number. Either could hang up, though some services put economic pressure on providers not to do so.

Originally, per-minute billing was provided by phone companies. In the United States this billing was facilitated by the use of 976 and later 900 premium-rate numbers. Some services tried to keep the caller aroused but short of orgasm so the caller would spend more money; this tactic is still in use by some providers. When public pressure forced the phone companies to stop providing this service to sex workers, a transition was made to pre-paid blocks of time. The incentives for providers were then reversed: rather than earning money from keeping the customer on the line, they earned more from bringing the caller to orgasm quickly so the provider could move on rapidly to another call. Unused minutes were rarely usable if the customer called again.

Once the Internet had become relatively mature, the sale of any sexual service not involving a minor could be made to anyone not a minor. Software platforms were custom written to handle money collection and transfer, connecting caller and performer though neither could see anything but the platform's phone number, and metering the connection. Details vary significantly from one platform to another, but the provider may be given a personal page on the platform to use however the performer wishes. Big platforms as of 2016 are Niteflirt, TalktoMe, and My Phone Site; the latter also includes provision by which a manager, with the consent of the providers, could have a virtual shop with many providers under them. Non-US customers were courted. Customers had a variety of payment options, and pages of providers to choose from, sometimes with voice samples available. The seller provides the picture, description, and sets the price, a percentage of which is kept by the platform. In the sex industry, similar platforms emerged facilitating the selling of used panties and other odoriferous garments. "Cam" video sessions also emerged, in which the caller can pay to direct the provider's actions on video. For a higher fee, the caller can have a private connection in which no one can see the caller or provider except each other.

==== United States ====
By the end of the 1980s, nearly all of the major local phone companies in the United States, plus the major long-distance carriers, were actively involved in the phone sex business. The telephone companies would provide billing services for phone sex companies. Typically the telephone companies would bill callers to phone sex lines and then remit 45% of the money collected to the performers. The telephone companies placed the chat line charges on a customer's local phone bill. If a customer disputed a charge, the telephone company would usually refund the charge but block the caller from calling any other phone sex lines. In 1988, the American phone sex industry generated an estimated $54 million annually (for both producers and telecommunications providers), according to the Information Industry Bulletin. In the 1990s and into the 2000s American Telnet was one of the largest phone sex companies in the US.

In 2002 profits from phone sex were estimated at one billion dollars a year. In 2007 the group Citizens for Responsibility and Ethics in Washington estimated that phone sex earned U.S. telephone companies close to $500 million per year. By 2007 Verizon and MCI had merged and only a few phone sex companies remained active as a result; Verizon, Sprint, and AT&T were the only carriers still providing billing services to these companies. Verizon provided billing services to calls made in Massachusetts, Rhode Island and Maine. AT&T and MCI offered nationwide collection services, with a cap of $50 per call.

The vast majority of modern services in the United States use toll-free numbers whereby clients can dial up to request a call with a particular performer using credit cards, ACH Network systems, and a variety of other billing methods. There are still some services that rely upon premium-rate telephone numbers for billing purposes, although this practice has been largely abandoned due to the high rate of fraud associated with these lines and the inability to dial 900 and 976 lines from cellular phones. As a direct result, most telephone companies allow their customers to block outgoing calls to premium-rate telephone numbers. In 1996, the FCC changed regulations on 900 numbers to address abuse of these services by minors and fraud concerns.

Independent phone sex operators engage in self-promotion. This self-promotion can involve a personalized website where the phone sex performer lists their specialties and services, engaging prospects in social media, various methods of advertising, or surfing of sexually themed chat rooms for interested clients.

Phone sex service providers typically advertise their services in men's magazines, in pornographic magazines and videos, on late-night cable television, and online. Some phone sex services use state-of-the-art customer acquisition techniques such as active database marketing to reach potential clients. These advertising methods almost invariably target men, the primary consumers of phone sex services. Some providers advertise on third-party network sites that allow privacy for the provider and the customer.

The major phone sex and adult chat lines spend millions of dollars in advertising every month. Thanks to technology, their marketing departments can track the effectiveness of their advertising campaigns by assigning unique phone numbers to each advertising campaign, regardless if it includes TV, print, online or a combination of all these. Unique numbers might either be toll-free 1-800 numbers or local access numbers in order to accommodate callers who have been targeted in a local advertising campaign. Phone sex services will usually list all the local numbers on their websites. Assigning unique phone numbers to each advertising channel allows phone chat companies to measure not only the number of calls that each channel generates but also the price per call, conversion rate, and return on investment. This information can be further analyzed to determine key insights such as the most and least profitable caller's demographics, best and worst times to advertise, and ultimately which advertising channels to invest more in and which ones to cut.

==== United Kingdom ====
Phone sex lines appeared in the UK in the 1980s using premium-rate telephone numbers for adult services with sexual content, with many of the lines playing tape recordings. The phone sex market in the UK is closely linked to the pornographic magazine market, and advertising for such services often provides a vital element of a magazine's revenue. Up to a quarter of the page length of some magazines was devoted to such advertisements. The sexual themes covered by phone sex lines included kinky sexual practices that could not be shown graphically in magazines due to the country's obscenity laws.

Advertising in newspapers, which had been common in the 1980s, was ended as a result of regulatory changes in 1994 which restricted advertisements to top-shelf adult magazines. At the same time rules were introduced requiring the user to proactively opt in by requesting a PIN. This dramatically reduced the number of calls, and the proportion of the income generated by premium-rate telephone numbers which was associated with adult services fell from 18% in 1992 to 1% in 1996. During the 1990s many companies began to re-route their traffic abroad in an attempt to circumvent the regulations. The industry took to operating from 40 countries worldwide, commonly Guyana and the Caribbean. In 1995 the income generated in this way was $2 billion. The regulations also led to an increase in the use of live call-back services paid by credit cards, which did not fall under the regulator's jurisdiction because they did not use premium-rate numbers.

By 2009 the proportion of the UK population that had used phone sex lines was 45%, according to a survey by Durex. Most phone sex workers were recruited through word of mouth or the internet as the companies were widely forbidden from advertising in mass media. According to a BBC-commissioned investigation, twice as many university students worked for phone sex lines in 2013 as did in 2011. The industry's regulatory body, Ofcom (formerly Phone-paid Services Authority, ICSTIS and PhonePayPlus) monitors and enforces specific community standards in terms of content and price for premium rate numbers.

=== Legality ===
The legality of phone sex businesses was challenged by the U.S. Federal government in July 1988 with the passage of the Telephone Decency Act, which made it a crime to use a "telephone ... directly or by recording device" to make "any obscene or indecent communication for commercial purposes to any person," punishable by a $50,000 fine or six months in prison." At the time the Federal Communications Commission (FCC) was responsible for policing 900 numbers for obscenity and indecency.

Sable Communications of California filed suit against the FCC in federal court to overturn the Telephone Decency Act. On July 19, 1988, U.S. District Judge A. Wallace Tashima ruled that "the prohibition against 'indecent speech' on 900-number recordings was unconstitutional, though its ban on 'obscene speech' could stand."

On June 23, 1989, the U.S. Supreme Court ruled that obscene speech, even in commercial telephone calls, was not protected, though indecent speech was. Justice Byron White wrote for the high court's majority

There is no constitutional barrier under Miller to prohibiting communications that are obscene in some communities under local standards even though they are not obscene in others." "Sable, which has the burden of complying with the prohibition, is free to tailor its messages, on a selective basis, to the communities it chooses to serve.

=== Workers ===
A phone sex worker is a type of sex worker, sometimes referred to as a "phone sex operator", "fantasy artist", "adult phone entertainer", "audio erotic performer", as well as various other monikers. The most valued attributes of a phone sex professional are the voice, acting, and sexual roleplay skills, along with the experienced ability to discern and respond appropriately to a broad spectrum of customer requests.

=== Online companies ===
Several online companies provide Internet-based phone sex lines. These services enable callers to post profiles of themselves and then engage in VOIP-based and other types of online sex.

== See also ==
- Cybersex
- Chat line
- Erotic talk
- Mobile porn
- Obscene phone call
- Safe sex
- Sexting
- Termination rates
- Work-at-home scheme
