= Calling party pays =

Calling party pays (CPP) is a payment model in telephony, especially in cellular markets, that states that the total cost of a call is borne by the caller (calling party) and not the receiver (called party). It is also known as "Calling party network pays" or CPNP.

Traditionally, two more models have existed:

The receiving party pays (RPP) model, in which the caller pays for making the call and the receiver pays for receiving it.

Bill and keep model.

== Components of cost ==
In general, the total cost of each call placed by a subscriber of a mobile network operator (MNO) has two components – calling rate and call termination rate. The "calling rate", also called "call charge" is the amount charged by the caller’s MNO to the caller. The "call termination rate", or simply " termination rate", is the amount the receiver's MNO charges from the caller's MNO, in order to end the call in the receiver's network. A "mobile network operator" is also known as "wireless service provider", "wireless carrier", "cellular company", "mobile network carrier", "network operator" or "telecommunications service provider".

Since the early years of mobile communications, the scientific community and regulatory authorities have made efforts to reduce or overcome the negative effects of the monopolistic regime introduced by call termination costs. However, the attempts have been limited to either implementing billing systems focused on the party that pays the call termination costs or on regulatory rules enforced on the MNOs. Thus, the "Calling party pays" (CPP) principle combined with the presence of a strong regulator, and the "Receiving party pays" (RPP) principle, are deemed to eliminate the negative effects of the monopolistic market for termination rates.

== How CPP works ==
Consider this scenario: "A" is the subscriber of an MNO by the name "MNO1". "A" intends to make a phone call to "B" who is a subscriber of "MNO2".

For the call to happen, the two MNOs need to be interconnected. Both MNOs charge their respective subscribers for their services. In this scenario, MNO1 provides the origination service and MNO2 terminates the call. MNO1 charges A based on the "calling rate". MNO2 charges MNO1 based on the " termination rate" (TR). MNO1 passes on the TR cost to A in full.

In contrast, under the RPP model, A pays MNO1 for origination services only, while B is charged by MNO2 for the termination service.

In both models, there is no alternative for terminating service. Therefore, the terminating MNO, specifically MNO2 in this instance, holds a monopoly over termination services according to the CPP principle. This allows MNO2 to potentially exploit the originating service provider, MNO1, by establishing monopolistic termination rates. This holds true for each call terminated under CPP, as long as a single network realises the termination. Consequently, there is always an incentive for terminating MNOs to set monopolistic termination rates, irrespective of the MNO that serves as the originating or terminating service. Moreover, termination costs are considered a part of the marginal cost of calls. So originating MNOs have an incentive to pass on high termination costs to their own subscribers.
