= Interconnection =

Physical linking between telecom networks

In telecommunications, interconnection is the physical linking of a carrier's network with equipment or facilities not belonging to that network. The term may refer to a connection between a carrier's facilities and the equipment belonging to its customer, or to a connection between two or more carriers.

In United States regulatory law, interconnection is specifically defined (47 C.F.R. 51.5) as "the linking of two or more networks for the mutual exchange of traffic."

One of the primary tools used by regulators to introduce competition in telecommunications markets has been to impose interconnection requirements on dominant carriers.

== History ==
=== United States ===
Under the Bell System monopoly (post Communications Act of 1934), the Bell System owned the phones and did not allow interconnection, either of separate phones (or other terminal equipment) or of other networks; a popular saying was "Ma Bell has you by the calls".

This began to change in the landmark case Hush-A-Phone v. United States [1956], which allowed some non-Bell owned equipment to be connected to the network, and was followed by a number of other cases, regulatory decisions, and legislation that led to the transformation of the American long distance telephone industry from a monopoly to a competitive business.

This further changed in FCC's Carterfone decision in 1968, which required the Bell System companies to permit interconnection by radio-telephone operators.

Today the standard electrical connector for interconnection in the US, and much of the world, is the registered jack family of standards, especially RJ11. This was introduced by the Bell System in the 1970s, following a 1976 FCC order. Since then, it has gained popularity worldwide, and is a de facto international standard.

=== Europe ===
Outside of the U.S., Interconnection or "Interconnect regimes" also take into account the associated commercial arrangements. As an example of the use of commercial arrangements, the focus by the EU has been on "encouraging" incumbents to offer bundles of network features that will enable competitors to provide services that compete directly with the incumbent. Further the interconnect regime decided upon by the regulator has a major impact on the development/rate of growth of market segments. According to Source8 (an EU based consultancy) two examples from the UK of this are:

- The decision about revenue sharing on local rate numbers was a contributory factor in the explosive growth in dial internet.
- The asynchronous reciprocity that exists between fixed and mobile termination rates.

== See also ==
- Customer-premises equipment
- Demarcation point
- Forced-access regulation
- Registered jack
- Terminal equipment
- Termination rates

=== US regulation ===
- Category:United States federal communications legislation
