= LRIC =

LRIC or LRAIC (the distinction between the two is presented below) is an abbreviation for "long-run average incremental cost". A LRIC model is often used in telecommunications regulation to determine the price paid by competitors for services provided by an operator with significant market power, usually the incumbent (former monopoly).

== Components ==
Each of LRIC's components is analysed below.

=== Long run ===
Long run implies that all inputs are considered variable. In other words, even capital equipment can vary in response to a change in demand.

=== Average ===
LRAIC can be defined as including all the costs of services provided within an increment. In the context of telecommunications, LRAIC has often been used to set interconnection charges with the increments usually defined as the whole group of services using the core network. These services (PSTN, leased lines, etc.) include those provided by the operator with significant market power, as well as those of interconnecting operators. The costs of the network providing this wider group of services are then divided by all the traffic to produce the average incremental cost. LRIC (long-run incremental cost), in contrast, can be defined more narrowly to include the costs of adding or removing a defined quantity of traffic, or the addition or removal of a smaller set of services, such as local calls, within the broader LRAIC increment.

=== Incremental ===
In principle, there are an infinite number of different sized increments that could be measured. However, these increments can effectively be grouped into three different categories: 1. a small change in the volume of a particular service; 2. the addition of a whole service; or 3. the addition of a whole group of services. The first definition of the increment is equivalent to a measurable version of marginal cost, that is the cost associated with providing a very small, literally infinitesimal change in output. The second definition may apply to services of very different sizes, such as interconnection, local calls and premium-rate calls.
