= Jarov (Plzeň-North District) =

- Municipality
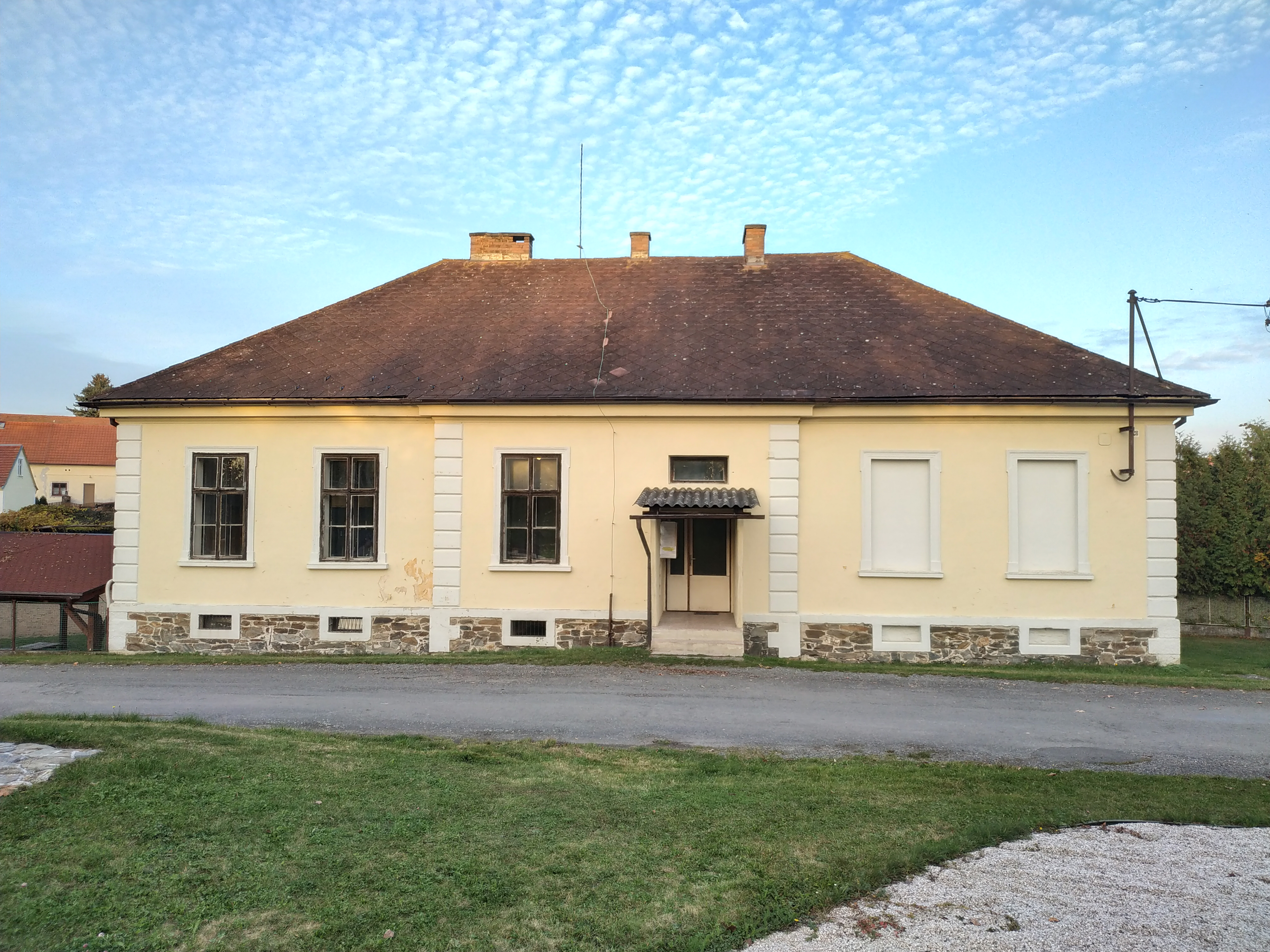
- Former primary school

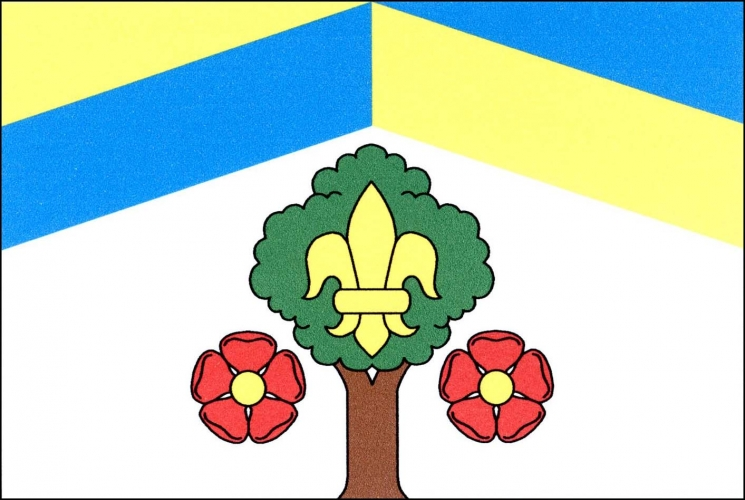
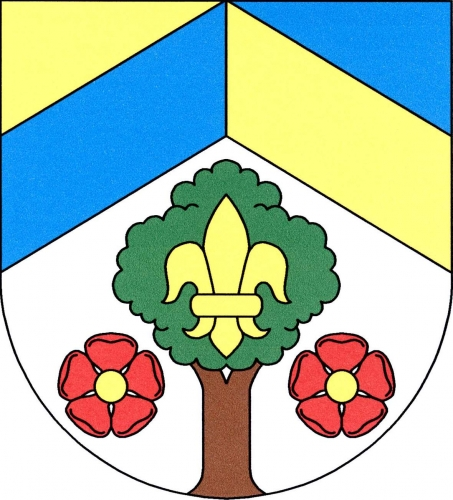
- Flag Coat of arms

- Location in the Czech Republic
- Coordinates: 49°52′21″N 13°28′28″E
- Country: Czech Republic
- Region: Plzeň
- District: Plzeň-North
- First mentioned: 1250

Area
  - Total: 10.58 km^{2} (4.08 sq mi)
- Elevation: 381 m (1,250 ft)

Population (2026-01-01)
  - Total: 145
  - Density: 13.7/km^{2} (35.5/sq mi)
- Time zone: UTC+1 (CET)
  - Summer (DST): UTC+2 (CEST)
- Postal code: 331 51
- Website: www.oujarov.cz

Jarov is a municipality and village in Plzeň-North District in the Plzeň Region of the Czech Republic. It has about 100 inhabitants.

Jarov lies approximately 16 kilometres (10 mi) north-east of Plzeň and 72 km (45 mi) west of Prague.

== Demographics ==
Historical population
Year	Pop.	±%
1869	396	—
1880	391	−1.3%
1890	395	+1.0%
1900	331	−16.2%
1910	337	+1.8%
1921	332	−1.5%
1930	268	−19.3%
1950	186	−30.6%
1961	182	−2.2%
1970	150	−17.6%
1980	160	+6.7%
1991	122	−23.8%
2001	137	+12.3%
2011	136	−0.7%
2021	131	−3.7%
Source: Censuses
