= Carterfone =

Device to connects a two-way radio to the telephone system

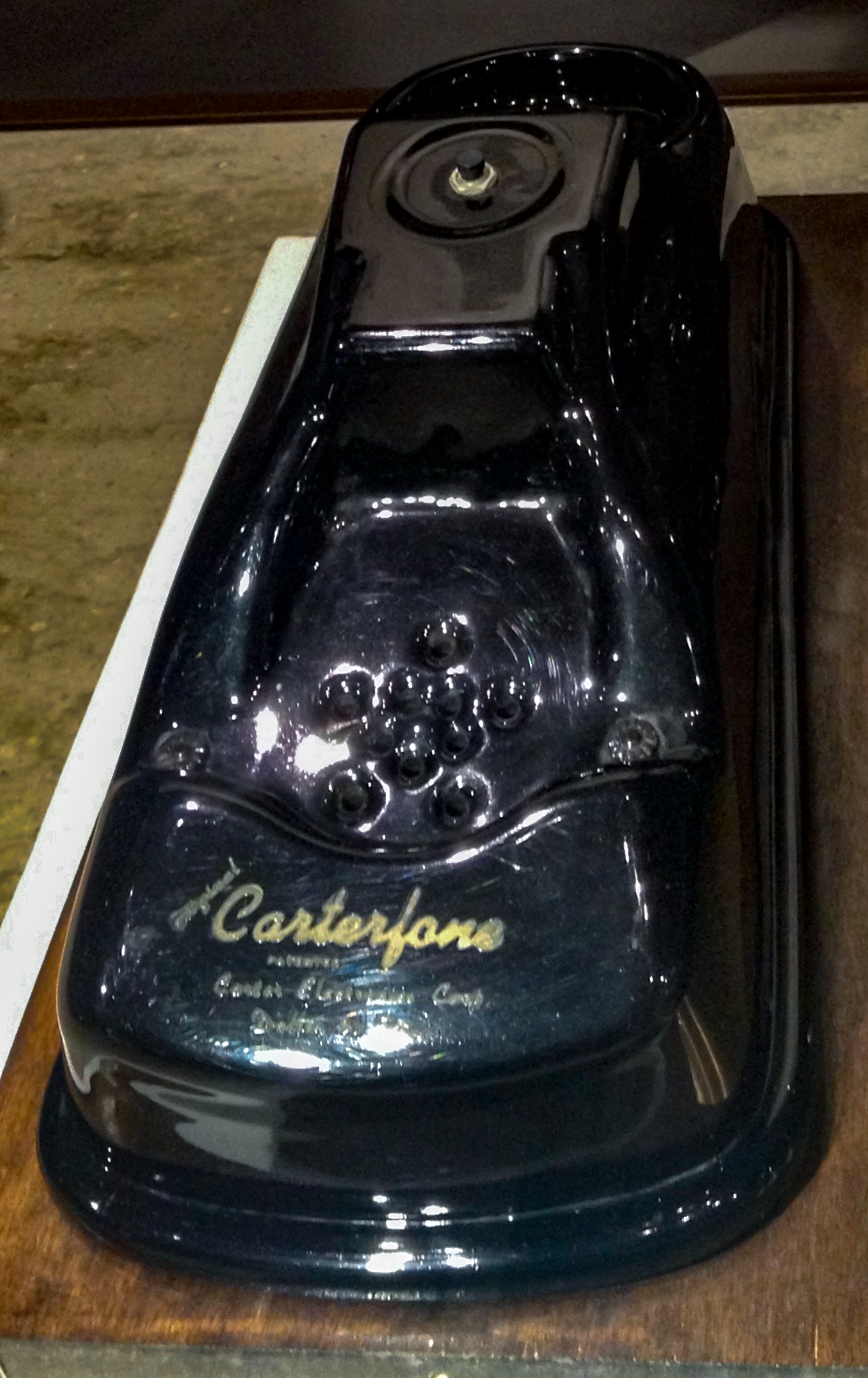
An original 1959 Carterfone made by Carter Electronics, on display at the Computer History Museum

The Carterfone is a device invented by Thomas Carter. It connects a two-way radio system to the telephone system, allowing someone on the radio to talk to someone on the phone. This makes it a direct predecessor to today's autopatch. The connection is acoustic -- sound travels through the air between the Carterfone and a conventional telephone that is part of the telephone system.

The reason the Carterfone connected the telephone and radio acoustically, instead of electrically, is that telephone network owners were legally allowed to and did bar devices they did not own from being connected electrically to their networks.

The Carterfone decision (13 F.C.C.2d 420) was a landmark United States regulatory decision that opened the public switched telephone network (PSTN) in America to customer-premises equipment (CPE). Twelve years earlier in 1956, a court had ruled in the Hush-A-Phone case that devices could mechanically connect to the telephone system (such as a rubber cup attached to a phone-company-owned telephone) without the permission of AT&T. In 1968, the Federal Communications Commission (FCC) extended this privilege by allowing the Carterfone and other devices to be connected electrically to the AT&T network, as long as they did not cause harm to the system.

== Description ==
The device is acoustically, but not electrically, connected to the public switched telephone network. It was electrically connected to the base station of the mobile radio system, and got its power from the base station. All electrical parts were encased in bakelite, an early plastic.

When someone on a two-way radio wished to speak to someone on phone, or "landline" (e.g., "Central dispatch, patch me through to McGarrett"), the station operator at the base would dial the telephone number. When callers on the radio and on the telephone were both in contact with the base station operator, the handset of the operator's telephone was placed on a cradle built into the Carterfone device. A voice-operated switch in the Carterfone automatically switched on the radio transmitter when the telephone caller was speaking; when they stopped speaking, the radio returned to a receiving condition. A separate speaker was attached to the Carterfone to allow the base station operator to monitor the conversation, adjust the voice volume, and hang up their telephone when the conversation had ended.

== Landmark regulatory decision ==
This particular device was involved in a landmark United States regulatory decision related to telecommunications. In a twelve-year prior decision from 1956, a court had ruled in the Hush-A-Phone case that devices could mechanically connect to the telephone system (such as a rubber cup attached to a phone-company-owned telephone) without the permission of AT&T. In 1968, the Federal Communications Commission extended this privilege by allowing the Carterfone and other devices to be connected electrically to the AT&T network, as long as they did not cause harm to the system. This ruling, commonly called "the Carterfone decision" (13 F.C.C.2d 420), created the possibility of selling devices that could connect to the phone system using a protective coupler rented from AT&T and opened the market to customer-premises equipment. The decision is often referred to as "any lawful device", allowing later innovations like answering machines, fax machines, and modems (which initially used the same type of manual acoustic coupler as the Carterfone) to proliferate.

In February 2007, a petition for rulemaking was filed with the FCC by Skype, requesting the FCC to apply the Carterfone regulations to the wireless industry—which would mean that OEMs, portals and others will be able to offer wireless devices and services without the cellular operators needing to approve the handsets. However, on April 1, 2008, FCC chairman Kevin Martin indicated that he would oppose Skype's request. On April 17, 2015, this petition for rulemaking was dismissed without prejudice by the FCC at the request of Skype's current owner, Microsoft Corporation.

== See also ==
- Autopatch
- Acoustic coupler
- Hush-a-Phone v. United States
- Interconnection
- Modem
- Cordless telephone
- Terminal equipment
- Telephone
- Radio
- Citizens band radio
