= Warner Bros. Discovery International =

International unit of Warner Bros. Discovery

- Final logo, used from 2022 to 2026
- Formerly: Turner Broadcasting System International (1985–2020); WarnerMedia International (2020–2022)
- Type: Division
- Industry: Broadcasting
- Predecessors: Turner Broadcasting System International; WarnerMedia International; Discovery Networks International
- Founded: 1985; 41 years ago (original); 2022; 4 years ago (Merger with Discovery Networks International)
- Founder: Ted Turner (Turner Broadcasting System International); John S. Hendricks (Discovery Networks International)
- Defunct: October 6, 2026; 46 days ago
- Fate: Merged with Paramount International Networks
- Successor: Skydance Global Content Sales
- Headquarters: Warner House, 98 Theobalds Rd, London, England, United Kingdom; Piet Heinkade 173 1019 GM, Amsterdam, Netherlands
- Key people: List: Gerhard Zeiler (chairman & President WBD International); James Gibbons (president & Managing Director, Asia-Pacific - Australia, New Zealand and Japan); Clement Schwebig (president & Managing Director, Western Europe and Africa/Corporate Officer); Kasia Kieli (president & Managing Director, Poland, and CEO of TVN); Christina Sulebakk (EVP & Managing Director, Nordics); Fernando Medin (president, Latin America and U.S. Hispanic); Jamie Cooke (EVP & Managing Director, CEE MENAT, EMEA Creative and PayTV); Andrew Georgiou (president & Managing Director, UK & Ireland and WBD Sports Europe); Alessandro Araimo (EVP & Managing Director, Italy & Iberia)
- Parent: Warner Bros. Discovery (1985–2026)
- Divisions: Warner Bros. International Television Production; Warner Bros. Discovery Americas; Warner Bros. Discovery Asia-Pacific; Warner Bros. Discovery EMEA; TVN Warner Bros. Discovery

Warner Bros. Discovery International, formerly known as Turner Broadcasting System International and WarnerMedia International, was the international unit of Warner Bros. Discovery Global Linear Networks led by President Gerhard Zeiler. The unit oversaw the production, broadcasting and promotion of its key brands outside of the United States. These brands include Adult Swim, Animal Planet, Boomerang, Cartoon Network, Discovery Channel, HBO, TLC, TBS, TNT, and Warner TV.

The networks' headquarters are located in London. Other international offices are located in São Paulo, Buenos Aires, Santiago, Mexico City, Amsterdam, Warsaw, Milan, Mumbai, Paris, Singapore, Bogotá, and Auckland amongst others.

== Divisions ==
=== Europe, Middle East, and Africa ===
Warner House, headquarters of company in London (2022)

In 1985, Ted Turner would launch a European division in London, England, which reached across the Middle East and African regional feeds, Around the same time Discovery Channel would launch in April in Europe. In mid-2007, Discovery Networks Europe would be split into two various branches around Europe.

On 27 November 2012, Discovery announced it would acquire Dubai-based broadcaster Takhayal Entertainment, which owns MENA lifestyle channel Fatafeat. This acquisition was then completed.

On 21 December 2012, Discovery announced it had acquired a 20% stake in the pan-European sports broadcaster Eurosport from TF1 Group for €170 million (US$221.6 million). On 21 January 2014, Discovery acquired an additional 51% share to gain controlling interest, and subsequently acquired the remainder for €491 million in July 2015 to receive sole ownership.

In June 2015, Discovery acquired pan-European rights to the Olympic Games from 2018 through 2024, excluding Russia, on all platforms, in a €1.3 billion deal. Discovery will primarily broadcast the Games on local outlets (including Eurosport), but will sub-license coverage to over-the-air broadcasters in each region.

Through its purchase of SNI, Discovery added the Polish broadcaster TVN Group to its European portfolio, which SNI had acquired in 2015 from ITI Group and Canal+ Group., as well as the UKTV joint venture with BBC Worldwide (later BBC Studios).

In August 2016, Discovery renewed its distribution deals in 12 countries with shareholder Liberty Global. On 31 January 2017, after nearly facing a carriage dispute, Discovery renewed its distribution deals in Germany and the United Kingdom with Sky plc.

In November 2016, Discovery partnered with the streaming media company BAMTech to create a joint venture to serve Europe. In May 2017, ProSiebenSat.1 Media and Discovery announced a joint venture to create a German over-the-top content service, built upon its existing 7TV service.

In August 2017, Discovery announced that it would acquire the remaining 51.06% of Green Content, the operator of the Polish DTT channel Metro, from Agora SA for PLN19,000,000 under a share buyback agreement.

On 3 July 2020, Discovery agreed to acquire the German free-to-air station Tele 5 from Leonine Holding.

In December 2020, the Discovery-backed GB News received a licence from Ofcom to broadcast on their service on various British platforms, such as Freeview, in 2021. GB News was set up by Andrew Cole and Mark Schneider from Liberty Global.

In March 2021, Discovery was made available to beIN Media Group subscribers in the Middle East and North Africa. The two organizations have worked together since 2016, but this is the first time that Discovery Channel itself has been made available.

In 2022, Discovery merged with WarnerMedia, forming Warner Bros. Discovery EMEA, with the new entity being responsible for the assets in Europe, Middle East, and Africa.

In December 2024, Warner Bros. Discovery has begun the process of selling the TVN Group - its Polish unit which is a part of TVN Warner Bros. Discovery. Ultimately, on 14 April 2025, WBD decided to keep the TVN unit.

=== Latin America ===
In June 2016, Discovery acquired a 27.5% stake in Bethia Comunicaciones S.A., a division of Chilean conglomerate Bethia that owns Red Televisiva Megavisión S.A., a company which in turn owns both the private television network Mega and a 70% stake in the anime-, Korean drama- and K-pop-focused cable television channel ETC (which is co-owned with its creator, who is businessman and television executive Hernán Schmidt Fuentes). As a result, Bethia acquired 72.5% of the company.

Redknot, a joint venture with Canadian animation studio Nelvana, launched on 12 February 2019.

In 2022, Discovery merged with WarnerMedia, forming Warner Bros. Discovery Latin America, with the new entity being responsible for the assets in Latin America and Brazil.

=== Asia-Pacific ===
As part of its acquisition of Scripps Networks Interactive in 2018, Discovery added Asian Food Network (which SNI had acquired from the co-founders Hian Goh and Maria Brown in 2013) to its Asian portfolio.

On 7 September 2020, MediaWorks New Zealand Limited announced that Discovery would be purchasing the television arm of their business including Three, Bravo, The Edge TV, Breeze TV, streaming service ThreeNow, and current affairs service Newshub. MediaWorks said in a statement that the transaction was subject to "a number of pre-completion approvals" but was expected to completed by the end of the year. . The sale was finalized in December 2020, with the new entity being rebranded as Discovery New Zealand.

On 27 April 2021, Discovery Inc. confirmed that it would be restructuring its business operations in Australia and New Zealand with the goal of incorporating Three, Bravo and Newshub into a single trans-Tasman organization. Discovery also announced that this new trans-Tasman organization would be headed by two general managers, the Sydney–based Rebecca Kent and Glen Kyne in Auckland. Discovery had also separately acquired MediaWorks' TopTV operations in 2019. In mid-May 2021, Newshub closed its Dunedin office as part of a restructuring of Discovery's business operations in Australia and New Zealand. Following the closure of the Dunedin newsroom, the network's South Island operations will consist of its Christchurch–based bureau and freelancers.

In April 2022, WarnerMedia Entertainment Networks Asia Pacific merged with Discovery Asia-Pacific and consequently been announced that Discovery+ which currently available in India and the Philippines would be merged with HBO Go which available in Hong Kong, Taiwan and Southeast Asian countries, that carried several content from HBO Max, to form simply Max on 19 November 2024.

In late July 2025, Warner Bros. Discovery announced it would sell its New Zealand assets to local television network Sky Network Television, effective 1 August 2025. Sky also confirmed that Discovery NZ would be rebranded as Sky Free.

== Animal Planet ==
=== Current channels ===
- The Americas
  - Latin America
  - Brazil
  - Caribbean
- Asia-Pacific
  - Asia
  - Australia and New Zealand
  - India
- EMEA
  - Germany
  - Netherlands
  - Nordics
  - Pan-EMEA
  - Poland

=== Former channels ===
- The Americas
  - Canada (10%)
- EMEA
  - Russia

== Boomerang ==
=== Current channels ===
- The Americas
  - Canada (licensed to Corus Entertainment)
- Asia-Pacific
  - Australia
- EMEA
  - Italy
  - Francophone
  - United Kingdom, Ireland & Malta

=== Former channels ===
- The Americas
  - Latin America
- Asia-Pacific
  - India
  - South Korea
  - Southeast Asia
- EMEA
  - Central and Eastern Europe
  - Germany
  - Middle East & Africa
  - Nordics
  - Portugal
  - Spain
  - Turkey

== Cartoon Network ==
=== Current channels ===
- The Americas
  - Canada (licensed to Corus Entertainment)
  - Latin America
- Asia-Pacific
  - Australia & New Zealand
  - India
  - Japan
  - Pakistan
  - Philippines
  - Southeast Asia
  - South Korea
  - Taiwan
- EMEA
  - Arab World (Hindi)
  - Central and Eastern Europe
  - Italy
  - Middle East & Africa
  - Turkey
  - UK & Ireland
  - Western Europe

=== Former channels ===
- EMEA
  - Merged into Western Europe
    - Francophone
    - Germanic
    - Netherlands and Flanders
    - Nordics
    - Portuguese
  - Merged into CEE
    - CIS and Southeastern Europe
    - Poland
  - Israel (television block)
  - Spain

== Cartoonito ==
=== Current channels ===
- The Americas
  - Latin America
- Asia-Pacific
  - South Korea
  - Southeast Asia
- EMEA
  - Central and Eastern Europe
  - Francophone
  - Italy (Free to air)
  - Middle East & Africa
  - UK & Ireland
  - Western Europe

=== Former channels ===
- Australia & New Zealand (Block on Boomerang)
- EMEA
  - Merged into Western Europe
    - Nordics
    - Portuguese
  - Spain
  - Turkey (Merged into MENA)

== CNN International ==
- EMEA
  - CNN Arabic
- Asia-Pacific
  - CNN International South Asia
  - CNN-News18 (joint venture with Network 18)
- Licensed
  - A2 CNN (G2 Media)
  - Antena 3 CNN (Intact Media Group)
  - CNN Brazil (Novus Media)
  - CNN Chile (Carey Media Holdings)
  - CNN Indonesia (Trans Media)
  - CNN Portugal (Media Capital)
  - CNN Prima News (FTV Prima)
  - CNN Türk (Demirören Group)
  - N1 (United Group)

== Discovery Channel ==
- The Americas
  - Canada (licensed to Rogers Sports & Media)
  - Latin America
- Asia-Pacific
  - Discovery Asia
  - Australia and New Zealand
  - India
  - Southeast Asia
- EMEA
  - Africa and Central Europe
  - Denmark
  - Finland
  - Belgium
  - France
  - Germany
  - Hungary
  - Italy
  - MENA
  - Netherlands
  - Norway
  - Portugal
  - Poland
  - CIS
  - Spain
  - Sweden
  - UK & Ireland

== DMAX ==
- EMEA
  - Germany
  - Italy
  - Middle East and Africa
  - Spain
  - Turkey
  - UK & Ireland
- Asia-Pacific
  - Asia
  - Australia

== Food Network ==
- The Americas
  - Canada (licensed to Rogers Sports & Media)
  - Latin America
- Asia Pacific
  - Asia
  - Asian Food Network
- EMEA
  - Italy
  - UK and Ireland
  - Poland

== HGTV ==
=== Current channels ===
- The Americas
  - Canada (licensed to Rogers Sports & Media)
  - Latin America
- Asia-Pacific
  - Australia
  - Indonesia
  - Malaysia
  - Hong Kong
  - Philippines
  - New Zealand
  - Singapore
  - Taiwan
  - Vietnam
- EMEA
  - Germany
  - Italy
  - MENA
  - Netherlands
  - Poland
  - Romania
  - South Africa

=== Former channels ===
- EMEA
  - UK and Ireland

== Investigation Discovery ==
- The Americas
  - Canada (licensed to Rogers Sports & Media)
  - Latin America
- Asia-Pacific
  - India
- EMEA
  - Middle East & Africa
  - Central and Eastern Europe
  - France
  - Netherlands and Flanders
  - Pan-European
  - Portugal
  - Sweden

== Science Channel ==
=== Current channels ===
- The Americas
  - Discovery Science Latin America
- Asia-Pacific
  - Discovery Science Asia
  - Discovery Science India

=== Former channels ===
- The Americas
  - Discovery Science Canada (10% with CTV Specialty Television)
- EMEA
  - Central Europe
  - MENA & SS Africa
  - Poland
  - Turkey

== TLC ==
- The Americas
  - Canada
  - Latin America
- Asia-Pacific
  - Asia
  - Australia and New Zealand
  - India
- EMEA
  - France
  - Germany
  - MENA
  - Netherlands
  - Norway
  - Poland
  - Sweden
  - Turkey
  - UK and Ireland

== TNT Sports ==
- The Americas
  - TNT Sports (Argentina)
    - TNT Sports Premium (Argentina)
  - TNT Sports (Brazil)
    - Estádio TNT Sports
  - TNT Sports (Chile)
    - TNT Sports Premium (Chile)
  - TNT Sports (Mexico)
- Asia-Pacific
  - TNT Sports (Asia)
  - TNT Sports (Australia)
  - TNT Sports (India)
- EMEA
  - TNT Sports (United Kingdom) (50% with BT Group)
    - TNT Sports 1
    - TNT Sports 2
    - TNT Sports 3
    - TNT Sports 4
    - TNT Sports Box Office
  - TNT Sports (France)

== Travel Channel ==
=== Current channels ===
- The Americas
  - DTour Canada (licensed to Corus Entertainment)
- Asia-Pacific
  - Asia
  - Australia
  - India
- EMEA
  - Germany
  - MENA & SS Africa
  - Sweden
  - Turkey
  - Poland

=== Former channels ===
- Asia-Pacific
  - New Zealand
- EMEA
  - Netherlands
  - UK and Ireland

== Warner TV ==
=== Current channels ===
- The Americas
  - Warner Channel
  - TNT Latin America
  - TNT Novelas
  - TNT Series
  - TCM Latin America
- Asia-Pacific
  - Asia
- EMEA
  - TNT Africa
  - Czechia (free TV)
  - France
    - Warner TV Next
  - Germany channels
    - WarnerTV Film
    - WarnerTV Serie
    - WarnerTV Comedy
  - Poland
  - Romania
  - Spain
    - Warner TV
  - TCM Cinéma
  - TCM MENA

=== Former channels ===
- The Americas
  - True TV Canada
  - TruTV Latin America
- Asia-Pacific
  - TruTV Asia
  - WB Channel (India)
  - Turner Classic Movies Asia
  - Turner Classic Movies India
- EMEA
  - TruTV UK and Ireland (licensed to Sony Pictures Television)
  - TNT Nordics
  - TCM Movies
  - Warner TV Italy

== Other networks ==
=== Current channels ===
- Canada
  - Adult Swim Canada (licensed to Corus Entertainment)
- Latin America
  - Adult Swim Latin America
  - Discovery Home & Health
  - Discovery Kids Latin America
    - Redknot (joint venture with Nelvana)
  - Discovery Theater
  - Discovery World
  - Discovery Turbo Latin America
  - Golf Channel Latin America
  - HTV
  - Raze
  - Space
  - Tooncast
- Asia-Pacific
  - DMAX Southeast Asia
  - EVE
  - JTBC (5.72%)
  - Warner Bros. Discovery India
    - Discovery Kids India
    - Discovery Tamil
    - Discovery Turbo India
    - Pogo
  - Discovery Japan
    - TABI Channel
    - MONDO TV
  - World Heritage Channel
- EMEA
  - Boing
    - Africa
    - Italy (49% with MFE - MediaForEurope)
    - Spain (50% with MFE - MediaForEurope)
  - Discovery Turbo (UK)
  - Discovery Life Poland
  - Fatafeat
  - Quest
    - Quest Red
  - Really
  - Tele 5
  - Warner Bros. Discovery Italy
    - Frisbee
    - Giallo
    - K2
    - Motor Trend
    - Nove
    - Real Time
  - Warner Bros. Discovery Nordics
    - Warner Bros. Discovery Denmark
      - 6'eren
      - Canal 9
      - Kanal 4
      - Kanal 5 (Denmark)
    - Warner Bros. Discovery Finland
      - TV5
      - Kutonen
      - Frii
    - Warner Bros. Discovery Norway
      - TVNorge
      - FEM
      - Rex
      - VOX
    - Warner Bros. Discovery Sweden
      - Kanal 9
      - Kanal 11
      - Kanal 5 (Sweden)
  - Warner Bros. Discovery Poland
    - Discovery Historia
    - Metro
    - DTX

=== Former channels ===
- Latin America
  - Discovery Civilization Latin America
  - I.Sat
  - Infinito
  - Glitz
  - MuchMusic Latin America
  - TBS Latin America
- EMEA
  - Boing France
- Asia-Pacific
  - 9Rush (joint venture with Nine Entertainment Co.)
  - Adult Swim (Australia block)
  - Boom Thailand (licensed to MVTV)
