= Fine Living (European TV channel) =

- Broadcast area: Europe

Programming
- Picture format: 1080i HDTV (downscaled to 16:9 576i for the SDTV feed)

Ownership
- Owner: Discovery, Inc. (2018-2020); Scripps Networks Interactive (2010-2018)
- Parent: Discovery EMEA
- Sister channels: Animal Planet; Discovery; Discovery HD; Discovery Home & Health; Discovery Historia; Discovery History; Discovery MAX; Discovery Shed; Discovery Science; Discovery Turbo; Discovery World; DMAX Germany, Austria, Switzerland & Liechtenstein; DMAX United Kingdom & Ireland; Eurosport 1 Eurosport 2 Food Network; HGTV UK and Ireland; Investigation Discovery; Quest; Quest Red; Real Time Italy; TLC Netherlands; TLC Poland; TLC Romania; TLC UK and Ireland; Travel Channel; Really; Good Food

History
- Launched: 1 April 2010; 15 years ago
- Replaced: Zone Club
- Closed: 31 December 2020; 5 years ago

Links
- Website: www.finelivingnetwork.com

Fine Living (Sometimes called Fine Living Network or FLN) was a European television channel, initially owned and operated by Scripps Networks Interactive and later by Discovery Inc., from 2018 onwards. It broadcast from 1 April 2010 to 31 December 2020. It featured documentaries, reality, and how-to shows related to home, cooking, travel, lifestyle and health.

== History ==
The channel was operated by Scripps Networks Interactive in a joint venture with Chello Zone from the launch till 2018 when Discovery, Inc. acquired Scripps Networks Interactive.

Fine Living HD launched in Europe on 1 September 2015.

Fine Living ceased broadcasting in the Netherlands and Flanders on 31 January 2019. Content from former Scripps television channels Travel Channel, Fine Living and Food Network has been integrated into the programming of Discovery, TLC and Investigation Discovery in the Benelux.

On 31 December 2020, it was announced that the television channel has been dissolved following a bankruptcy proceeding due to accumulated debt of over €30 million, and was replaced by the pan-European version of HGTV.

== Programming ==
Programs on Fine Living were of factual entertainment and originated from the categories of Design & Décor, Food & Drink and Travel & Adventure.

=== All TV shows ===
- 10 Grand in Your Hand
- Adam Richman's Best Sandwich in America
- Amazing Water Homes
- America's Most Desperate Kitchens
- Beachfront Bargain Hunt
- Brian Boitano Project
- Brian Boitano's Italian Adventure
- Candice Tells All
- Caribbean Life
- Color Splash
- Cool Pools
- Cousins on Call
- Curb Appeal
- Daryl's Restoration Over-Hall
- Dear Genevieve
- Desperate Landscapes
- Diners, Drive-Ins and Dives
- Drop 5 lbs with Good Housekeeping
- Extreme Homes
- Fixer Upper
- Flea Market Flip
- Flip or Flop
- Giada at Home
- Giada Entertains
- Giada in Paradise
- Giada's Weekend Getaways
- Going Yard
- Hawaii Life
- Healthy Appetite with Ellie Krieger
- Healthy Gourmet
- High Low Project
- House Hunters
- The Insider's List
- Island Life
- The Jennie Garth Project
- Junk Gypsies
- Kitchen Cousins (John Colaneri & Anthony Carrino)
- Kitchen Impossible
- Million Dollar Closets
- Million Dollar Rooms
- Model: NYC
- Mom Caves
- My First Renovation
- Platinum Weddings
- Rehab Addict
- Restoration SOS Virginia
- Selling LA
- Texas Flip N Move

== See also ==
- Fine Living Network
- Fine Living (Italian TV channel)
