= Eurosport 2 =

Pan-European television sports network

- Country: France; United Kingdom
- Broadcast area: Europe; United States; Latin America the Caribbean
- Network: Eurosport
- Headquarters: Issy-les-Moulineaux, Paris

Programming
- Languages: English, Swedish, French, Italian, German, Greek, Hungarian, Bulgarian, Russian, Polish, Romanian, Serbian, Croatian, Turkish, Czech, Slovak, Portuguese, Albanian, Dutch, Spanish (specific events), Danish, Finnish, Norwegian
- Picture format: 2160p UHDTV (downscaled to 1080i and 576i for the HDTV and SDTV feeds respectively)

Ownership
- Owner: TNT Sports (Skydance Corporation)
- Parent: TNT Sports International
- Sister channels: List: Eurosport 1; Animal Planet; Discovery; Discovery HD; Discovery Historia; Discovery History; DMAX Spain; Discovery Science; DMAX Germany, Austria, Switzerland & Liechtenstein; Food Network; Investigation Discovery; Real Time Italy; TLC Netherlands; TLC Poland; Travel Channel

History
- Launched: 10 January 2005; 21 years ago
- Replaced: Eurosport DK (Denmark); Eurosport News (some countries)
- Closed: 9 March 2022; 4 years ago (Russia) 28 February 2025; 20 months ago (United Kingdom) 1 July 2026; 4 months ago (Belarus)
- Replaced by: Eurosport DK (Denmark); Eurosport Norge (Norway)

Links
- Website: tntsports.co.uk

Availability

Terrestrial
- See separate section

Streaming media
- Discovery+: Watch live (subscription required)
- DAZN: Watch live (Italy only)
- Ziggo GO: Watch live (Netherlands only)

Eurosport 2 is a sports television channel and a sister channel to Eurosport 1. Both are part of the Eurosport network which is a unit of Skydance Corporation. Several different versions of the channel exist across Europe, with different sports rights across different markets. Eurosport 2 had an audience of 87 million viewers in 2019—an increase in size of one million.

== Launch ==
Eurosport 2 logo used from 2011 to 2015

Eurosport 2 launched on 10 January 2005, replacing Eurosport News in some countries including the United Kingdom. It is currently available in 50 million homes and 47 countries, broadcasting in 18 different languages English, Swedish, French, Italian, German, Greek, Hungarian, Russian, Bulgarian, Polish, Portuguese, Romanian, Serbian, Turkish, Czech, Dutch, Spanish and Danish.

On 9 March 2022, Discovery Inc. closed Eurosport 2 in Russia due to Russia's invasion of Ukraine.

At the beginning of July 2026, the channel was closed in Belarus along with Discovery Channel and Eurosport 1 channels and theme package Discovery on the ZALA IPTV.

== Programming ==
Eurosport 2 considers itself "a new-generation sports channel", and is dedicated to team sports and in particular 'alternative' and niche sports including European basketball, National Lacrosse League, Twenty20 cricket, AFL Aussie Rules, surfing and the Handball Champions League, amongst others.

On 2 July 2010, the Arena Football League announced that Eurosport 2 would show matches that the NFL Network broadcast in the United States on a tape delay for the rest of the season, as well as coverage of ArenaBowl XXIII. The deal also includes rights for the entire 2011 season to be broadcast on the channel.

== Eurosport 2 HD ==
Logo of Eurosport 2 HD

Eurosport 2 HD, a high-definition version of the channel is also available. In central and northern Europe, it carries some exclusive programming such as Bundesliga football from Germany, WWE wrestling shows and live Australian Rules Football matches, which are not available on other versions due to local networks holding the rights.

== Eurosport DK ==
Eurosport DK was a Danish television channel owned by Discovery Networks Northern Europe. The channel replaced Canal 8 Sport and Eurosport 2 in Denmark on 1 July 2015.

On 28 May 2015, Discovery Networks Northern Europe announced that they would merge Canal 8 Sport and Eurosport 2 into Eurosport DK in Denmark, broadcasting football from Danish Superliga, the Bundesliga, Major League Soccer, Capital One Cup, UEFA Euro 2016 qualifying, Tennis from ATP Tour, WTA Tour and 3 Grand Slams, Cycling from UCI World Tour, Winter sport, Motorsports.

On 15 February 2016, the channel was replaced by Eurosport 2.

== Eurosport Norge ==
Eurosport Norge is a Norwegian television channel that replaced Eurosport 2 on several cable operators on 3 September 2015. It is owned by Discovery Networks Norway and broadcasts Norwegian eliteserien and other Eurosport programming.

== English Language Bundesliga commentators ==
Name
(England) Andreas Evagora
(England) Tony Jeffers
(England) Angus Torode
(Wales) Ben Harris
(England) Elliot Richardson
(Germany) Andreas Jörger
(Scotland) Stuart Telford
(Republic of Ireland) Mark Rodden

== Availability ==
=== Terrestrial ===
- Lattelecom (Latvia): Channel 51
- Polsat Box (Poland): Channel 113

=== Satellite ===
- Allente (Denmark, Finland, Norway, Sweden)
- A1 Bulgaria (Bulgaria): Channel 145
- Antik Sat (Czech Republic): Channel 43
- Bulsatcom (Bulgaria): Channel 19
- Canal+: Channel 64
- Canal+ Caraïbes (Overseas France): Channel 125
- DigitAlb (Albania): Channel
- Digiturk (Turkey): Channel 92
- Direct One (Hungary): Channel 123
- D-Smart (Turkey): Channel 76
- Focus Sat (Czech Republic): Channel 68
- Home 3 (Estonia, Lithuania, Latvia)
- MEO (Portugal): Channel 38
- Movistar Plus+ (Spain): Channel 67 (SD)
- M:Sat TV (Serbia): Channel 40
- NOS (Portugal): Channel 131
- Nova (Greece): Channel 113
- Neosat (Bulgaria)
- Orange Polska (Poland): Channel 112
- Platforma Canal+ (Poland): Channel 114
- Polsat Box (Poland): Channel 15
- Sky Italia (Italy): 211
- Telly (Czech Republic): Channel 30
- Tivibu (Turkey): Channel 72
- Telemach (Slovenia)
- Total TV (Bosnia and Herzegovina): Channel 181
- Total TV (Croatia): Channel 121
- Total TV (North Macedonia): Channel 171
- Total TV (Serbia): Channel 171
- T-Home (Hungary): Channel 49
- Viasat Ukraine (Ukraine)
- Vivacom (Bulgaria): Channel 215 (SD)

=== Cable ===
- Caiway (Netherlands): Channel 137 (HD)
- Com Hem (Sweden): Channel 103
- DELTA (Netherlands): Channel 151 (SD)
- Global Destiny (Philippines): Channel 36
- Digi TV (Hungary): Channel 37
- Hot (Israel): Channel 59
- Kabel Deutschland (Germany): Channel 373
- Kabel Noord (Netherlands): Channel 301 (HD)
- Lattelecom (Latvia): Channel 402
- Naxoo (Switzerland): Channel 81
- Numericable (France): Channel 152
- RCS&RDS (Romania): Channel 30
- Serbia Broadband: Channel 268 and Channel 137 (HD)
- Telenet (Flanders): Channel 211
- T-Home (Hungary): Channel 38
- T-Home Digital (Hungary): Channel S38
- UPC Digital (Hungary): Channel 46
- UPC Poland (Poland): Channel 564
- UPC Poland: Channel 566 and Channel 567 (HD)
- UPC Romania: Channel 211
- Vodafone TV (Spain): Channel 251 (HD)
- Ziggo (Netherlands): Channel 411 (HD)
- ZON TV (Portugal): Channel 28 (no coverage in Mirandela)
- ArtMotion (Kosovo): Channel 81
- IPKO (Kosovo): Channel 217
- DigitAlb (Albania)
- Kujtesa (Kosovo): Channel 145

=== IPTV ===
- Belgacom TV (Belgium): Channel 74 (Dutch) and Channel 85 (French)
- BT TV (United Kingdom): Channel 413 and Channel 436 (HD)
- eir Vision (Ireland): Channel 414 and Channel 428 (HD)
- KPN (Netherlands): Channel 36 (HD)
- MEO (Portugal): Channel 38
- MojaTV (Bosnia and Herzegovina): Channel 35
- Movistar+ (Spain): Channel 62 (HD, SD)
- On Telecoms (Greece): Channel 47
- Open IPTV (Serbia): Channel 562
- Orange TV (Spain): Channel 101 (HD)
- Tele2 (Netherlands): Channel 208 (SD)
- T-Home (Hungary)
- T-Mobile (Netherlands): Channel 132 (HD)
- Tivibu (Turkey): Channel 86
- Vodafone (Portugal): Channel 27
- iNES (Romania)
- Telekom TV (Slovakia): Channel 66
