= Warner Bros. Discovery EMEA =

British television company

Skydance Europe and Africa
- Type: Division
- Predecessors: Warner Bros. Discovery Networks EMEA (1989–2022); Switchover Media (2000–2013); WarnerMedia EMEA (1985–2022)
- Founded: 2 July 1985; 41 years ago in London, England
- Headquarters: Amsterdam, Netherlands; London, England
- Area served: Europe; Sub-Saharan Africa
- Key people: Priya Dogra (president); Andrew Georgiou (president, Sports Europe)
- Owner: Skydance Corporation
- Parent: Skydance Global Content Sales
- Divisions: TVN Warner Bros. Discovery

Skydance Europe and Africa (Eurafrica) is a division of Skydance. The division is responsible for managing the collection of their cable and satellite networks around the Europe, Middle East and Africa regions.

== History ==
=== WarnerMedia EMEA ===
As Turner Broadcasting System Europe

In 1985, Ted Turner launched a European division in London, England, which would reach across the Middle East and African regional feed.

In August 2004, Turner Broadcasting System Europe announced they were planning to transmitter its European entertainment networks in-house starting in January 2006, with them establishing a new broadcasting facility based in Great Marolobough Street in London

In July 2006, Turner Broadcasting System Europe had established its production arm based in London, England to handle its own original content for its global networks worldwide.

Rebranding as WarnerMedia

In 2019, Turner EMEA would be moving to its new headquarters in Old Street, Shoreditch, London. The new headquarters would have more office space, allowing room for the company's European operations to expand, and a brand new custom-built CNN newsroom. The remaining division was later rebranded as WarnerMedia EMEA by 2020.

=== Discovery Networks EMEA ===
It started out with the launch of the Discovery Channel in Europe in 1989. In mid-2007, Discovery Networks Europe was split into two separate branches, Discovery Networks UK and Discovery Networks EMEA, with the following: localised branches Discovery Networks Deutschland, Discovery Networks Benelux, Discovery Networks Nordic, Discovery Networks Italia and Discovery Networks EMEA (which served all other territories). Again in 2011, Discovery Networks Europe was split into two key branches Discovery Networks Western Europe (DNWE) and Discovery Networks CEEMEA (Central & Eastern Europe, Middle East and Africa). DNWE was located in London and the operations in the United Kingdom, Republic of Ireland, Netherlands, Sweden, Denmark, Italy, Norway, Finland, France and Flanders. All other operations in Europe are operated by Discovery Networks CEEMEA in Warsaw.

In November 2014, Discovery Networks Western Europe was split into Discovery Networks Northern Europe and Discovery Networks Southern Europe. Its previous Discovery Networks Western Europe served 30 countries including the United Kingdom, Ireland, Iceland, Denmark, Sweden, Norway, France, the Netherlands and other territories, comprising 18 brands.

Between 2014 and 2016 Discovery Networks EMEA consisted of the following branches: Northern Europe, CEEMEA, Southern Europe.

From late 2016 all localised operations fall under the umbrella of Discovery EMEA with headquarters in Amsterdam and London, and local offices in among other Milan and Warsaw.

Discovery halted all broadcasts of its 15 linear channels to Russia through the Media Alliance partnership on 9 March 2022 in response to the Russian invasion of Ukraine.

=== Merger as Warner Bros. Discovery EMEA ===
Discovery EMEA were merged into WarnerMedia, forming Warner Bros. Discovery EMEA in 2022.

== TV channels ==
- Animal Planet
  - CIS
  - Germany
  - Netherlands & Flanders
  - Poland
  - Northern Europe
  - UK & Ireland
- Boing
  - Africa
  - Italy (49%)
  - Spain (50%)
- Boomerang
  - Italy
  - France
  - UK, Ireland & Malta
- Cartoon Network
  - Africa
  - Italy
  - Central and Eastern Europe
  - UK, Ireland & Malta
  - Western Europe
- Cartoonito
  - Africa
  - France
  - Italy (free-to-air channel with Mediaset)
  - Central and Eastern Europe
  - UK, Ireland & Malta
  - Western Europe
- CNN US (distribution)
- CNN
  - Albania (A2 CNN)
  - Balkans
  - Czech Republic
  - Portugal
  - Romania
- Discovery Channel
  - Denmark
  - Flanders
  - Finland
  - France
  - Germany
  - Hungary
  - Italy
  - Netherlands
  - Norway
  - Poland
  - Portugal
  - Romania
  - Spain
  - Sweden
  - UK & Ireland
- Discovery Turbo
  - Italy
  - UK & Ireland
- DMAX
  - Germany
  - Italy
  - Spain
  - UK
- Food Network
  - Italy
  - Poland
  - Portugal
  - UK & Ireland
- HGTV
  - Germany
  - Italy
  - Netherlands
    - Flanders
    - Portugal
  - Poland
  - Romania
- HLN (distribution)
- Investigation Discovery
  - CIS
  - Denmark
  - France
  - Italy
  - Netherlands
  - Norway
  - Poland
  - Portugal
  - Sweden
- Kanal 5
  - Denmark
  - Sweden
- TLC
  - Denmark
  - Finland
  - France
  - Germany
  - Netherlands
  - Norway
  - Poland
  - Portugal
  - Romania
  - Sweden
  - UK & Ireland
- Travel Channel
  - Poland
  - Spain
  - Sweden
- Warner TV
  - Africa and MENA
    - TCM MENA
    - TNT Africa
    - Toonami Africa
  - France, Belgium, Switzerland and French-speaking territories
    - TCM Cinéma
    - Next
  - Czechia
  - Germany, Austria and Switzerland
    - Film
    - Serie
    - Comedy
  - Poland
  - Romania
  - Spain
    - TCM Spain

=== Regional Europe ===
- 6'eren (Denmark)
- Canal 9 (Denmark)
- Discovery History (UK and Ireland)
- Discovery Science (Poland)
- Discovery Showcase (Turkey)
- DTX (Poland)
- Fatafeat (MENA)
- FEM (Norway)
- Frii (Finland)
- Frisbee (Italy)
- Giallo (Italy)
- K2 (Italy)
- Kanal 4 (Denmark)
- Kanal 9 (Sweden)
- Kanal 11 (Sweden)
- Kutonen (Finland)
- Nove (Italy)
- Quest (UK & Ireland)
- Quest Red (UK & Ireland)
- Real Time (Italy)
- Really (UK & Ireland)
- REX (Norway)
- Tele 5 (Germany)
- TV5 (Finland)
- TVNorge (Norway)
- VOX (Norway)

=== Defunct channels ===
- Cartoon Network (Spain)
- Cartoon Network (Poland) – replaced by Cartoon Network (CEE) and RSEE on September 18, 2024
- Cartoon Network RSEE – replaced by Cartoon Network (CEE) and Cartoon Network (Poland) on September 18, 2024
- Boing (France) – replaced by Cartoonito on April 3, 2023
- Cartoon Network+ CEE replaced by Cartoon Network+ Europe and Cartoon Network+ Nordic
- Boomerang (Spain) – replaced by Cartoonito on September 1, 2011
- Boomerang Germany, Austria & Switzerland – replaced by Boomerang CEE
- Cartoon Network Too – replaced by Cartoon Network +1
- Cartoon Network Arabic +2
- Cartoonito (Spain)
- Discovery Family (France)
- Discovery Science
- Fine Living
- GXT
- TNT Classic Movies – replaced by Turner Classic Movies
- Toonami (UK & Ireland) – formerly CNX
- Discovery Shed
- Discovery Home & Health (UK & Ireland)
- DKids (MENA)
- Eurosport DK – replaced by Eurosport 2
- Nuts TV
- TCM (North European)
- TCM 2 – replaced by Turner Classic Movies +1
- Turner Classic Movies CEE – replaced by TNT Romania and Poland
- TruTV (UK and Ireland) – acquired by Sony Pictures Television on 16 February 2017
- Discovery Travel & Living
- Discovery World
- TCM (UK & Ireland)
- Warner TV (Italy) – replaced by Discovery (Italy)
- Motor Trend (Italy) – replaced by Discovery Turbo (Italy)
- HGTV (UK & Ireland)
- Boomerang+1 (Italy)
- Cartoon Network+1 (Italy)

== United Kingdom ==
Discovery Networks UK was a branch of Discovery Networks responsible for overseeing Discovery Networks Europe's channels in the United Kingdom and in the Republic of Ireland. As of autumn 2011, Discovery Networks UK is now operated by Discovery Networks Western Europe.

Discovery Networks UK started out with the launch of the Discovery Channel in Europe in 1989 and was for a long time a part of Discovery Networks Europe (DNE). In early 2007, DNE was split into two separate branches, Discovery Networks UK and Discovery Network EMEA, both headquartered in London. As of 2011 Discovery Networks Europe has merged its operations in the UK, Nordic region and other parts of Western Europe to form Discovery Networks Western Europe.

In the UK the Discovery Channel has been the number one factual channel throughout its 20-year history. It has a 47 percent share of the PAYTV factual market (Source BARB/TechEdge).

=== Current operations ===
In 2007, Discovery Networks Europe decided to localize its networks across Europe. This resulted in the establishment of Discovery Discovery Networks Deutschland, Discovery Networks Benelux, Discovery Networks Nordic, Discovery Networks UK and Discovery Networks Italia and Discovery Networks EMEA (which served all other territories). As of 2011, operations in the United Kingdom, Germany, Italy, Sweden, Denmark, Norway, Finland, France and Flanders are operated by Discovery Networks Western Europe. All other operations in Europe are operated by Discovery Networks CEEMEA in Warsaw.

== Nordic ==
Discovery Communications Nordic (formerly Discovery Networks Nordic and SBS Discovery Media) was a branch of Discovery Networks Northern Europe, a part of Warner Bros. Discovery EMEA. Headquartered in Copenhagen, Denmark, the company represents Warner Bros. Discovery operations in Denmark, Finland, Norway and Sweden.

=== History ===
SBS Broadcasting Group's operations in the Nordics

Discovery Networks Nordic

Discovery Networks Nordic previously held responsibility for overseeing Discovery Networks brands in Denmark, Sweden, Norway and Finland with headquarters in Copenhagen. Discovery Networks Nordic's key operations are the localization of Discovery Channel and the pan-Nordic Animal Planet. Discovery Networks Nordic also promotes other brands operated by Discovery Networks Europe.

Discovery acquires SBS in Nordics

On 9 April 2013 Discovery's acquisition of SBS Nordic from German media group ProSiebenSat.1 was finalised. At the time of the merger, SBS had been a major commercial broadcaster in Scandinavia for two decades. The combined viewing shares made it the second largest commercial television group in Norway and the third largest in Denmark.

After acquisition

SBS Discovery's radio stations were later sold to Bauer Media Group.

== Benelux ==
Discovery Benelux was a branch of Discovery Inc. that was responsible for channels in the Netherlands and Belgium. Founded on 17 September 1997, in Amsterdam, Netherlands Discovery Benelux operated Discovery Netherlands, Discovery Flanders, Animal Planet, TLC, Eurosport 1, Eurosport 2 and Investigation Discovery in the region with local advertising, sponsorship, programming and the use of the local language either dubbed or subtitled. Discovery Benelux also use existing services from Discovery International: Discovery Science.

=== History ===
In 2007, Discovery Networks Europe decided to localize its networks across Europe. This resulted in the establishment of Discovery Networks Deutschland, Discovery Networks Benelux, Discovery Networks Nordic, Discovery Networks UK & Ireland, Discovery Networks Italia and Discovery Networks EMEA (which served all other territories). As of 2011, localized operations in the United Kingdom & Republic of Ireland, Germany, Italy, Nordic countries (Sweden, Denmark, Norway & Finland), France and Benelux (Netherlands & Flanders) fall under Discovery Networks Western Europe. All other operations in Europe are operated by Discovery Networks CEEMEA in Warsaw.

In November 2014, Discovery Networks Western Europe was split into Discovery Networks Northern Europe and Discovery Networks Southern Europe.

Travel Channel, Fine Living and Food Network closed in the Netherlands and Flanders on 31 January 2019. Content from these former Scripps television channels has been integrated into the programming of Discovery, TLC and Investigation Discovery in the Benelux.

In 2019 Discovery Benelux launched Dplay, a video on demand streaming service with content of Discovery, TLC and Investigation Discovery. On 5 January 2021, Discovery+ replaced Dplay.

== Germany ==
Warner Bros. Discovery Deutschland (formerly Turner Broadcasting System Deutschland, GmbH; WarnerMedia System Deutschland, GmbH) is the branch of Warner Bros. Discovery EMEA responsible for the company's brands in Germany, Austria and German-speaking parts of Switzerland. Its key operations are the free-to-air DMAX, Tele 5, Discovery Channel, Animal Planet and Discovery HD. Previously, Discovery Networks Deutschland operated Discovery Geschichte a history documentary channel. It was headquartered in Munich. Hannes Heyelmann was the general manager and vice president of the company.

Like other Discovery channels in Europe. Discovery Networks Deutschland utilize existing productions from Discovery Networks Europe and Discovery Communications.

In 2007, Discovery Networks Europe decided to localize its networks across Europe. This resulted in the establishment of Discovery Discovery Networks Deutschland, Discovery Networks Benelux, Discovery Networks Nordic, Discovery Networks UK & Ireland and Discovery Networks Italia and Discovery Networks EMEA (which served all other territories). As of 2011, operations in the United Kingdom, Republic of Ireland, Germany, Italy, Sweden, Denmark, Norway, Finland, France and Flanders are operated by Discovery Networks Western Europe. All other operations in Europe are operated by Discovery Networks CEEMEA in Warsaw.

In early 2011, Discovery International restructured its operations in Europe. In February 2011, it established two key branches which resulted in the amalgamation of its localized networks in Europe.

== See also ==
- Skydance Asia-Pacific & MENA
- Skydance Americas
