= Eurosport 1 =

Pan-European television sports network

- Country: France; United Kingdom
- Broadcast area: Europe; India; Poland; United States; Latin America the Caribbean
- Network: Eurosport
- Headquarters: Issy-les-Moulineaux, Paris

Programming
- Language: Various
- Picture format: 2160p UHDTV; 1080i HDTV

Ownership
- Owner: TNT Sports (Skydance Corporation)
- Parent: TNT Sports International
- Sister channels: List: Eurosport 2; Animal Planet; Discovery; Discovery HD; Discovery Historia; Discovery History; DMAX Spain; Discovery Science; DMAX Germany, Austria, Switzerland & Liechtenstein; Food Network; Investigation Discovery; Real Time Italy; TLC Netherlands; TLC Poland; Travel Channel

History
- Launched: 5 February 1989; 37 years ago (original); 22 May 1991; 35 years ago (relaunch)
- Replaced: Screensport (relaunch)
- Closed: 6 May 1991; 35 years ago (original) 9 March 2022; 4 years ago (Russia); 28 February 2025; 20 months ago (United Kingdom) 1 July 2026; 4 months ago (Belarus)
- Replaced by: Sky Sports (original); TNT Sports (United Kingdom)
- Former names: Eurosport (1989–2015); British Eurosport (1999–2015, UK); DSport (2017–2020, India)

Links
- Website: tntsports.co.uk

Availability

Terrestrial
- See separate section

Streaming media
- Eurosport app (Europe and wider region: Watch live (Limited Programming outside Europe)

Eurosport 1 is a television sports network channel which is a division of Eurosport and a subsidiary of Skydance Corporation. Then known as Warner Bros. Discovery, took a 20% minority interest share in December 2012, and became majority shareholder in the Eurosport venture with TF1 in January 2014, taking a 51% share of the company, On 22 July 2015 Discovery agreed to acquire TF1's remaining 49% stake in the venture.

The channel is available in 73 countries, in 21 languages providing viewers with European and international sporting events. Eurosport first launched on European satellites on 5 February 1989. On 13 November 2015 Eurosport changed the name of its main channel to Eurosport 1.

== Sporting events ==
Logo used from 2011 to 2015

Eurosport provides viewers with European and international sporting events, certain events are not available in a particular country due to Eurosport not being the rights holder in that territory.

=== Football ===
- UEFA Nations League (Denmark only)
- European Qualifiers (Denmark only)
  - UEFA Euro 2020 qualifying
  - 2022 FIFA World Cup qualification
- UEFA National Team Friendlies (Denmark only)
- UEFA Women's Champions League (exclude final from 2018 to 2019 season)
- DFB-Pokal (Poland only)
- Hero I-league (Only for Europe and central Asia)
- Ekstraklasa (except Germany and the UK)
- Eliteserien
- Coupe de France (France only)
- CAF African Cup of Nations (only for Ireland, Portugal, Spain, and UK)

=== Basketball ===
- EuroLeague (only for Ireland, Italy, and UK)
- EuroCup (only for Ireland, Italy, Poland, and UK)
- Serie A (Italy only)
- Coppa Italia (Italy only)
- Supercoppa Italiana (Italy only)

=== Motorsport ===
Eurosport Events is the Eurosport group's sporting events management/promotion/production division, which promotes the FIA World Touring Car Championship (WTCC), the FIA European Touring Car Cup and the FIA European Rally Championship. Eurosport broadcasts every WTCC race live and every ERC rally either live or with daily highlights.

Eurosport Events (formerly known as 'KSO Kigema Sports Organisation Ltd') was also the promoter of the Intercontinental Rally Challenge, a rival rallying series to the World Rally Championship. The IRC ceased at the end of the 2012 season, with Eurosport taking over series promotion of the ERC from 2013.

Since 2008, the Eurosport Group has also been broadcasting the annual 24 Hours of Le Mans in full.

Eurosport airs MotoGP, Superbike World Championship and Malaysian Cub Prix in France and Germany, and has Spanish broadcasting rights for NASCAR and IndyCar Series.

On 29 September 2015, Eurosport acquired the Portuguese broadcasting rights for Formula One between 2016 and 2018.

=== Other sports ===
Other sporting events shown on Eurosport include the Dakar Rally, Monte Carlo Rally, athletics events such as World Athletics Championships and the European Athletics Championships, cycling events such as the Tour de France, Giro d'Italia and the Vuelta a España, tennis events including the French Open, Australian Open, Wimbledon (only for Belgium and shared coverage with the BBC in the UK) and the US Open, World Championship Snooker, ICC World Twenty20, ICC Cricket World Cup, ICC Champions Trophy, Sudirman Cup, All England Open Badminton Championships, Australian Football League, basketball events such as Eurocup Basketball and Olympiakos Piraeus home matches in the Greek Basket League (only for Poland), PGA Tour (only for Italy), winter sports, skating and surfing.

Early in the station's history, professional wrestling from both sides of the Atlantic was covered, with the WWF's Superstars of Wrestling as well as New Catch filmed mostly in France by the European Wrestling Federation with some German/Austrian footage by the Catch Wrestling Association and featuring a mixture of British, French and German wrestlers (many of them veterans of coverage on Britain's ITV and France's Antenne 2 and FR3 channels.)

In June 2015, it was announced that Eurosport had secured the pan-European rights (except Russia) to the winter and summer Olympic Games between 2018 and 2024.

== Feeds ==
In Europe, Eurosport 1 is generally available in basic cable and satellite television packages. Since 1999, Eurosport 1 provides various opt-out services providing more relevant sporting content specific to language, advertising and commentary needs. Eurosport offers a stand-alone channel which provides a standardised version of the channel (Eurosport International in English). Alongside this there are also local Eurosport channels in France, United Kingdom, Italy, Germany, Poland, Nordic region, Benelux region, and Asia Pacific. These channels offer greater sporting content with local sporting events, while also utilising the existing pan-European feed. The German version of Eurosport is the only one available free-to-air on European digital satellite television.

Eurosport 1 is currently broadcast in twenty one languages: English, French, German, Italian, Spanish, Portuguese, Dutch, Swedish, Norwegian, Danish, Finnish, Icelandic, Russian, Polish, Czech, Hungarian, Romanian, Bulgarian, Serbian, Greek, Turkish and Persian.

On 9 March 2022, Discovery Inc. closed Eurosport 1 in Russia due to Russia's invasion of Ukraine.

On 28 February 2025, Eurosport 1 also closed in the United Kingdom alongside its sister channel Eurosport 2, with its coverage now airing on TNT Sports.

At the beginning of July 2026, the channel was closed in Belarus along with Discovery Channel and Eurosport 2 channels and theme package Discovery on the ZALA IPTV.

=== HD feed ===
Logo of Eurosport 1 HD

A high-definition simulcast feed of Eurosport started broadcasting on 25 May 2008. The first event covered in HD was the 2008 French Open at Roland Garros. On 13 November 2015 it changed its name to Eurosport 1 HD.

== Availability ==
=== Terrestrial ===
- Boxer (Sweden): Channel 40
- Digitenne (Netherlands): Channel 18 (HD)
- Tet (Latvia): Channel 19
- PlusTV (Finland): Channel 45
- Digital terrestrial television (Germany):
  - Channel 28 (Hanover)
  - Channel 36 (Cologne/Bonn)
  - Channel 46 (Hamburg)
  - Channel 52 (Ruhr area)
  - Channel 56 (Berlin)
  - Channel 60 (Braunschweig)
  - Channel 257 (Italy)
- Polsat Box (Poland): Channel 112

=== Satellite ===
- Astra 19.2°E: 12.227 GHz H / 27500 (German, FTA)
- Allente (Denmark, Finland, Norway, Sweden)
- Alma TV (Kazakhstan): Channel 60
- A1 Bulgaria (Bulgaria): Channel 115
- Antik Sat (Czech Republic): Channel 69
- Big Bang TV (Russia)
- Bulsatcom (Bulgaria): Channel 18
- Canal+ (France): Channel 63
- Canal+ Caraïbes (Overseas France): Channel 124
- DigitAlb (Albania): Channel
- Digiturk (Turkey): Channel 91
- Direct One (Hungary): Channel 122
- D-Smart (Turkey): Channel 75
- Focus Sat (Czech Republic): Channel 67
- HD+ (Germany)
- HD Austria (Austria)
- Home 3 (Estonia, Lithuania, Latvia)
- M7 Deutschland (Germany)
- MEO (Portugal): Channel 38
- Movistar Plus+ (Spain): Channel 66
- M:Sat TV (Serbia): Channel 39
- NOS (Portugal): Channel 37
- Nova (Greece): Channel 112
- Neosat (Bulgaria)
- Orange Polska (Poland): Channel 111
- Otau TV (Kazakhstan)
- Platforma Canal+ (Poland): Channel 113
- Polsat Box (Poland): Channel 120
- Sky Italia (Italy): Channel 210
- Telly (Czech Republic): Channel 29
- Tivibu (Turkey): Channel 71
- Telemach (Slovenia)
- Total TV (Bosnia and Herzegovina): Channel 180
- Total TV (Croatia): Channel 120
- Total TV (North Macedonia): Channel 170
- Total TV (Serbia): Channel 170
- T-Home (Hungary): Channel 47
- Viasat Ukraine (Ukraine)
- Vivacom (Bulgaria): Channel 233 (SD)
- yes (Israel): Channel 61

=== Cable ===
- Cablelink (Philippines): Channel 55 (SD)
- Caiway (Netherlands): Channel 20 (HD)
- Com Hem (Sweden): Channel 10, Channel 102 (HD)
- DELTA (Netherlands): Channel 32 (HD)
- Destiny Cable (Philippines): Channel 214 (Digital)
- Digi TV (Hungary): Channel 33
- Hot (Israel): Channel 49
- Kabel Deutschland (Germany): Channel 402 (SD) / 446 (HD)
- Kabel Noord (Netherlands): Channel 300 (HD)
- Lattelecom: Channel 401, Channel 403 (HD)
- Nacional'nye kabel'nye seti (Russia): Channel 54
- Naxoo: Channel 163 (Deutsch), Channel 248 (Spanish)
- Nowo (Portugal): Channel 77 (HD)
- NOS (Portugal): Channel 37 (HD)
- Numericable (France): Channel 151 (HD)
- RCS&RDS (Romania): Channel 23
- Serbia Broadband: Channel 267, Channel 136 (HD)
- SkyCable (Philippines): Channel 214 (SD), Channel 249 (HD)
- Telenet (Brussels & Wallonia): Channel 49 (HD, French), Channel 621 (HD, English/Dutch)
- Telenet (Flanders): Channel 210 (HD, English/Dutch), Channel 220 (French)
- T-Home (Hungary): Channel 9
- T-Home Digital (Hungary): Channel 26
- UPC Digital (Hungary): Channel 44 (HD), Channel 45
- UPC (Hungary): Channel 13
- UPC Poland (Poland): Channel 564, Channel 565 (HD)
- UPC (Romania): Channel 203 (digital with DVR), Channel 73 (digital)
- Vodafone TV (Spain): Channel 250 (HD)
- Ziggo (Netherlands): Channel 20 (HD), Channel 941 (SD)
- Macau Cable TV: Channel 630
- Türksat Kablo TV (Turkey): Channel S21
- ArtMotion (Kosovo): Channel 81
- Kujtesa (Kosovo): Channel 120
- IPKO (Kosovo): Channel 216 (HD) Channel 234 (SD)
- DigitAlb (Albania)

=== IPTV ===
- A1 TV (Austria): Channel 99 (SD)
- BT TV (United Kingdom): Channel 412, Channel 435 (HD)
- CHT MOD (Taiwan): Channel 216
- Cosmote TV (Greece): Channel 21
- Digi TV (Portugal): Channel 27
- eir Vision (Ireland): Channel 413, Channel 427 (HD)
- iNES (Romania): Channel
- KPN (Netherlands): Channel 35 (HD)
- MEO (Portugal): Channel 38 (HD)
- Moldtelecom (Moldova): Channel 301
- Movistar Plus+ (Spain): Channel 61 (HD, SD)
- On Telecoms (Greece): Channel 46
- Open IPTV (Serbia): Channel 561
- Orange TV (Spain): Channel 100 (HD)
- Singtel TV (Singapore): Channel 112 (HD) (11 August 2015 to 31 July 2018), Channel 116 (1 October 2021 - now)
- SK Telecom B TV (South Korea): Channel 654
- Tele2 (Netherlands): Channel 38
- Telekom Entertain (Germany): Channel 50 (SD)
- T-Home (Hungary)
- T-Mobile (Netherlands): Channel 131 (HD)
- Tivibu (Turkey): Channel 85
- TPG IPTV (Australia): Channel 677
- Vodafone TV (Greece): Channel 551 (HD)
- Vodafone TV (Portugal): Channel 29 (HD)
- myTV Super (Hong Kong): Channel 305
- Xbox 360 (Australia): Channel 511
- MojaTV (Bosnia and Herzegovina): Channel 34
- Telekom TV (Slovakia): Channel 65

=== Online ===
- eurosport.com (Europe and wider region): Watch live, subscription required
- Virgin TV Go (Ireland): Watch live
- Ziggo GO (Netherlands): Watch live
- DAZN (Italy)

== Viewing share ==
Being an international channel, Eurosport's performance differs significantly between countries. The figures below show the channel's share of overall viewing in some countries.

Country	2003	2004	2005	2006	2007	2008	2009	2010	2011	2012	2013	2014	2015	2016	2017	2018
Bulgaria					0.5%	0.6%										
Finland (10+)					0.6%	0.7%	0.7%		1.0%							
France			1.9%	1.4%	1.6%	1.4%			0.6%							
Italy						0.0%										
Germany (3+)				0.9%	1.0%	0.9%	0.9%	0.7%	0.7%	0.7%	0.7%	0.6%	0.7%	0.6%		
Netherlands (6+)	0.8%	0.8%	0.9%	0.9%	0.9%	0.9%	0.8%	0.8%	0.9%	0.9%	0.7%	0.6%	0.7%	0.6%	0.8%	1.0%
Poland (4+)				0.5%	0.5%	0.5%			0.6%	0.8%						
Romania (4+)						0.7%										
Sweden (3-99)				1.6%	1.4%	0.9%			0.6%							
United Kingdom				0.3%	0.2%	0.2%										
