= Discovery Channel (Flanders) =

- Country: Belgium
- Broadcast area: Belgium
- Network: Discovery Benelux

Programming
- Language: Dutch
- Picture format: 1080i HDTV (downscaled to 16:9 576i for the SDTV feed)

Ownership
- Owner: Skydance Corporation
- Sister channels: Discovery HD Showcase; Animal Planet; Investigation Discovery; Discovery World; Discovery Science; TLC; French Discovery

History
- Launched: 1 October 2009; 17 years ago
- Replaced: Discovery Channel Netherlands (2003-2009); Discovery Channel Europe (1989-2003)

Links
- Website: www.discovery.nl/be

Discovery Channel (often referred to as simply Discovery) is a television channel which broadcasts to the Flemish market.

The channel launched on the analogue network of the major Flemish cable company Telenet on October 1, 2009. Prior to that the Dutch version of Discovery had been available digitally in the area. The launch increased Discovery's reach in the Flemish region to 2.4 million households.

The launch of Discovery Channel on Telenet coincided with a major shift in the Telenet analogue offer, which also saw the launch of EXQI Plus and vtmKzoom.

Advertising sales for the channel was initially handled by the established Belgian channel Vitaya. At launch, hope was expressed that the channel would eventually carry original Flemish content. In 2010, Vitaya was bought by Vlaamse Media Maatschappij, owners of the leading TV channel in Flanders. As a result, Discovery Channel Vlaanderen would handle its own ad sale from January 2011. The ad sales were later taken over by SBS Sales Belgium.

Before the launch of Discovery Channel Vlaanderen, Discovery Channel Nederland was available for digital subscribers. A Flemish version of TLC, TLC Vlaanderen, was launched in 2015.
