= Travel Channel International =

Television channel

Travel Channel
- Country: United Kingdom
- Broadcast area: United Kingdom; Ireland; Middle East (excluding Israel); North Africa; Sub-Saharan Africa; Germany; Greece; Poland; Albania; Bulgaria; Georgia; Europe; Romania; Serbia; Balkans; Czech Republic; Slovakia; Asia; Americas; Africa
- Network: Skydance TV

Programming
- Picture format: 1080i HDTV

Ownership
- Owner: Landmark Communications (1994–2004); Travel Channel International Limited (2004–2012); Scripps Networks Interactive (2012–2018); Discovery, Inc. (2018–2022); Warner Bros. Discovery (2022–2026); Skydance Corporation (2026–present)
- Sister channels: List: Animal Planet; Discovery; Discovery Historia; Discovery Science; Discovery World; DMAX Germany, Austria, Switzerland & Liechtenstein; DMAX Spain; Eurosport 1; Eurosport 2; Fine Living; Food Network; Investigation Discovery; Real Time Italy; TLC Poland

History
- Launched: February 1994; 32 years ago
- Closed: 31 October 2015; 11 years ago (New Zealand); 31 January 2019; 7 years ago (Netherlands and Flanders)

Links
- Website: www.travelchanneltv.eu

Availability

Terrestrial
- Zuku TV (Kenya): Channel 712
- DStv (Sub-Saharan Africa): Channel 179

Travel Channel International (stylized as Trvl Channel in Asia and Australia since 2021) is a commercial television channel owned by Skydance Corporation and broadcasting travel-themed programmes in the EMEA regions and Asia Pacific, spanning 21 on-air languages.

The channel was formally operated by Travel Channel International Limited (TCI) and, despite the name, it had no relation with the American television channel of the same name. TCI was acquired by Scripps Networks Interactive, owners of the American channel, in May 2012. In March 2018, Discovery, Inc. acquired Scripps Networks Interactive. Beginning in October 2018, the International service has again diverged from the American network in its programming as the latter network was relaunched as a destination for paranormal programming.

== History ==
Travel Channel was launched by Landmark Communications in Europe in February 1994. In the UK it was seen as a cable-exclusive channel due to it not being carried on the Astra satellite. In 2004, it was sold to the station's chief executive Richard Wolfe and placed under the wings of Travel Channel International Limited (TCI).

A second, sister channel, Travel Channel 2, launched on Sky Digital in the UK and Ireland on 11 February 2008, but closed on 2 March 2009 when the EPG slot was sold to TCM UK. Travel Channel International began to offer their high definition channel, Travel Channel HD, throughout Europe on 15 November 2010 and consequently Asia.

TCI was acquired by Scripps Networks Interactive in May 2012. On 25 March 2013, Travel Channel received refreshed branding, with an overhaul of its scheduling and programming.

On 2 April 2013, the channel was launched on Freesat, a free-to-air satellite television platform in the United Kingdom.

On 31 October 2015, Travel Channel was replaced by Discovery Turbo in New Zealand.

In March 2018, Discovery, Inc. acquired Scripps Networks Interactive.

On 16 January 2019, Travel Channel was removed from Freesat and Freeview in favour of sister channel DMAX in the United Kingdom.

Travel Channel closed in the Netherlands and Flanders on 31 January 2019. Content from former Scripps television channels this channel (Travel Channel), Fine Living and Food Network has been integrated into the programming of Discovery, TLC and Investigation Discovery in the Benelux.

Travel Channel was removed from the Sky EPG on 30 June 2020. It continued to be available on Virgin Media and the Astra 28.2e satellite in the UK and Ireland until 27 August 2020. The channel is still available on some IPTV providers in Ireland and the UK.

On 1 September 2021, Travel Channel in Asia Pacific markets has received a newly refreshed logo stylized as Trvl Channel.

On 9 March 2022 Travel Channel has ceased broadcasting on Russia with Eurosport, TLC (during a HGTV block), DTX, Discovery Science, Investigation Discovery, Discovery Channel, Animal Planet, Cartoon Network and Boomerang.

== Logos ==
Logo from 2000 to 25 March 2013

Logo from 25 March 2013 to 2017

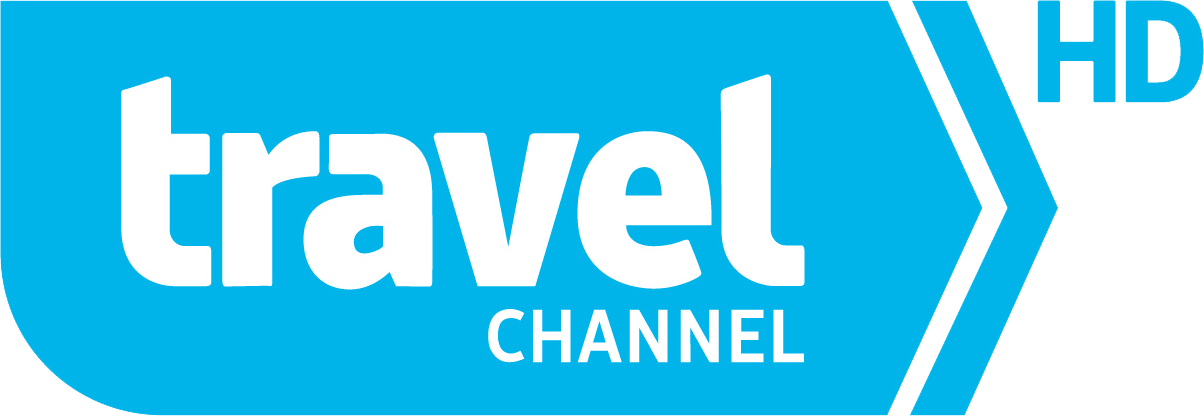
HD logo from 25 March 2013 to 2017

Logo used in Poland since 1 January 2017

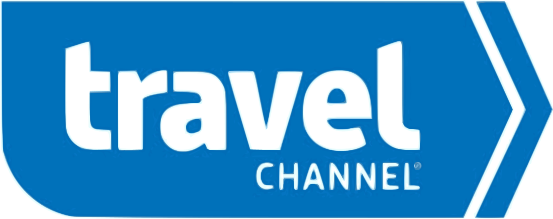
Logo used from April 2016 to August 2020 (UK & Ireland), since 2017 (international)

Logo used in Asia & Australia since 1 September 2021

== Channels ==
- Travel Channel (EMEA, SD/HD simulcast)
- Travel Channel (Poland, SD/HD simulcast)
- Travel Channel (Asia, SD/HD simulcast)
- Travel Channel (India, SD/HD simulcast)
- Travel Channel (Australia, HD)

== Programming ==
Travel Channel's lineup consists of programming involving travel, such as guides to holiday planning, and traditional documentary programming about destinations, cuisine, culture, nature and shopping, along with other types of travel such as backpacking, culinary tourism, ecotourism and luxury tourism.
