= Discovery Channel (disambiguation) =

Discovery Channel is an American multinational cable and satellite pay television channel. It may also refer to the following international regional variants/versions:

- Discovery Channel (Australia and New Zealand)
- Discovery Channel (UK & Ireland)
- Discovery Channel (Canada)
- Discovery Channel (Denmark)
- Discovery Channel (Netherlands)
- Discovery Channel Europe
- Discovery Channel Finland
- Discovery Channel (Flanders)
- Discovery Channel (France)
- Discovery Channel (Germany)
- Discovery Channel (Hungary)
- Discovery Channel (India)
- Discovery Channel (Italy)
- Discovery Channel (Middle East and North Africa)
- Discovery Channel (Norway)
- Discovery Channel (Poland)
- Discovery Channel (Portugal)
- Discovery Channel (Romania)
- Discovery Channel (Russia)
- Discovery Channel (Southeast Asia)
- Discovery Channel (Sweden)

== See also ==
- Discovery Channel Pro Cycling Team, a US-based road bicycle racing team
- Discovery Channel Telescope, at Lowell Observatory
- Discovery Channel Young Scientist Challenge
