= Animal Planet (Dutch TV channel) =

Dutch pay television channel

- Country: Netherlands
- Broadcast area: Netherlands; Belgium
- Network: Discovery Benelux

Programming
- Languages: Dutch; English
- Picture format: 1080i HDTV (downscaled to 16:9 576i for the SDTV feed)

Ownership
- Owner: Skydance Corporation
- Sister channels: Discovery Channel; Discovery Science; Eurosport 1; Eurosport 2; Investigation Discovery; TLC

History
- Launched: 1 July 1997; 29 years ago (Pan-European version of Animal Planet); 16 February 2004; 22 years ago (Dutch version of Animal Planet)
- Replaced: Animal Planet Europe (1997–2004)

Links
- Website: dplay.nl/zenders/animal-planet

Availability

Streaming media
- Ziggo GO: ZiggoGO.tv (Europe only)

Animal Planet is a Dutch pay television channel broadcasting nature-related documentaries in the Netherlands and Flanders. The channel launched as a Pan-European feed on 1 July 1997. It is operated by Discovery Benelux.

== History ==
The Pan-European feed of Animal Planet launched on 1 July 1997 in the Benelux. Initially Dutch subtitles would be added in late 1997. Several programs had subtitles through teletext in January 1998. A few months later on, the teletext subtitles were replaced by DVB subtitles. A localised Dutch feed launched on 16 February 2004.

For its first ten years in existence, the channel used a logo with a globe and an elephant which was also used by its sister channels. On 1 October 2008, the channel switched to a new logo, which had previously been adopted by the US version of the channel, in the United States.

A European high-definition version of the channel, called Animal Planet HD, launched in the Nordic countries on 3 February 2009. In the Netherlands, the high-definition version of the channel launched through Glashart Media on 19 March 2010.

On 4 July 2011, Discovery Networks Benelux launched TLC for the female audience in the Netherlands. Until 1 October 2012, TLC aired between 6:00 pm and 2:00 am on the standard-definition version of Animal Planet, making this channel a time-sharing channel. On 1 October 2012, TLC extended its broadcasting time from 3:00 pm until 2:00 am. The HD simulcast of Animal Planet remains 24 hours.

TLC wasn't available in Belgium. Belgian viewers got the pan-European Animal Planet from then on, except for the satellite viewers. The Dutch feed was used by the Belgian provider of satellite television, TV Vlaanderen Digitaal. During the broadcasting time of TLC, Animal Planet blacked out due to television rights issues.

As of 8 January 2013, Animal Planet SD became 24 hours again.

== Programming ==
- Animal Airport
- Animal Battlegrounds
- America's Cutest...
- Animal Cops: Houston
- Animal Cops: Miami
- Animal Cops: Philadelphia
- Animal Cops: Phoenix
- Animal Cops: South Africa
- Animal Crackers
- Animal Precinct
- Austin Stevens Adventures
- Austin Stevens: Snakemaster
- Baboons with Bill Bailey
- Baby Planet
- Bad Dog!
- Big Cat Diary
- Bondi Vet
- Cats 101
- Cheetah Kingdom
- Chris Humfrey's Wildlife
- Corwin's Quest
- Dark Days in Monkey City
- Deadly Waters
- Dick 'N' Dom Go Wild!
- Dogs 101
- Echo and the Elephants of Amboseli
- Earthquake: Panda Rescue
- Escape to Chimp Eden
- Galapagos
- Gorilla School
- Great Savannah Race
- Great White Appetite
- Great White Invasion
- Great White Shark: Uncaged
- Growing Up...
- How Sharks Hunt
- I'm Alive
- Into the Pride
- Karina: Wild on Safari
- Killer Crocs
- Lions and Giants
- Meerkat Manor
- Monkey Life
- Monster Bug Wars
- Must Love Cats
- Mutant Planet
- My Cat from Hell
- National Parks Australia: Kakadu
- National Parks New Zealand: Fiordland
- Natural World
- Orangutan Island
- Pets 101
- Plants vs. Zombies: The Series (Plak vrs. Zombeck: Shpill Seriesa)
- The Planet's Funniest Animals
- Safari Vet School
- Search for the Knysna elephants
- Shamwari: A Wild Life
- Shark After Dark
- Shark Attack File 3
- Shark Attack Survival Guide
- Shark City
- Shark Family
- Shark Feeding Frenzy
- Shark Tribe
- Sharks of Palau
- Sharks Under Glass
- Speed of Life
- Swarm Chasers
- Talk to the Animals
- Trophy Cats
- Untamed & Uncut
- Venom Hunter with Donald Schultz
- Weird Creatures with Nick Baker
- Whale Wars
- Wild Africa Rescue
- Wild Animal Orphans
- Wildest India
- Wildest Latin America
- Wildlife SOS
- Wild Europe
- World Wild Vet
- Your Very First Puppy
- Your Worst Animal Nightmares
- Up Close and Dangerous
