= Discovery Real Time (French TV channel) =

Discovery Real Time France
- Network: Discovery Networks EMEA

Programming
- Language(s): French

Ownership
- Owner: Discovery Networks EMEA
- Sister channels: Discovery Channel France

History
- Launched: 1 October 2005; 19 years ago
- Closed: 26 January 2010; 15 years ago

Links
- Website: http://www.realtime.fr/

Availability

Terrestrial
- Digital TV on France: Channel 45

Discovery Real Time was a French television channel broadcasting lifestyle programmes about decorating, fashion, cooking and similar topics. It primarily targeted women.

The channel was launched in October 2005 and was the second Discovery network to launch in France. On 3 March 2009 the channel adopted a new logo and a new look designed to be "fresh and stimulating".

After the channel was dropped by leading satellite distributor Canalsat, Discovery decided to close it down. Transmissions ended on 26 January 2010 and was replaced by Discovery HD Showcase.

== Programming ==
The channel used to broadcast both foreign programmes and a few original French productions. Most acquired programmes were originally produced for the American TLC or the British Channel 4. Programmes included:

- 10 Years Younger (Dix ans de moins)
- A Baby Story (Histoire d'une naissance)
- Baby's Room (La chambre de bebe)
- Château Monty
- Colin and Justin on the Estate (La banlieue des deco boys)
- Crimes That Shook the World (Ces crimes qui ont marque le monde)
- Dietbusters (Ex XL)
- Faites comme chez eux
- Flip That House (Mon pari immobilier)
- Grand Designs (Bâtir son reve)
- Groomer Has It (Toilettage Academy)
- In a Fix (Mission renovation)
- It's Me or the Dog (C'est le chien ou moi !)
- La Maison Real Time
- LA Ink
- Le Restaurant
- Miami Ink
- Property Ladder (L'ascenseur immobilier)
- Take Home Handyman (Mon coach brico)
- Tous proprios !
- Trauma: Life in the E.R. (Chroniques des urgences)
- While You Were Out (En votre absence)
