= Warner TV Next =

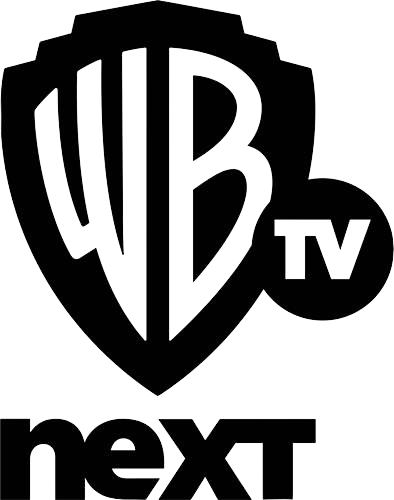
- Country: France
- Broadcast area: Nationwide

Ownership
- Owner: Warner Bros. Discovery International
- Parent: Warner Bros. Discovery EMEA
- Sister channels: Cartoon Network; Cartoonito; TCM Cinéma; Warner TV; TLC; Discovery Channel France; Discovery Investigation; Boomerang

History
- Launched: February 11, 2016; 10 years ago
- Former names: Toonami (2016–23)

Links
- Website: www.warnertvnext.fr

Warner TV Next is a French television channel operated and distributed by Warner Bros. Discovery France, a subsidiary of Warner Bros. Discovery International. It launched on 11 February 2016 as Toonami, based on the Cartoon Network/Adult Swim programming block of the same name in the United States, and was originally targeted at children before shifting to mature audiences in 2020. The channel adopted its current branding on 4 September 2023.

== History ==
On 3 February, it was confirmed by Toonami Squad in an email with Turner that Toonami would be launching in France on 11 February 2016. For its first four years on-air, the channel's programming was geared toward young children and teenagers. It also used the logo introduced by the original block in 2004, as well as branded promos that were first used for the Southeast Asian feed.

During evenings, the channel was branded as Toonami Unlimited, airing programs and several All Elite Wrestling events (which are not produced by Warner Bros. Discovery, but air on their channels in the United States) with little to no censorship. On 24 July 2019, an Adult Swim block began airing nightly from 11 p.m. to 2 a.m. CET, followed by adding live-action series and AEW Dynamite to Toonami Unlimited's programming.

In September 2020, Toonami underwent a rebrand and shifted its target audience to teenagers and young adults, with its programs no longer subject to censorship during the daytime. On 14 September, the channel was added to StarTimes, being available alongside its English-language African counterpart.

On 10 January 2023, Toonami was dropped from Canal+, following a failure of negotiations for the renewal of Warner channels.

On 28 June 2023, it was announced that Toonami France would be replaced by Warner TV Next on 4 September, becoming part of the Warner TV franchise that exists in other European, Asian, and Latin American countries.

Following the launch of HBO Max in June 2024, the channel was made available through the service for all HBO Max subscribers.

== Visual identity ==
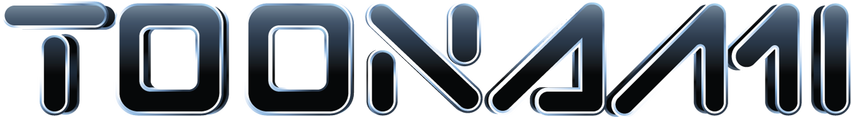
Logo used from 2016 to 2020

Logo used from 2020 to 2023

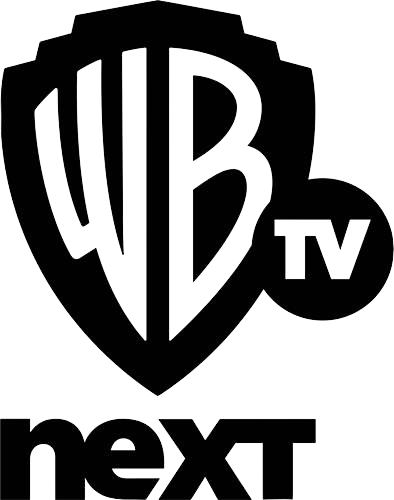
Current logo used from 2023

== Programming ==
- All Elite Wrestling
  - AEW Collision
  - AEW Dynamite
- Batman
- The Batman
- Batman Beyond
- Batman: The Animated Series
- Batman: The Brave and the Bold
- Black Clover
- Dragon Ball
- Dragon Ball Super
- The Green Hornet
- Harley Quinn
- Iron Man: Armored Adventures
- Justice League
- Justice League Action
- Justice League Unlimited
- My Hero Academia
- The New Batman Adventures
- Smallville
- X-Men: Evolution
- Wolverine and the X-Men
- Young Justice
- Children of Captain Africa

=== Adult Swim ===
- 12 oz. Mouse
- Aqua Teen Hunger Force
- Archer
- Ballmastrz: 9009
- Birdgirl
- Black Dynamite
- Black Jesus
- Blade Runner: Black Lotus
- The Cleveland Show
- Close Enough
- Dickie
- The Eric Andre Show
- Fena: Pirate Princess
- Final Space
- Harvey Birdman, Attorney at Law
- Hot Streets
- Housing Complex C
- The Jellies!
- Joe Pera Talks with You
- King Star King
- L'Épopée temporelle
- Loiter Squad
- Metalocalypse
- Mike Tyson Mysteries
- Momma Named Me Sheriff
- Moral Orel
- Mostly 4 Millennials
- Mr. Pickles
- NTSF:SD:SUV::
- Primal
- Rick and Morty
- Robot Chicken
- Royal Crackers
- Samurai Jack
- The Shivering Truth
- Smiling Friends
- Soft Focus with Jena Friedman
- Space Ghost Coast to Coast (upcoming)
- Teenage Euthanasia
- Tender Touches
- Three Busy Debras
- Tigtone
- Tropical Cop Tales
- Unicorn: Warriors Eternal
- The Venture Bros.
- YOLO
- Your Pretty Face Is Going to Hell
