= Eurosport News =

International television network

- Country: Europe, Asia-Pacific
- Headquarters: Paris, France

Programming
- Languages: English, French, Portuguese, Russian
- Picture format: 576i (16:9 SDTV)

Ownership
- Owner: Discovery Inc.
- Sister channels: Eurosport 1 Eurosport 2

History
- Launched: 1 September 2000; 26 years ago
- Closed: 4 January 2018; 8 years ago
- Replaced by: Eurosport 2 (some countries)

Links
- Website: eurosport.com

Eurosport News was the first 24-hour international Europe-based sports news channel part of the European sports network Eurosport, owned by Discovery Inc. It was available in 11 million homes in 54 countries.

== History ==
The channel launched on 1 September 2000 and closed down on 1 January 2018. It featured live scores, highlights, most recent breaking news and commentaries with recorded voiceovers, similar to Euronews. Eurosport News' sportscasts were broadcast around the clock in 15-minute blocks with frequent updates. The service combined video, text and graphics with the screen being divided into 4 sections. A video section that displayed highlights and news bulletins, a breaking news ticker at the bottom and a scoring section that gave in-depth analysis of results and game stats.

The channel was made available on the Beijing Olympic Village as part of a deal inked in June 2008, two months before the start of the 2008 Summer Olympics].

A Portuguese office opened on 1 October 2010. The channel closed on 1 January 2018, as part of a strategic plan.
