= Discovery Turbo =

Pay television channel

- Country: United Kingdom
- Broadcast area: Australia; India

Ownership
- Owner: Skydance Corporation
- Sister channels: List: Animal Planet; Discovery; Discovery Historia; Discovery History; Discovery Science; DMAX Germany, Austria, Switzerland & Liechtenstein; DMAX Spain; DMAX United Kingdom & Ireland; Food Network; Investigation Discovery; Quest; Quest Red; Real Time Italy; Really; TLC Netherlands; TLC Poland; TLC Romania; TLC UK and Ireland; Travel Channel

History
- Launched: 15 March 2005; 21 years ago
- Replaced: Discovery Wings (UK & Ireland); Discovery Kids (UK & Ireland)
- Replaced by: DMAX (Southeast Asia)
- Former names: Discovery Turbo MAX (2009–2015, Australia only)

Links
- Website: https://www.discovery.com/ (Dead link, repleaced by the Warner Bros. Discovery Website

Discovery Turbo (previously known as Discovery Turbo MAX in Australia) is a pay television channel devoted to programming about transport. It is similar to Discovery Velocity and Discovery Turbo. It was also briefly available as an on-demand service in the US in the late 2000s.

== Feeds ==
=== Discovery Turbo Latin America ===
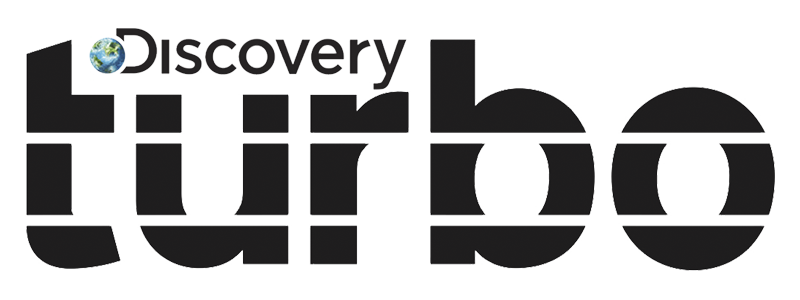
Logo used from 2010 to 2015

The channel launched in Latin America in 2005.

=== Discovery Turbo UK ===
It launched on 1 March 2007, replacing Discovery Wings and Discovery Kids.

=== Discovery Turbo Asia ===
Discovery Turbo launched in Southeast Asia on September 22, 2008, replacing Discovery Real Time. Discovery Turbo Asia ended its broadcast on July 7, 2014 as it has been rebranded to DMAX on the same day.

=== Discovery Turbo India ===
The channel launched on January 28, 2010. From March 1, 2021 the channel started to follow a timeshifted version of DMAX Asia's schedule.

=== Discovery Turbo Australia ===
In Australia, the channel first launched in 2008 on SelecTV, replacing Discovery Real Time which previously launched on 15 March 2007. The channel ceased being available in late 2010 following SelecTV's closure of its English service. A separate feed, named Discovery Turbo MAX, launch on 15 November 2009 on the Foxtel platform. At launch, the channel was also available on a two-hour delay, with the time shift channel called Discovery Turbo MAX +2. In May 2015, the channel rebranded as Discovery Turbo, seeing it change to a similar branding to that used by other Discovery Turbo channels around the world.

=== Discovery Turbo New Zealand ===
In New Zealand, the channel is known as Discovery Turbo, with similar branding and content to other Discovery Turbo channels around the world. It launched on 1 November 2015 on channel 75 exclusively to Sky Television.

=== DTX in Europe ===
In Europe, the channel is known as DTX (formerly known Discovery Turbo Xtra), with similar branding and content to other Discovery Turbo channels around the world. Launched in Poland on 17 September 2013, as a replacement for Discovery World, the channel initiated its EMEA rollout between 2015 and 2016. On 21 November 2016 Discovery Turbo Xtra was rebranded as DTX.

Warner Bros. Discovery EMEA has announced that DTX, along with Discovery Science, will cease broadcasting in EMEA except Poland on 31 December 2023.

=== Discovery Turbo Japan ===
The channel launched on 30 January 2018 as one of channel in dTV service. The channel was rebranded as Motor Trend in 2020.

=== Discovery Turbo Italy ===
On January 4, 2026, the Italian version of Motor Trend was rebranded as Discovery Turbo.

=== Discovery Turbo U.S. ===
Discovery Turbo was briefly available as an on-demand service in the US in the late 2000s.

On January 9, 2026, the American version of Motor Trend was rebranded as Discovery Turbo, marking the return of the brand to the United States.
