= Serena Yang =

American television journalist

Serena Yang is an American television journalist, producer and documentary film director, best known for her series Eye of the Beholder on the Discovery HD Channel and the Travel Channel, and her role as the West Coast Correspondent of CNN’s World Beat.

A former international correspondent for CNN, Yang was a writer, producer and reporter for E! Entertainment Television’s E! Features.

Some of her notable interviews are Robert De Niro, Martin Scorsese, Robert Redford, Sean Penn, Glenn Close, Al Pacino, Susan Sarandon, Sydney Pollack, Demi Moore, Michael Douglas, Annette Bening, John Cleese, Julia Roberts and Oprah Winfrey.

Yang established Serena Yang Productions in 1998, producing programming for CNN, MGM, Miramax, The Walt Disney Company and Paramount Pictures on subjects ranging from Mongolian throat-singing to the inner-workings of the CIA.

Most recently, Yang traveled the world for Discovery Networks as the creator, executive producer and host of the series, Eye of the Beholder.

In 2008, FremantleMedia Enterprises (FME) announced the signing a deal with Yang to deliver a host of lifestyle titles.
