= Discovery Channel Europe =

Discovery Channel (Europe)
- Country: United Kingdom
- Broadcast area: Iceland; Ukraine; Israel; Czech Republic; Slovakia; Lithuania; Bosnia and Herzegovina; Montenegro; Albania; Macedonia; Cyprus; Greece; Malta; Sub-Saharan Africa, broadcasting MENA channel
- Headquarters: Amsterdam, Netherlands

Programming
- Picture format: 1080i HDTV (downscaled to 576i for the SD feed)

Ownership
- Owner: Skydance Corporation

History
- Launched: 1 April 1989; 37 years ago

Availability

Terrestrial
- DStv: Channel 121 (Discovery Channel Africa)
- Zuku TV: Channel 414 (Discovery Channel Africa)
- ZAP: Channel 127 (Discovery Channel Africa)
- StarTimes: Channel 224 (Discovery Channel Africa)

Discovery Channel (Europe) is the Pan-European version of the Discovery Channel.

Over the years, the Discovery Channel has been split into many different channels for specific regions. Most language regions in Western Europe now have their own versions of the channel, and the Pan-European is therefore now mostly available in countries in Central and Eastern Europe.

The channel is broadcast from the United Kingdom and holds an Ofcom licence. The channel was registered as "Discovery Channel Europe" until August 2006, when it changed its name to "Discovery (Central & Eastern Europe inc. Russia)". Later it changed back to Discovery Channel (Europe).

Discovery Channel (Europe) was launched from the UK in 1989. It launched on the Astra satellite in 1993. Eventually it split into different channels for different markets:

- Discovery Channel Africa
- Discovery Channel Bulgaria
- Discovery Channel Croatia
- Discovery Channel Denmark
- Discovery Channel Estonia
- Discovery Channel Finland
- Discovery Channel Flanders
- Discovery Channel France
- Discovery Channel Germany
- Discovery Channel Hungary
- Discovery Channel Italy
- Discovery Channel Latvia
- Discovery Channel Netherlands
- Discovery Channel Norway
- Discovery Channel Poland
- Discovery Channel Portugal
- Discovery Channel Romania
- Discovery Channel Russia
- Discovery Channel Serbia
- Discovery Channel Slovenia
- Discovery Channel Spain
- Discovery Channel Sweden
- Discovery Channel Turkey
- Discovery Channel UK and Ireland

Some of the countries that still receive the European version are Iceland, Ukraine, Israel, Czech Republic, Slovakia, Lithuania, Bosnia and Herzegovina, Montenegro, Albania, Macedonia, Cyprus, Greece, Malta and Sub-Saharan Africa.

== Logo ==
One logo (from 1 April 1989 to 18 September 1995)
