= Discovery Channel Romania =

Discovery Channel
- Country: Romania
- Broadcast area: Romania

Programming
- Language: Romanian
- Picture format: 1080i HDTV (downscaled to 16:9 576i for the SDTV feed)

Ownership
- Owner: Warner Bros. Discovery EMEA
- Sister channels: Animal Planet; Antena 3 CNN; CNN International; Cartoon Network; Cartoonito; Eurosport; Eurosport 2 Food Network; HGTV; Investigation Discovery; TLC; Warner TV

History
- Launched: 1 July 2006; 20 years ago (first launch); 18 June 2024; 2 years ago (second launch)
- Closed: January 12, 2018 (first launch)

Links
- Website: discovery.ro

Discovery Channel (often referred to as simply Discovery) is a Romanian pay television channel owned by Warner Bros. Discovery. Its programming is primarily sourced from Discovery Channel in the US.

Discovery was officially launched in 1997 and, along with Eurosport, became one of the first foreign channels to be broadcast in the Romanian language, featuring Romanian subtitles on the Brisith European feed.

In June 2006, with the establishment of the local subsidiary Discovery Romania in Bucharest, a separate feed specifically for Romania was launched on 1 July 2006.

The channel adopted the new Discovery logo on 1 July 2009 along with its sister channels in Central Europe.

On 3 June 2014, Discovery Channel Romania launched a new look, emphasizing its iconic D-globe logo.

However, after several years of absence from the lineup of Digi, the largest cable operator, and over a year after its reintroduction, Discovery decided to close the local feed on 12 January 2018. It was replaced by the central European feed that included local advertising.

On 18 June 2024, the Romanian local feed was relaunched.

== Programming ==
- Deadliest Catch
- Dr. G: Medical Examiner
- How It's Made
- Man vs. Wild
- One Way Out
- American Chopper
- MythBusters
