= Discovery Channel (Netherlands) =

- Country: Netherlands
- Broadcast area: Netherlands
- Network: Discovery Benelux

Programming
- Language: Dutch
- Picture format: 1080i HDTV (downscaled to 16:9 576i for the SDTV feed)

Ownership
- Owner: Warner Bros. Discovery EMEA
- Sister channels: Animal Planet; Discovery Science; Eurosport 1; Eurosport 2; Investigation Discovery; TLC

History
- Launched: 1 April 1989; 37 years ago (European feed); 6 January 1997; 29 years ago (Localized Dutch feed)
- Replaced: Discovery Channel Europe (1989-2003)

Links
- Website: discoveryplus.nl/zenders/discovery

Availability

Terrestrial
- Digitenne: Channel 16 (HD)

Streaming media
- Ziggo GO: ZiggoGO.tv (Europe only)

Discovery Channel is a Dutch free-to-cable television channel airing in the Netherlands. Its primary target is men aged 25–39. It launched on 6 January 1997.

Cable television is widely available in the Netherlands, and Discovery is available on virtually every platform. It has enjoyed relatively high ratings for several years; in 2018 it had 1.5 percent share of all viewing.

== History ==
Discovery Channel launched in Europe on 1 April 1989. By December 1992, most of the programs on Discovery Channel Europe already had Dutch subtitles.

The localized Dutch version of the namesake American television channel launched on 6 January 1997, replacing the European feed.

The Dutch Discovery Channel distinguishes itself from other versions by having broadcast live sports events. In late November 2008 it broadcast three matches from the Eredivisie that resulted in high ratings. These matches were seen by 805,000 viewers.

In August 2009 the channel switched to the 16:9 widescreen format.

In May 2012 Discovery Networks Benelux launched a HD simulcast of Discovery Channel in the Netherlands, replacing Discovery HD Showcase and was first introduced by UPC Netherlands.

Animal Planet, Eurosport 1, Investigation Discovery and TLC are also widely available. Eurosport 2 and Discovery Science are available as well, but they are only distributed as part of bonus packages.
