= World Heritage Channel =

Television channel in Asia

- World Heritage Channel logo
- Country: Hong Kong
- Broadcast area: Southeast Asia
- Headquarters: Hong Kong

Programming
- Languages: English; Indonesian; Thai; Malay; Chinese
- Picture format: 1080i HDTV (downscaled to 576i/480i for the SD feed)

Ownership
- Owner: Warner Bros. Discovery Asia-Pacific (Warner Bros. Discovery International)

History
- Launched: April 20, 2015

World Heritage Channel is a documentary channel available in Asia. World Heritage Channel is operated by Warner Bros. Discovery International. It first launched in Philippines through ACCION on April 20, 2015.

World Heritage Channel's programming categories include culture, travel, history, and natural heritage. The channel's content is intended cover places such as UNESCO's World Heritage Sites.

World Heritage Channel's programming consists of acquired, first-run content for the region from documentary makers. Noteworthy shows include The World Heritage Site, Journey to Natural World Heritage Sites and Beautiful Planet. Asian documentaries include Asia's Monarchies and Asia Rising. Travel documentaries on the channel include Travel Bug and Paradise Asia. Turner has also picked up several series narrated by David Attenborough - David Attenborough's Conquest of the Skies 3D and Flying Monsters 3D.

The channel is available in HD with Chinese, Malaysian, Indonesian and Thai subtitles. The channel has selected video-on-demand content and catch-up rights.

== Key shows ==
- Asia's Monarchies
- David Attenborough's Conquest of the Skies
- David Attenborough's Flying Monsters
- Giants of the Deep
- Journey to Natural World Heritage Sites
- Sacred Sites: Ireland
- Must See! Must Eat! Must Do! Taiwan
- The Travel Bug
- The World Heritage Site
