= DTX (TV channel) =

Pay television channel

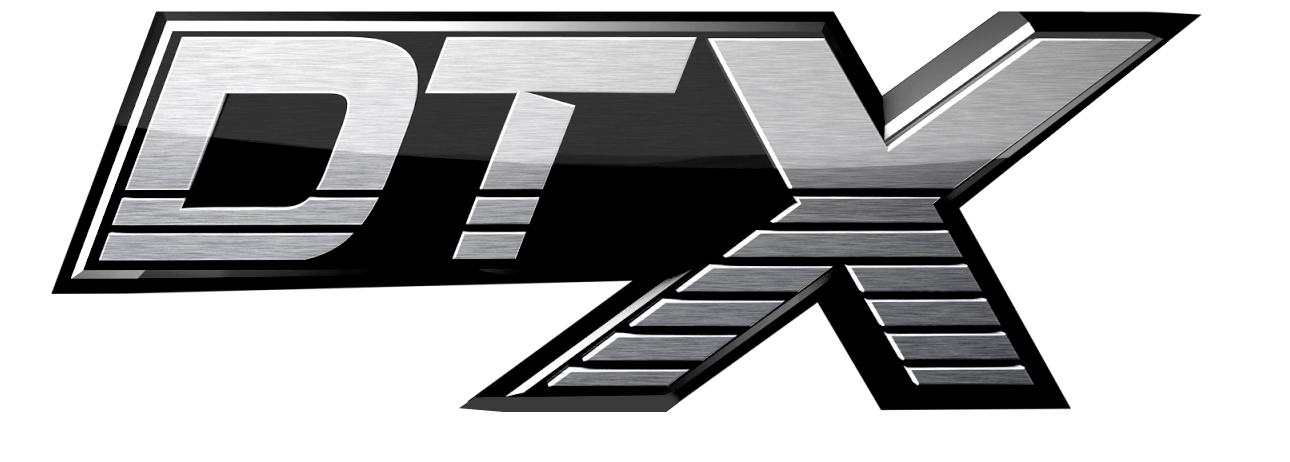
- Broadcast area: Current: Poland; Former: Albania, Hungary, Romania, Czech Republic, Slovakia, Russia and CIS, Ukraine, Turkey, MENA
- Headquarters: Amsterdam, Netherlands

Programming
- Picture format: 1080i HDTV

Ownership
- Owner: Warner Bros. Discovery EMEA
- Sister channels: List: Animal Planet; Discovery Channel; Discovery Science; Food Network; Investigation Discovery; TLC; Travel Channel

History
- Launched: 17 September 2013; 13 years ago (Poland); 1 April 2016; 10 years ago (Middle East)
- Replaced: Discovery World
- Closed: 5 January 2024; 2 years ago (EMEA Excluding Poland)
- Former names: Discovery Turbo Xtra (2013–2016)

DTX (previously known as Discovery Turbo Xtra) is a Polish television channel focused on programming about cars available in Poland and owned by Warner Bros. Discovery EMEA. It is a version of Discovery Turbo. A pan-regional feed was also available in most of EMEA region from 2015 until it ceased broadcasting in January 2024.

DTX and Discovery Science ceased operations in all EMEA markets except Poland on 31 December 2023, with Almost complete network shutdowns by January 2024.

== History ==
In Europe Discovery Civilisation, also called Discovery Civilisation Channel, started in the UK on 1 October 1998, alongside the Sky Digital's launch, and this was later followed by other European countries. Discovery Civilisation focused on history-related programmes. On 1 November 2007, it was re-branded as Discovery Knowledge in the UK.

=== Discovery World ===
Discovery World
- Broadcast area: Africa; Belgium; Central and Eastern Europe; Italy; Middle East; Netherlands; Nordic countries; Latin America; Portugal
- Headquarters: Amsterdam, Netherlands

Programming
- Languages: English, Polish, Hungarian, Czech, Russian
- Picture format: 576i 16:9 SDTV

Ownership
- Owner: Warner Bros. Discovery (Discovery, Inc. at the time)
- Sister channels: Animal Planet; Discovery; Discovery Science; Eurosport 1; Eurosport 2; Investigation Discovery; TLC

History
- Launched: 1 October 1998; 27 years ago
- Closed: 31 December 2020; 5 years ago
- Replaced by: DTX (Eastern Europe); Discovery Family (Middle East & Africa)
- Former names: Discovery Civilisation Channel (1998-2008)

Availability (at time of closure)

Streaming media
- Ziggo GO Netherlands: ZiggoGO.tv (Europe only)

On 18 April 2008 Discovery Civilisation changed its name into Discovery World across Europe and extended its programme lineup to also include programmes about culture, crime and "mysterious phenomena". Discovery World offered a mix of history, culture, real-life stories, investigation, mystery shows, factual series and documentaries. At time of closure its programming was mainly in English and subtitled in Dutch.

In 2013, the channel got replaced by Discovery Turbo Xtra in Central and Eastern Europe. In 2015 the Canadian version was relaunched as Discovery Velocity. On 31 March 2016, the channel was replaced by Discovery Family in Africa and the Middle East. The network has closed down in Italy, Portugal and Scandinavia.

Discovery World, along with Fine Living, closed on 31 December 2020, when it last aired in the Netherlands and Belgium.

=== Discovery Turbo Xtra ===
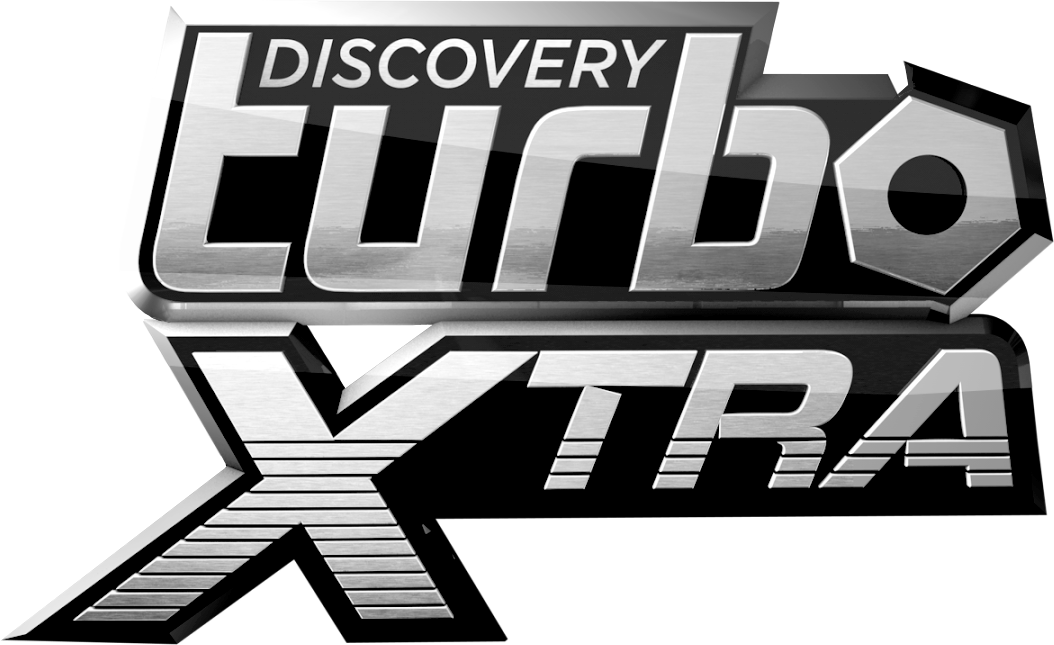
Discovery Turbo Xtra Logo (2013-2016)

The channel was launched as Discovery Turbo Xtra to replace the European version of Discovery World, with the first launch in Poland on 17 September 2013. The channel roll-out in 2015 in Albania and in 2016 in Hungary, Romania, Czech Republic, Slovakia, Baltics, Russia, CIS, Ukraine, Turkey and MENA. In the Middle East, it was launched on 1 April 2016 on beIN Network. A few months later the network was rebranded worldwide as DTX.

On 9 March 2022, Discovery Inc. pulled their channels from the Russian market after the nation's invasion of Ukraine.
