= TLC (Swedish TV channel) =

TLC Sweden
- Broadcast area: Sweden
- Headquarters: London, United Kingdom

Ownership
- Owner: Warner Bros. Discovery EMEA (Skydance Corporation)
- Sister channels: Discovery Channel

History
- Launched: 2 December 2010; 15 years ago
- Replaced: Discovery Travel & Living Europe

Links
- Website: tlcsverige.se

Availability

Terrestrial
- Boxer: Channel 21

TLC is a Swedish television channel. Its primary target is women between 25 and 49. It launched on 2 December 2010, replacing Discovery Travel & Living Europe in Sweden.

It is the second dedicated Swedish channel from Discovery Networks after Discovery Channel Sweden. Prior to the launch of the dedicated TLC channel for Sweden, its predecessors had been available in Sweden for over a decade.

Following Discovery's acquisition of SBS Nordic in 2013, TLC Sweden became a part of SBS Discovery Media with five dedicated TV channels for Sweden. From 15 January 2014 the channel dramatically increased its reach by joining the analogue line-up of Com Hem, the country's leading cable network.
