= Animal Planet (European TV channel) =

European pay television channel

- Country: United Kingdom
- Broadcast area: Armenia, Azerbaijan, Albania, Belarus, Bosnia & Herzegovina, Bulgaria, Croatia, Cyprus, Czech Republic, Estonia, France, Georgia, Greece, Hungary, Kazakhstan, Kyrgyzstan, Latvia, Lithuania, Moldova, Montenegro, North Macedonia, Romania, Serbia, Slovakia, Slovenia, Spain, Turkey, Ukraine, Middle East, Africa
- Network: Skydance Corporation
- Headquarters: Amsterdam, Netherlands

Programming
- Languages: English; Czech; Hungarian; Russian; Turkish; Arabic; Romanian (subtitles); Bulgarian (subtitles); Serbian (subtitles); Croatian (subtitles); Slovene (subtitles); Albanian (subtitles); Estonian (subtitles); Latvian (subtitles)
- Picture format: 1080i HDTV (downscaled to 16:9 576i for the SDTV feed)
- Timeshift service: Animal Planet +1 (UK)

Ownership
- Owner: Skydance International Content and Distribution
- Sister channels: Discovery Channel; Discovery HD; Discovery Home & Health; Discovery Historia; Discovery History; Discovery MAX; Discovery Science; Discovery Shed; Discovery Travel & Living Europe; Discovery Turbo; Discovery World; Investigation Discovery; DMAX Germany, Austria, Switzerland & Liechtenstein; DMAX United Kingdom & Ireland; Quest; Real Time Italy; TLC Netherlands; TLC Poland; TLC UK and Ireland

History
- Launched: 1997; 29 years ago
- Closed: March 9, 2022; 4 years ago (Russia)

Availability

Terrestrial
- evotv (Croatia): Channel 112
- Zuku TV (Kenya): Channel 416

The Pan-European Animal Planet is a feed of the U.S. channel of the same name, which broadcasts to several countries in Europe, UK, Africa and the Middle East.

The channel is broadcast in English, Czech, Hungarian and Russian. The HD feed also carries a Turkish audio track. Turkey has its own SD feed. The channel also carries DVB subtitle tracks in Arabic, Albanian, Bulgarian, Croatian, Danish, Dutch, Estonian, Finnish, French, Greek, Latvian, Macedonian, Norwegian, Romanian, Serbian, Slovenian and Swedish.

There used to be a separate feed for Romania, but the channel closed down in 2013.

Many regions in Europe that previously received the pan-European version of the channel, now receive a localised version.

- Animal Planet (Dutch TV channel) for The Netherlands and Flanders.
- Animal Planet (German TV channel) for Germany, Austria, Liechtenstein and the German-speaking part of Switzerland.
- Animal Planet (Polish TV channel)
- Animal Planet Russia (Defunct due to the war that broke out between Russia and Ukraine)
- Animal Planet Turkey
- Animal Planet (British TV channel) for the UK & Ireland

Ukraine, CIS and the Baltic countries still get the pan-European feed in Russian and English.

== History ==
The channel launched in Europe in 1997 and on 1 September 1998 it began broadcasting in the UK via the Astra Satellite and on analogue cable. It was on air each day from midday until midnight.

In October 2008, Animal Planet adopted the new branding and current logo.

In March 2009, the on-air logo changed its colour from green to white and became transparent.

On September 4, 2012, Animal Planet improved its picture quality by increasing the resolution from 544x576 to 720x576.

Since October 2012, all of the programming - including promos - is broadcast in Anamorphic widescreen picture format.

On 31 December 2017, Animal Planet ceased broadcasting in Africa on DStv.

Currently, Animal Planet is ad-free on its main feed. Some countries, like Romania and Moldova, get localised ad blocks. Animal Planet Italy for Italy and the Italian-speaking part of Switzerland ceased broadcasting on 31 January 2019 after a new distribution agreement between Discovery and Sky Italia.

On 9 March 2022, Discovery Inc. closed Animal Planet in Russia due to Russia's invasion of Ukraine.

== Programming ==
- After Dark
- Animal Battlegrounds
- Baby Planet
- Bad Dog
- Cats 101
- Dark Days in Monkey City
- Dogs 101
- Galapagos
- Growing Up...
- I'm Alive
- Killer Wales
- Max's Big Tracks
- Must Love Cats
- Penguin Safari
- Rescue Vet
- Safari Vet School
- Search for the Knysna elephants
- Shamwari: A Wild Life
- Talk to the Animals
- The Magic of The Big Blue
- Trophy Cats
- Wild Africa Rescue
- Wild Animal Orphans
- Wild France
- Wildest Islands
- Wildest Islands of Indonesia
- Wildlife SOS
- World Wild Wet
