= Junk Gypsies =

The Junk Gypsy Company, commonly known as Junk Gypsies because of their HGTV show are a fashion/art/design trio composed of sisters Amie Sikes and Jolie Sikes and their mother, Janie.

Their company, Junk Gypsy Co., based in Round Top, Texas, was created by Amie and Janie in 1998 to sell vintage flea market finds. The Sikes team achieved considerable spotlight when Miranda Lambert hired them to redesign her Airstream tour bus in 2010, and then again for the design of Lambert's wedding to Blake Shelton in 2011.

Their HGTV show, Junk Gypsies, aired in 2012. Among the highlights of the season was their redesign of Dierks Bentley's Airstream tour bus, including a custom resin table made out of concert posters and a lighting fixture made from a motorcycle gas tank.

They have since been featured in another HGTV show called "Garage Sale Wars".

Jolie gave a tour of the Junk Gypsy Inn to one of the Barnwood Builders when they built a barn at Round Top Texas in the season 10 episode 3 of Barnwood Builders - Biggest Barn Ever

== Criticism ==
Many in the Roma and traveller community have attempted to get HGTV to change the name of the show. Gypsy refers to an ethnic group which they do not belong. The Romani communities liken the use of gypsy in the name alongside junk as another insult in a long line of insults against the Roma people.
