= Up Close and Dangerous =

Up Close and Dangerous is a half-hour series, produced by NHNZ Ltd. and aired on Animal Planet, profiling each episode three wildlife photographers and their dangerous encounters in filming wild animals. The show aired its first episode on 12 February 2007.

Shuhaidah Saharani of the Malay Mail said the series "takes viewers on an emotional roller-coaster with some of the world's most acclaimed filmmakers. Each of their encounters with their pet subject, which can instantly changes from breathtaking to alarming." An example episode ("Elephant Seals, Polar Bears and Pilot Whales") described the following encounters:

Florian Graner filming sea lions, was surprised by an elephant seal;

Max Quinn filming a polar bear and her cub in the Arctic;

Lee Tepley attacked while filming a group of pilot whales.

Barbara Hooks of The Age wrote, "some of the best stories happen behind the camera, as this two-hour special reveals in dramatic, in-your-face detail". According to The Daily Telegraph, "the camerawork is, at times, astounding, with the best being a camera being all-but-swallowed by a great white shark"

Daily Mirror television critic Jane Simon praised the television series, writing, "With exotic locations and amazing footage, this action-packed four-part series is essential viewing for all armchair Attenboroughs." Emily Ashby of Common Sense Media stated, "Frightening tales and sometimes-aggressive wildlife scenes rule out this show for viewers too little to understand basic animal behavior, but its educational value makes it a good family viewing choice for young tweens and up."
