= Discovery Channel (Hungary) =

Discovery Channel Hungary
- Country: Hungary
- Broadcast area: Hungary
- Affiliates: Discovery Romania

Programming
- Language: Hungarian
- Picture format: 4:3 (2005-2011); 16:9 (2011-present)

Ownership
- Owner: Warner Bros. Discovery EMEA

History
- Launched: 1 March 2005; 21 years ago
- Replaced: Discovery Channel Europe

Links
- Website: discoverychannel.hu

Discovery Channel Hungary is a Hungarian television channel.

The independent Hungarian feed of Discovery Channel launched on 1 March 2005. Advertising sales were handled by R-Time, which was owned by RTL.

Along with the other Discovery channels in Central Europe, Discovery Hungary adopted the new Discovery logo on 1 July 2009.

The Attraktor, the first Hungarian-made programme on the channel, was first shown on 14 November 2014 in the Czech Republic, Hungary and Romania. The show had been formerly aired on the news website Index.hu which now produces the series.
