= Cartoonito (France) =

French children's television channel

- Country: France
- Broadcast area: France; Belgium; Switzerland; Luxembourg; Monaco; Morocco; Sub-Saharan Africa; Madagascar; Mauritius; Overseas France; Haiti

Programming
- Languages: French; Original audio track
- Picture format: 1080p (HDTV); 576i SDTV

Ownership
- Owner: Skydance Corporation
- Parent: Skydance Corporation
- Sister channels: Cartoon Network; Warner TV Next; TCM Cinéma; Warner TV; TLC; Discovery Channel France; Discovery Investigation; Boomerang

History
- Launched: 3 September 2011; 15 years ago (as a block); 3 April 2023; 3 years ago (as a channel)
- Replaced: Boing
- Closed: July 5, 2013; 13 years ago (as a block)

Availability

Terrestrial
- StarTimes: Channel 364

Cartoonito is a French children's television channel aimed at preschoolers between the ages of 3 and 6. It was originally launch as the French version of Boing on April 8, 2010.

== History of Cartoonito France ==
Original logo used from September 3, 2011 to July 5, 2013

Boing once carried a Cartoonito-branded block between 3 September 2011 to 5 July 2013. In May 2021, it was announced that there were plans to relaunch Cartoonito within the region around Spring 2022, with HBO Max. On 2 February 2023, it was announced that Boing would be replaced by a new branding of Cartoonito on 3 April 2023.

The network programming initially was made of reruns and mostly targeting a family audience, as Boing with reruns of Cartoon Network, Boomerang and Toonami, and films. Most of Cartoon Network's international acquisitions aired on Boing, while Cartoon Network France focuses on Cartoon Network Originals. Boing France co-produced some French shows (Zorro, the Chronicles, Chronokids, and Miss Moon) and made a mini-series: JuMo.

In June 2024, HBO Max was launched in France, and the channel was made available through the default service for all HBO Max subscribers.

== See also ==
- List of international Cartoon Network channels
- List of programs broadcast by Boomerang
- List of programs broadcast by Cartoonito
