= Discovery Channel (Sweden) =

- Country: United Kingdom
- Broadcast area: Sweden

Ownership
- Owner: Warner Bros. Discovery EMEA (Skydance Corporation)

History
- Launched: 2006; 20 years ago

Links
- Website: discoveryplus.se/kanaler/discovery

Availability

Terrestrial
- Boxer: Channel 21

Discovery Channel (often referred to as simply Discovery) is the Swedish language version of the Discovery Channel, using a "factual entertainment" concept similar to the original American channel. As of 2006, it was the eighth most watched channel in Sweden (MMS).

The channel used to broadcast the same schedule as the other Discovery channels in the Nordic countries, but with Swedish language presentation, advertising and subtitles. In spring 2007, the Swedish channel differentiated itself from the Nordic sister channels and started using Swedish voice-overs in the programmes and a schedule specially adapted for the Swedish market.

In autumn 2001, Discovery received a license to broadcast in the Swedish digital terrestrial television network. The channel has traditionally been a part of most analogue basic cable packages.

On March 31, 2009, Discovery Channel Sweden adopted the new logo which had been launched on the US Discovery Channel in 2008.

Other channels from Discovery Communications available in Sweden are Animal Planet Nordic, Discovery Travel & Living, Discovery World and Discovery Science. Discovery HD was launched in Sweden on November 1, 2006.
