= Discovery Channel (Denmark) =

- Country: Denmark
- Broadcast area: Denmark; Faroe Islands; Greenland

Programming
- Picture format: 1080i HDTV

Ownership
- Owner: Skydance Corporation

History
- Launched: 2002; 24 years ago

Links
- Website: discoveryplus.dk/kanaler/discovery

Discovery Channel (often referred to as simply Discovery) is a Danish television channel.

The Discovery Channel has been available to Danish viewers since 1989, but started becoming increasingly localised during the 2000s. For example, they have increasingly started broadcasting programmes in Danish.

Since TNS Gallup started measuring viewing for the channel in 2002, the channel has continuously held a 1.3 percent share of all viewing.

The channel is available from most cable networks, including YouSee. On satellite it is available from Canal Digital. On 1 February 2009 it started broadcasting terrestrially via Boxer's transmitters.

Discovery Channel Denmark started using the new version of the Discovery Channel logo on 31 March 2009.

Other channels from Discovery available in Denmark are Animal Planet, Discovery Travel & Living, Discovery Science, Discovery World, Discovery HD and Animal Planet HD.
