= On Telecoms =

Greek telecommunications company

On Telecoms S.A.
- Company type: S.A.
- Industry: telecommunications
- Founded: 2006
- Headquarters: Chalandri, Athens, Attica, Greece
- Key people: Andreas Rialas, Chairman; Gregoris Anastasiadis, Managing Director
- Products: Telecom (telephony, internet) and IPTV services
- Website: on.gr
- Footnotes / references Motto: Πραγματικά μεγάλη (Truly great); Εσείς ζητάτε, η ON πραγματοποιεί (you ask for it, ON makes it real)

On Telecoms was a Greek telecommunications company offering triple play, double play and fixed telephony services in Athens and Thessaloniki through Local Loop Unbundling.

The company was founded in March 2006 and started its commercial operations in January 2007. In November 2009 the company expanded in Thessaloniki. In October 2009 it acquired Vivodi Telecom and achieved the operational integration of the two companies within a few months.
On Telecoms offered a range of telephony, internet and digital TV (IPTV) services for residential customers, small businesses and enterprises.

On 30 June 2015 On Telecoms ceased all services and its IP addresses returned to the RIPE NCC's free pool.

== You Are One ==
In July 2010, On Telecoms launched You Are One, a new service that allowed its website visitors to build a tailored program and buy it on-line.

== Support ==
The company's main support channel was 13801, which was available 365 days a year and could provide support regarding technical issues, billing information and other customer service issues.

== Infrastructure ==
On Telecoms had deployed a backbone network, based entirely on IP/MPLS (Internet Protocol), using up to 10 Gbit/s bandwidth interconnection.

== Broadband development ==
As part of its investment plan, the company had completed the “On Telecoms broadband development” project. The project included:

- Head - End Live TV development.
- Video On Demand development.
- Provision and installation of decoders (Set Top Boxes).
- Development of a multimedia digital library (movies, theater).

The project was included in the action "Funding of private-sector companies for the development of broadband access in the Regional Areas of Greece” of Information Society S.A. that has been included in the Operational Program Information Society (O.P.I.S.) of the 3rd Community Support Framework. The project's budget was 4.9 million euro, of which 50% was public expenditure. The expenditure was 80% funded by the European Regional Development Fund and 20% by the Greek Government. The action aimed to increase the availability of new innovative broadband services.

== See also ==
- Internet in Greece
