= Naxoo =

Cable television provider in Geneva, Switzerland

Naxoo logo

Naxoo is a Swiss cable television company owned by 022 Télégenève. The company also provides broadband internet and telephone services in Switzerland.

Launched in Geneva in 1986, Naxoo offers a mixture of Swiss and foreign TV channels, both analog and digital, as well as radio channels (arte, 3sat, Euronews, TV5Monde, ARD, ORF eins, France 2, Rai 1 as required by law).
