= TotalTV (Serbian TV provider) =

Serbian satellite television company

- Type: Subsidiary
- Industry: Media
- Founded: 2006.
- Headquarters: Belgrade, Serbia
- Area served: Bosnia Herzegovina, Croatia, Montenegro, North Macedonia, Serbia, Slovenia
- Services: Satellite television
- Parent: United Group
- Website: www.totaltv.tv www.telemach.hr/total-tv (Croatia) (SLOVENIA)

Old logo

Total TV is a satellite television provider co-owned by Serbian United Group. It broadcasts via Eutelsat 16A satellite (16.0E) and has over 1 million subscribers in Southeast Europe, namely Bosnia Herzegovina, Croatia, Montenegro, North Macedonia, Serbia and Slovenia.

The Croatian stake was sold to new owners of V-Investment Holdings B.V; despite the change in ownership the name of the service has remained the same. They are direct competitors to MAXtv of Hrvatski Telekom and A1. The Serbian operations were sold on April 2, 2025, to Telekom Srbija, who later changed the name to M:sat TV.
