= Discovery Channel Finland =

- Broadcast area: Finland

Ownership
- Owner: Skydance Corporation
- Sister channels: Discovery HD Showcase; Animal Planet; Animal Planet HD

History
- Launched: 1 September 2007; 19 years ago

Links
- Website: http://www.discoverychannel.fi/

Availability

Terrestrial
- DNA: Channel 44

Discovery Channel Finland is a television channel targeting Finland formerly owned by Discovery Networks and now owned by Skydance Corporation. It has programming similar to its U.S. counterpart, the Discovery Channel.

It was launched on 1 September 2007, replacing a former pan-Nordic version of the Discovery Channel. On the same day, the analogue terrestrial transmitters were shut down and a new digital network containing, among other, Discovery Channel Finland was launched. In the terrestrial network it is a part of both the Canal Digital and PlusTV packages.

The pan-Nordic version of the Discovery Channel had carried subtitles in Swedish, Finnish, Norwegian and Danish. The new channel only contains Finnish subtitles.
