= Discovery Channel (Russia) =

Russian TV channel

- Broadcast area: Russia (2006–2022); Belarus (2006–2026); CIS; Moldova; Georgia

Programming
- Languages: Russian, English
- Picture format: 1080i HDTV (downscaled to 576i for the SD feed)

Ownership
- Owner: Skydance International Networks

History
- Launched: September 20, 2006; 20 years ago
- Closed: March 9, 2022; 4 years ago (Russia); July 1, 2026; 4 months ago (Belarus)

Links
- Website: discoverychannel.ru

Discovery Channel (often referred to as simply Discovery) is a television channel which formerly broadcast in Russia and Belarus and still broadcasts in CIS, Georgia and Moldova.

According to viewing research, Discovery had the second largest reach of all non-terrestrial television channels in the beginning of 2009; only the news channel RBC TV was more popular.

== History ==
In late 2007, Discovery switched to the ABS 1 satellite, meaning it would extend its reach eastwards and be accessible in all of Russia, as well as several countries in Central Asia. Advertising sales started soon thereafter, on December 1, 2007. Discovery's ad sales in Russia were handled by a company called Video International.

Until 2006, Discovery was represented in Russia and the CIS countries by Zone Vision. This partnership ended when Discovery changed their representative to Media Broadcasting Group Limited. MBG became responsible for the distribution of all seven Discovery channels in Russia, while Discovery contemplated opening an office of their own in Moscow.

Discovery halted all broadcasts of its 15 linear channels to Russia through the Media Alliance partnership on March 9, 2022, in response to the Russian invasion of Ukraine, although it still broadcasts in CIS, Belarus, Georgia, and Moldova as of today. As a result, the country of Russia was the only place in the world where Warner Bros. Discovery (at that time, it was WarnerMedia and Discovery, Inc.) was not in operation.

At the beginning of July 2026, the channel was closed in Belarus along with Eurosport 1 and Eurosport 2 channels and theme package Discovery on the platform ZALA IPTV.
