= Kabelnoord =

Dutch cable operator

- Company type: Public company
- Industry: Telecommunications
- Founded: 1979
- Headquarters: Dokkum, Friesland, Netherlands
- Area served: Friesland and Groningen
- Products: Cable television Digital television Internet; Telephony
- Website: www.kabelnoord.nl

NV Kabeltelevisie Noord-Oost Friesland is a Frisian cable and fiber to the home (FTTH) operator, providing digital cable television, Internet, and telephone service to both residential and commercial customers, in the Dutch provinces of Friesland and Groningen.

== History ==
Kabelnoord was established in 1979 as a common utility company with the aim of connecting as many households as possible to cable television. In 1996 the company became a public limited company, with municipalities as shareholders. Although it remained part of the regional gas company, acquired by Eneco in 2000, it was gradually separated, with the process completed in 2009. In 2016, Kabel Noord initiated the development of a fiber-optic network in rural areas across the province of Friesland.

== See also ==
- Digital television in the Netherlands
- Internet in the Netherlands
- List of cable companies in the Netherlands
- Television in the Netherlands
