= Delta (company) =

Dutch telecoms company

DELTA
- Company type: Subsidiary of DELTA Fiber Netherlands
- Industry: Telecommunications
- Founded: 1991
- Headquarters: Middelburg, Netherlands
- Key people: Marco Visser (CEO)
- Products: Cable television IPTV; Digital television Internet; Telephony
- Owner: EQT
- Parent: DELTA Fiber Netherlands
- Website: www.delta.nl

DELTA is a cable operator in the Netherlands, providing digital cable television, Internet, and telephone service to both residential and commercial customers in mainly the province of Zeeland. In addition, Delta supplies fiber-to-the-home in large parts of the Netherlands.

DELTA began as a merger between Watermaatschappij Zuidwest-Nederland and Provinciale Zeeuwsche Electriciteits-Maatschappij in 1991, providing electricity, gas, heat, and cable television. On 1 March 2017, the cable division was taken over by the Swedish investment fund EQT. EQT also acquired cable company Caiway by the end of 2017. Both companies are within one holding DELTA Fiber Netherlands as of 1 August 2018.

== See also ==
- Digital television in the Netherlands
- Internet in the Netherlands
- List of cable companies in the Netherlands
- Television in the Netherlands
