= Caiway =

Dutch cable operator

- Company type: Subsidiary of DELTA Fiber Netherlands
- Industry: Telecommunications
- Founded: 1981 (as CAI Westland)
- Headquarters: Schiedam, Netherlands
- Key people: Albert Vergeer (CEO)
- Products: Cable television IPTV; Digital television Internet; Telephony
- Owner: EQT
- Parent: DELTA Fiber Netherlands
- Website: www.caiway.nl

Caiway (or simplified as CAIW) is a cable operator in the Netherlands, providing digital cable television, Internet, and telephone service to both residential and commercial customers in mainly the Westland, Twente and Schiedam areas. In addition, Caiway provides its services via the DELTA fiber optic network in large parts of the Netherlands.

Caiway began as CAI Westland (Central Antenna Installation Westland) in 1981 and it was the first cable operator to offer internet in the Netherlands, starting in 1995. At the end of 2017, the company was taken over by the Swedish investment fund EQT. EQT was already the owner of cable operator DELTA operating in the province of the Zeeland. Both companies are within one holding DELTA Fiber Netherlands as of 1 August 2018.

Caiway acts on the networks of CAIW (and some joint venture networks of CAIW) as a wholesale provider and provides access to the networks to these service providers. This creates the option on CAIW's networks to choose an alternative service provider, such as Fiber Nederland, Solcon, WeServe, Kliksafe or Cbizz. The Wholesale Ethernet Access (EAS) service was launched in 2014.

== See also ==
- Digital television in the Netherlands
- Internet in the Netherlands
- List of cable companies in the Netherlands
- Television in the Netherlands
