= Discovery Channel France =

Discovery Channel
- Country: United Kingdom
- Broadcast area: France; Switzerland; Belgium; Luxembourg; Monaco; French Speaking Africa; Lebanon; Overseas France; Haiti

Programming
- Language: French
- Picture format: 16:9 1080i (HDTV)

Ownership
- Owner: Warner Bros. Discovery EMEA
- Sister channels: Cartoon Network; Cartoonito; TCM Cinéma; Warner TV; TLC; Warner TV Next; Discovery Investigation; Boomerang

History
- Launched: 1 August 2004; 22 years ago

Links
- Website: discoverychannel.fr

Discovery Channel is a French channel that was launched on 1 September 2004. Until then, France had been the only region in Western Europe not reached by the Discovery Channel. It initially reached 3.2 million subscribers via the CanalSat platform. On 31 March 2009, the channel adopted the original American version of the channel.

The channel faces competition from other documentary channels such as Planète+ and National Geographic.

In December 2016, Altice acquired an exclusivity agreement with NBCUniversal and Discovery Networks. Discovery Channel and Science were removed from Canal on 17 January 2017, and French versions of Investigation Discovery and Discovery Family were launched exclusively on SFR. In June 2024, HBO Max was launched in France, and the channel was made available through the service for all HBO Max subscribers.

== Programming ==
Programs are mostly taken from the United Kingdom and the United States, and include:

- American Chopper
- Biker Build-Off (Duels de bikers)
- Building the Future (Construire l'avenir)
- Eyewitness (Temoin sur le vif)
- How Do They Do It? (Comment ça marche ?)
- Long Way Round (L'echappee belle)
- Megastructures (Mega constructions)
- MythBusters (Myth busters)
- Really Big Things (Monstres Mecaniques)
- Smash Lab (Crash Lab)
- Time Warp
- Top Gear
