= Discovery Science (European TV channel) =

European pay television channel

- Discovery Science logo.
- Country: United Kingdom
- Broadcast area: Europe; Middle East; Africa
- Headquarters: Amsterdam, Netherlands

Programming
- Languages: English; Dubbed: Czech; French; Hungarian; Italian; Polish; Turkish; Subtitled: Arabic; Bulgarian; Romanian; Swedish
- Picture format: 1080i HDTV (downscaled to 16:9 576i for the SDTV feed)
- Timeshift service: Discovery Science +1

Ownership
- Owner: Warner Bros. Discovery
- Parent: Warner Bros. Discovery EMEA
- Sister channels: List: Animal Planet; Discovery; Discovery Historia; Discovery History; Discovery Turbo; DMAX Germany, Austria, Switzerland & Liechtenstein; DMAX Spain; DMAX United Kingdom & Ireland; Food Network; Investigation Discovery; Quest; Quest Red; Real Time Italy; Really; TLC Netherlands; TLC Poland; TLC Romania; TLC UK and Ireland; Travel Channel

History
- Launched: 1 October 1998; 28 years ago
- Closed: 9 March 2022; 4 years ago (Russia); 5 January 2024; 2 years ago (Central / Eastern Europe, CIS, MENA, Africa, and Turkey Excluding Poland); 26 February 2024; 2 years ago (France)
- Replaced by: TLC (France)
- Former names: Discovery Sci-Trek (1997–2003); Discovery Science Channel (2003–2008)

Discovery Science is a pay television network, operated by Warner Bros. Discovery EMEA. It broadcasts to several European countries. It primarily features programming in the fields of space, technology and science. The channel originally launched as Discovery Sci-Trek. Its programming is mainly in English and locally subtitled or dubbed. It is available through numerous subscription services across Europe. In some countries the advertisement and the announcements between programs are localized.

Discovery Science, alongside DTX, ceased broadcasting in Central and Eastern Europe and the Middle East on 5 January 2024. The channel started to be removed from the TV operators from 1 January 2024. However, the channel continues to broadcast in the United Kingdom, Ireland, Poland, the Nordic region and the Netherlands.

== History ==
On 19 August 1998, Discovery announced they would launch several new digital channels to coincide with the launch of Sky Digital platform, one of which would be Discovery Sci-Trek, a UK version of the Discovery Science Channel in the United States. However, despite early plans to launch it under the US name, the channel went on air as Discovery Sci-Trek on 1 October 1998.

The channel later saw launches in other European countries, and eventually the channel rebranded as the Discovery Science Channel on 1 April 2003.

In April 2008, the channel's name was shortened to simply Discovery Science, which was followed by the launch of a one-hour timeshift service on 21 April 2008 in the United Kingdom, located on Sky 549, which replaced a placeholder 90-minute timeshift of Discovery Channel, known as Discovery +1.5.

On 24 January 2013, Discovery channels returned on Numericable in France. In December 2016, Altice acquired an exclusivity agreement with NBCUniversal and Discovery Networks. Discovery Channel, Discovery Science and Investigation Discovery were removed from Canal+ on 17 January 2017. The channel (along with Discovery Channel) had high shares (0,5% in 2014, 0,4% in 2016) before have been removed from Canal+.

On 9 March 2022, Discovery Inc. closed Discovery Science in Russia due to Russia's invasion of Ukraine.

In February 2024, it was announced that the channel would be replaced by TLC in France from 26 February 2024.

== Programming ==
- Beyond Tomorrow
- Building the Ultimate
- Burn Notice
- Extreme Engineering
- Food Factory
- How It's Made
- How Do They Do It?
- How Machines Work
- Invention Nation
- Nextworld
- Pasik
- Race to Mars
- Raging Planet
- Rough Science
- Ten Ways
- The Big Experiment
- Through the Wormhole
- Understanding
- Universe (narrated by John Hurt)
- The Gadget Show

== Logos ==
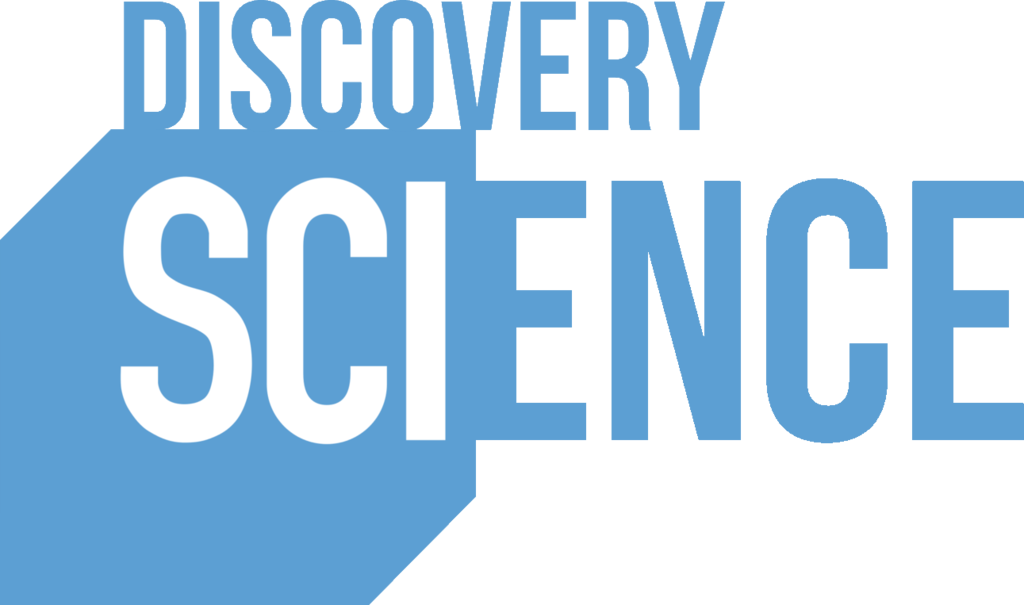
Current logo since 2017.

Throughout its life as the Discovery Sci-Trek Channel, the channel used an image of the rings of Saturn as its logo and in idents. When relaunching as the Discovery Science Channel, it became a stylised molecule, with the Discovery Channel globe as one of its atoms.

Since then, the channel had followed its United States counterpart The Science Channel, currently known as 'Science', in logo trends. In March 2008, Discovery Science adopted a modified version of the periodic table logo used from 2007, and in 2012, the channel adopted the new 'Morph' logo introduced in 2011.

== Availability ==
=== Cable ===
- CAI Harderwijk (Netherlands): Channel 135
- Caiway (Netherlands): Channel 111
- Citycable (Switzerland): Channel 81
- DELTA (Netherlands): Channel 352
- Kabel Noord (Netherlands): Channel 255
- SFR (France): Channel 41
- Stichting Kabelnet Veendam (Netherlands): Channel 76
- UPC (Poland): Channel 377
- UPC (Romania): Channel 308
- UPC (Switzerland): Channel 179 (Romandy), Channel 479 (German Swiss) and Channel 679 (Ticino)
- Virgin Media (Ireland): Channel 211
- Virgin Media (UK): Channel 179 and Channel 379 (+1)
- WightFibre (UK): Channel 77
- Ziggo (Netherlands): Channel 202

=== IPTV ===
- BT TV (UK): Channel 336
- eir Vision (Ireland): Channel 525
- KPN (Netherlands): Channel 84
- Tele2 (Netherlands): Channel 207
- T-Mobile (Netherlands): Channel 64
- Vodafone (Greece): Channel 307
- Freebox (France):Channel 64 (Now TLC France)

=== Online ===
- Virgin TV Anywhere (Ireland): VirginMediaTV.ie
- Virgin TV Anywhere (UK): VirginMedia.com
- Ziggo GO (Netherlands): ZiggoGO.tv
- discovery+ discoveryplus.com

=== Satellite ===
- Cyfrowy Polsat (Poland): Channel 127
- OSN (MENA): Channel 504
- Platforma Canal+ (Poland): Channel 77
- Sky (Italy): Channel 405
- Sky (UK): Channel 167 and Channel 267 (+1)
- Sky (Ireland): Channel 167 and Channel 267 (+1)
- StarSat (South Africa): Channel 663
- Zuku TV (Kenya): Channel 415

== See also ==
- Science Channel
