= TLC (Dutch TV channel) =

- Country: Netherlands
- Broadcast area: Netherlands; Belgium
- Network: Discovery Benelux

Programming
- Language(s): Dutch; English
- Picture format: 1080i HDTV (downscaled to 16:9 576i for the SDTV feed)

Ownership
- Owner: Warner Bros. Discovery
- Sister channels: Animal Planet; Discovery Channel; Discovery Science; Eurosport 1; Eurosport 2; Investigation Discovery

History
- Launched: 4 July 2011; 13 years ago

Links
- Website: www.dplay.nl/zenders/tlc www.tlc.be

Availability

Terrestrial
- Digitenne: Channel 17 (HD)

Streaming media
- Ziggo GO: ZiggoGO.tv (Europe only)
- Yelo TV: Watch live (Belgium only)

TLC is a Dutch free-to-cable television channel which broadcasts lifestyle programmes. It airs programmes related to lifestyle, health, food, and reality shows. Its main target is the female audience. Warner Bros. Discovery EMEA launched the channel on 4 July 2011.

TLC initially aired from 6pm till 2am on the standard-definition channel of Animal Planet making this a time-sharing channel in the Netherlands.

On 1 October 2012 TLC extended its air time from 3pm till 2am. TLC became a 24-hours channel on 8 January 2013. An HD-simulcast started through UPC Netherlands on 15 May 2013.

== Programming ==
- 24 Hours in A&E
- A Gypsy Life for Me
- Ace of Cakes
- Addicted
- All-American Muslim
- Anthony Bourdain: No Reservations
- Beauty and the Geek Australia
- Becoming Chaz
- Boy Cheerleaders
- Brides of Beverly Hills
- Cake Boss
- Candy Queen
- Carson Nation
- Cherry Healey Investigates...
- Choccywoccydoodah
- Confessions Of An Animal Hoarder
- DC Cupcakes
- Deadly Sins
- Deadly Women
- Devious Maids
- Disappeared
- Dr. G Medical Examiner
- Dresscue Me
- Driving Me Crazy
- Extreme Couponing
- Extreme Poodles
- Facing Trauma
- Fatal Encounters
- Great British Food
- Great British Hairdresser
- Happily Ever Laughter
- Hookers Saved on the Strip
- How Sex Works
- I Didn't Know I Was Pregnant
- I Married a Mobster
- I'm Pregnant And...
- Jodie Marsh Tattoo Apprentice
- Jodie Marsh: Bodybuilder
- Kate Plus 8
- Kell on Earth
- Kill It, Cut It, Use It
- Kitchen Boss 2
- Kitchen Boss: Behind the Scenes
- LA Ink
- Last Chance Salon
- Liefde In Uitvoering
- Lily Allen: From Riches to Rags
- Lip Service
- Lottery Changed My Life
- Ludo Bites America
- Mad About the House
- Mad Fashion
- Made in Chelsea
- Miami Ink 2
- Mob Wives
- My Big Fat American Gypsy Wedding
- My Greek Kitchen
- My Naked Secret
- Next Great Baker 2
- NY Ink
- Offspring
- On the Case with Paula Zahn
- One Born Every Minute
- Oprah: Behind the Scenes
- Outrageous Kid Parties
- Police Women of Broward County
- Rich Bride, Poor Bride
- Sarah Palin's Alaska
- Say Yes to the Dress
- Say Yes to the Dress: Bridesmaids
- Secretly Pregnant
- Sister Wives
- Skins
- Small Teen Bigger World
- Snog, Marry, Avoid
- Strange Sex
- Take Home Nanny
- The Rachel Zoe Project
- TLC Doc: Josie: My Cancer Curse
- TLC Doc: The Man with Half a Body
- Toddlers & Tiaras
- Too Fat for 15: Fighting Back
- True CSI
- Truth Be Told
- Twincredibles
- Underage and Having Sex
- Virgin Diaries
- What Not to Wear
- Who Do You Think You Are?
- Why Is Sex Fun?
- Will & Grace (season 9)
- Will & Grace (season 10)
- World's Worst Mom
- Your Style in His Hands

== See also ==
- TLC (TV network)
