= Discovery Historia =

- Country: Poland
- Broadcast area: Poland
- Headquarters: Media Business Centre; Warsaw, Poland

Programming
- Language(s): Polish
- Picture format: 576i (16:9 SDTV)

Ownership
- Owner: Warner Bros. Discovery
- Parent: TVN Warner Bros. Discovery
- Sister channels: Animal Planet; Discovery Channel; Discovery Life; Discovery Science; Investigation Discovery; TLC

History
- Launched: 15 November 2006; 18 years ago
- Former names: Discovery TVN Historia (2006-2009)

Links
- Website: discoveryhistoria.pl

Discovery Historia is a Polish television channel broadcasting history-related programmes. The channel was originally a joint-venture between Discovery Networks and TVN, but TVN left the venture in 2009. (Discovery later acquired Scripps, the owners of TVN.) It is headed by Barbara Bilińska-Kępa.

From its launch, the channel featured some Polish productions, such as Wielkie Ucieczki, Rozmowy niekontrolowane Macieja Szumowskiego, Historie z Karty and Archiwum X. Śledztwa po latach.

On 30 May 2009 TVN withdrew from the channel and sold its stake to Discovery Networks. Hence, the channel became fully owned by Discovery Networks Central Europe.

Because TVN was no longer associated with the channel and Discovery Networks has updated its corporate profile, the channel received a new logo on 1 October 2009. The new logo was created in-house by Discovery.

Discovery Historia used to be exclusively available on the satellite platform N, but that changed after TVN sold their share. The cable operator Jambox announced they would offer the channel in October 2009. Later in the same month it was launched on Multimedia Polska.

== Logos ==
First Discovery Historia (TVN) logo used 2006-2009

Second Discovery Historia logo used 2009-2016
