= Investigation Discovery (Europe, Middle East and Africa) =

EMEA channel variant of Inestigation Discovery

- Country: United Kingdom
- Broadcast area: Europe; Middle East; Africa
- Headquarters: Amsterdam, Netherlands

Programming
- Languages: English; Dubbed: Arabic; Bulgarian; Czech; Hungarian; Latvian; Polish; Russian; Turkish; Subtitled: Albanian; Arabic; Croatian; Danish; Dutch; Estonian; Finnish; Greek; Macedonian; Norwegian; Portuguese; Romanian; Serbian; Slovene; Swedish
- Picture format: 1080i HDTV (downscaled to 16:9 576i for the SDTV feed)
- Timeshift service: Investigation Discovery +1

Ownership
- Owner: Warner Bros. Discovery EMEA
- Sister channels: List: Animal Planet; Discovery; Discovery Historia; Discovery History; Discovery MAX; Discovery Science; Discovery Turbo; DMAX Germany, Austria, Switzerland & Liechtenstein; DMAX UK & Ireland; Food Network; Quest; Quest Red; Real Time Italy; Really; TLC Netherlands; TLC Poland; TLC Romania; TLC (UK & Ireland); Travel Channel

History
- Launched: 20 January 2009; 17 years ago
- Replaced: Discovery Travel & Living (Netherlands and Flanders); nTalk (Poland); TVN Lingua (Poland)

Availability

Terrestrial
- See separate section

Streaming media
- See separate section

Investigation Discovery (abbreviated as ID) is the pay television channel variant of Investigation Discovery, owned by Skydance, broadcasting to Europe, the Middle East and Africa. It competes in the same genre as Crime & Investigation Network. The ID channel features crime programming, including "missing persons and murder inquiries, cold cases and historical crime," as well as documentaries on forensic investigations. One such program is Deadly Women, an investigative series in which former FBI agent and profiler Candice DeLong looks at female killers throughout history.

Its programming is mainly in English and locally subtitled or dubbed. In some countries, the advertisements and the announcements between programs are localized.

== History ==
The original namesake American channel became available on cable television in the United States in January 2008. In Europe, the channel was first made available in the United Kingdom and Ireland.

=== Central and Eastern Europe ===
The channel launched in Poland, Romania, Hungary and Greece in April 2009, followed by Serbia, Slovenia, Croatia, Bosnia, and Montenegro in May 2009. On 28 June 2009 the channel replaced nTalk on the Polish platform N. On 15 July it replaced TVN Lingua on Cyfra+. In September 2009, it was announced that the channel would be added to RCS/RDS's offerings. The Baltic states followed in August 2009, when it launched on the Latvian Lattelecom platform.

=== Africa ===
Since 2011, Investigation Discovery Africa launched on DStv channel 171. Investigation Discovery began broadcasting in HD 3 years later. Besides DStv, Investigation Discovery Africa is available on GOtv, Azam TV, StarTimes and previously on now-defunct Kwese TV.

=== France ===
Since 15 December 2015, the channel is available exclusively to SFR TV subscribers, as a part of a deal between SFR and Discovery. In June 2024, HBO Max was launched in France, and the channel was made available through the service for all HBO Max subscribers.

=== Netherlands and Flanders ===
Investigation Discovery replaced Discovery Travel & Living in the Netherlands and Flanders on 4 July 2011. An HD-simulcast started through Ziggo in the Netherlands on 8 February 2017.

=== Portugal ===
Investigation Discovery launched in Portugal on 2 October 2018 exclusively on NOS. In February 2022, the channel was made available to MEO subscribers. The Portuguese feed has only local subtitles.

=== Sweden ===
Investigation Discovery had been broadcasting to Sweden since 2010, but was initially not widely available through major distributors. On 1 October 2014, it was added to the leading cable network Com Hem. It was added by satellite operator Canal Digital on 15 December. In January 2015, Discovery bought the terrestrial broadcasting license held by multicultural channel Kanal Global. That channel stopped broadcasting on 15 February 2015 and Investigation Discovery took over the license after that. The transaction was accepted by the Swedish Broadcasting Authority and the license is valid until 2020.

On 1 June 2015 a localized version launched in Sweden with content adapted for the Swedish market. The first original Swedish programme to air on the channel was Brottscentralen, a live crime show produced by Aftonbladet. Brottscentralen premiered on Investigation Discovery on 31 August 2015. During its first seven months on air, the channel achieved a 0.5 percent share of viewing and reached 1.8 percent of the population each week.

== Availability ==
=== Cable ===
- CAI Harderwijk (Netherlands): Channel 136
- Caiway (Netherlands): Channel 26
- DELTA (Netherlands): Channel 30
- Kabel Noord (Netherlands): Channel 253
- NOS (Portugal): Channel 74
- SFR (France): Channel 43
- Stichting Kabelnet Veendam (Netherlands): Channel 77
- Telenet (Belgium): Channel 351 (Flanders) and Channel 341 (Brussels and Wallonia)
- Virgin Media (Ireland): Channel 504
- Virgin Media (UK): Channel 166 and Channel 366 (+1)
- YouSee (Denmark): Channel 149
- Ziggo (Netherlands): Channel 123 (HD) and Channel 984 (SD)

=== IPTV ===
- EE TV: Channel 324
- eir Vision (Ireland): Channel 131
- KPN (Netherlands): Channel 21
- Proximus TV (Belgium): Channel 76 (Flanders) and Channel 326 (Brussels and Wallonia)
- Tele2 (Netherlands): Channel 23
- T-Mobile (Netherlands): Channel 65
- Free: Channel 65

=== Online ===
- Virgin TV Anywhere (Ireland): VirginMediaTV.ie
- Virgin TV Anywhere (UK): VirginMedia.com
- Ziggo GO (Netherlands): ZiggoGO.tv

=== Satellite ===
- DStv (Sub-Saharan Africa): Channel 171 (HD)
- Joyne (Netherlands): Channel 17
- OSN (MENA): Channel 505 (HD)
- Platforma Canal+ (Poland): Channel 147
- Sky (UK & Ireland): Channel 154 and Channel 254 (+1)
- Zuku TV (Kenya): Channel 417
- AzamTV (Africa): Channel 200
- StarTimes (Africa): Channel 223

=== Terrestrial ===
- Digitenne (Netherlands): Channel 29
- Mediaset Premium (Italy): Channel 320
- GOtv (Sub-Saharan Africa): Channel 52

== See also ==
- Investigation Discovery
- Crime & Investigation Network
- Discovery Channel
