= Discovery HD =

High-definition television channel network owned by Warner Bros. Discovery

- Broadcast area: Worldwide

Ownership
- Owner: Warner Bros. Discovery

History
- Launched: February 2005; 21 years ago
- Replaced by: Discovery HD World

Discovery HD is the high-definition television channel extension of the Discovery Channel owned by the EMEA division of Warner Bros. Discovery.

The international Discovery HD (later Discovery HD World in Asia-Pacific markets, now Discovery Asia) first launched in Korea in February 2005 as a programming block. In December 2005, Discovery HD Japan and Discovery HD Canada (since renamed Discovery World HD, now Discovery Velocity) launched as 24-hour channels, becoming the 100th and 101st Discovery networks overall. After that, Discovery HD expanded into other markets as follows:

- February 2006 in Germany and Austria on the Sky Germany satellite platform. (Closed November 29, 2012 and was replaced by an HD-simulcast of Discovery Channel Germany.)
- May 2006 in the United Kingdom and Ireland on Sky Digital with the launch of the Sky+ HD service.
- October 2006 in Poland on the n platform and the Netherlands.
- November 1, 2006 in the Nordic countries when Canal Digital launched their HD package in Sweden, with Denmark, Finland and Norway following in 2007.
- January 18, 2007 in Singapore on the StarHub TV platform.
- January 31, 2008 in Hong Kong on now TV.
- 2008 in Russia on NTV Plus.
- March 1, 2009 in South Korea on Skylife
- April 1, 2009 in the Czech Republic on Sky Link as Discovery HD Showcase
- June 2008 in Australia on Foxtel HD+ and Turkey on HD-Smart]
- May 2009 in the Philippines on SkyCable
- 20 July 2009 in Italy, Discovery Channel HD on Sky Italia
- December 2009 in Southern Africa on DStv
- On 26 January 2010, Discovery Real Time France was replaced by Discovery HD Showcase, on Canalsat and Belgacom TV
- February 2010 in the Middle East & North Africa on OSN
- February 2010 in India as Discovery HD World India.
- March 5, 2010 in India on Sun Direct DTH
- April 1, 2010 in the United Kingdom on Virgin Media.
- June 2, 2010 in Portugal on Zon as Discovery HD Showcase.
- September 1, 2010 in Romania on UPC Romania DVB-C as Discovery HD Showcase
- September 6, 2010 in Portugal on Cabovisão DVB-C as Discovery HD Showcase
- May 15, 2012 Discovery Benelux began to replace Discovery HD Showcase by an HD simulcast of Discovery Channel in the Netherlands.
- On 18 September 2012, Discovery HD Showcase France ceased transmissions, replaced by Discovery Channel HD and Discovery Science HD, always exclusively on Canalsat ; in Belgium (Belgacom TV), Discovery Science wasn't made available
- December 4, 2012 in Brazil as Discovery Channel HD, like the USA channel he simulcasts the main Discovery Channel SD feed, but airs high-definition versions of programming when available.
- December 14, 2012 in Bosnia and Herzegovina on Logosoft as Discovery HD Showcase
- June 2, 2014 in Flanders (Belgium) as Discovery Channel HD, replacing Discovery HD Showcase. Although not officially announced, it will probably be a HD simulcast of the SD feed.
- March 1, in Kazakhstan on Otau TV as Discovery Showcase HD Kazakhstan in HD and SD versions with Kazakh, Russian an English audio tracks.
- In July 2019 in Portugal, Discovery Showcase HD was replaced by Discovery Channel HD, on Nowo.
- On 16 October 2019, Discovery Channel HD was added into Astro from Malaysia through Channel 572.
- April 8, 2022: Discovery, Inc. and WarnerMedia merged to form a single company, Warner Bros. Discovery, under Discovery Inc.'s CEO David Zaslav

The first American HD Discovery channel has the name Velocity and launched in June 2002.

A second Discovery HD channel, called 'Discovery Channel HD', was launched in the USA on Dish Network the week of August 13, 2007. This new channel simulcasts the main Discovery Channel feed, but airs high-definition versions of programming when available. It is also available on DirecTV and various U.S. cable operators along with fellow sister high definition version networks TLC, Animal Planet, and Science Channel.

In the United Kingdom and Ireland, Discovery HD began to simulcast the main Discovery Channel feed in high-definition on June 30, 2011, rather than use a separate schedule.

On 1 December 2014, Discovery HD Showcase changed its name to Discovery Showcase HD (with the words HD and Showcase inverted).

The 2005-2009 logo

The 2010–2012 Discovery HD Showcase logo
