= TLC (Polish TV channel) =

Programming
- Language: Polish
- Picture format: 1080i HDTV

Ownership
- Owner: Warner Bros. Discovery
- Parent: Warner Bros. Discovery EMEA

History
- Launched: 15 October 2009; 17 years ago (as Discovery Travel & Living); 1 October 2010; 16 years ago (as TLC)
- Replaced: Discovery Travel & Living Europe (1999-2009)
- Former names: Discovery Travel & Living Polska (2009-2010)

TLC is a Polish television channel which broadcasts lifestyle-centred television series. It targets mature women and broadcasts programmes related to lifestyle, health, food, and more.

The namesake American version of the channel, was launched on 15 September 2009 by Discovery Networks Central Europe as the local version of Discovery Travel & Living. It replaced the Pan-European version of the channel, which had been available in Poland since 1999. Unlike the Pan-European version, the Polish channel offers advertising. The channel has 3.6 million subscribers. On 1 October 2010, Discovery Travel & Living Poland became TLC, as part of Discovery's rebranding plan of most of its Discovery Travel & Living channels worldwide.

On 18 August 2013, a block of programmes from the Oprah Winfrey Network (OWN) was launched on TLC Poland, making Poland the first country in central and eastern Europe to receive OWN programming.

== See also ==
- TLC (TV network)
