= Cartoon Network (Germany) =

Former German pay TV channel

- Country: Germany
- Broadcast area: Germany; Austria; Switzerland; Liechtenstein; Italy (South Tyrol); Luxembourg
- Headquarters: Munich, Germany

Programming
- Languages: German; English
- Picture format: 1080i HDTV (downscaled to 16:9 576i for the SDTV feed)

Ownership
- Owner: Warner Bros. Discovery EMEA
- Sister channels: Warner TV Comedy; Warner TV Serie; Warner TV Film; Cartoonito; CNN International

History
- Launched: 17 September 1993 (as Cartoon Network Europe); 3 September 2005; 21 years ago (as a block on Kabel eins); 5 December 2006; 19 years ago (as an independent channel)
- Replaced: Cartoon Network Europe
- Closed: December 2013; 12 years ago (as a block on Kabel eins); 25 September 2024; 23 months ago (as a channel)
- Replaced by: Cartoon Network (Western Europe)

Links
- Website: www.cartoonnetwork.de (dead link, redirects to its YouTube channel)

Cartoon Network was a German pay television channel which primarily broadcast cartoons. It was based in Munich and was available in Germany, Austria, Switzerland, Liechtenstein, South Tyrol in Italy, and Luxembourg.

== Broadcasting ==
In August 2013, SES Platform Services (later MX1, now part of SES Video) won an international tender by Turner Broadcasting System to provide playout services for Cartoon Network, Boomerang, glitz*, TNT Film and TNT Serie (in both SD and HD) for the German-speaking market, digitization of existing Turner content, and playout for Turner on-demand and catch-up services in Germany, Austria, Switzerland and the Benelux region, from November 2013.

M7 Group's Kabelkiosk stopped broadcasting of Cartoon Network on 1 March 2017.

== History ==
Unlike the other Big Four countries in Western Europe, and even Spain, Germany did not receive a localized version of Cartoon Network during the 1990s. Instead, programming from Hanna-Barbera, Warner Bros. Animation and Cartoon Network Studios was licensed to the various free to air broadcasters in Germany, with later reruns happening on the German kids channel Junior during the 2000s, for shows such as Animaniacs and Cow and Chicken.

Kabel eins would launch a Cartoon Network themed Saturday morning programming block on 3 September 2005. In December 2013 Kabel eins cancelled the programming block, but its programming continues to be available on German terrestrial television through channels like Super RTL and even Disney Channel Germany.

In June 2006, a German version of Boomerang was launched; this was followed by the simultaneous launch of Cartoon Network Germany as a 24-hour channel and TCM Germany on 5 December 2006.

The German version of Ben 10: Ultimate Challenge was recorded at studios in London in August 2011 and premiered on 8 October that year.

On 1 September 2016, Cartoon Network Germany re-branded using graphics from the Check It 4.0 branding package.

Logo used from 5 December 2006 to 25 November 2010.

On 25 September 2024, Cartoon Network Germany merged with the French, Dutch, Portuguese and Scandinavian feeds.
