= 22.2 surround sound =

Surround sound component of Super Hi-Vision

22.2 or Hamasaki 22.2 (named after Kimio Hamasaki, a senior research engineer at NHK Science & Technology Research Laboratories in Japan) is the surround sound component of Super Hi-Vision (a new television standard with 16 times the pixel resolution (7680×4320) of HDTV (1920x1080)). It has been developed by NHK Science & Technical Research Laboratories. It uses 24 speakers (including two subwoofers) arranged in three layers.

== Channels ==
Diagram of three major multichannel audio formats: 5.1, 9.2 and 22.2 channel layouts.

The channel numbers and labels are:

AES Pair No./Ch No.	Channel No.	Label	Name
1/1	1	FL	Front left
1/2	2	FR	Front right
2/1	3	FC	Front center
2/2	4	LFE1	LFE-1
3/1	5	BL	Back left
3/2	6	BR	Back right
4/1	7	FLc	Front left center
4/2	8	FRc	Front right center
5/1	9	BC	Back center
5/2	10	LFE2	LFE-2
6/1	11	SiL	Side left
6/2	12	SiR	Side right
7/1	13	TpFL	Top front left
7/2	14	TpFR	Top front right
8/1	15	TpFC	Top front center
8/2	16	TpC	Top center
9/1	17	TpBL	Top back left
9/2	18	TpBR	Top back right
10/1	19	TpSiL	Top side left
10/2	20	TpSiR	Top side right
11/1	21	TpBC	Top back center
11/2	22	BtFC	Bottom front center
12/1	23	BtFL	Bottom front left
12/2	24	BtFR	Bottom front right

Channel numbers up to 6 represent the same as those in a 5.1 channel system. There are then a further 5 listener-plane channels, 9 overhead channels, arranged in a square, and a row of 3 further channels at the bottom front, plus the additional LFE channel.

== Demonstrations ==
- Expo 2005, Aichi, Japan
- NAB Show 2006, Las Vegas, US
- IBC 2006, Amsterdam, Netherlands
- IBC 2008, Amsterdam, Netherlands
- NAB Show 2009, Las Vegas, US
- IBC 2010, Amsterdam, Netherlands
- IBC 2011, Amsterdam, Netherlands
- 2012 Summer Olympics, Bradford/Glasgow/London, UK

== Reviews ==
- Ultra HD draws crowds, interest at NAB2006 at Broadcast Engineering Magazine, May 2, 2006

== See also ==
- Ultra-high-definition television
- Surround sound
- NHK BS8K
