= Open Mobile Radio Interface =

The Open Mobile Radio Interface (OMRI) is a technical interface that standardizes the communication between a phone's SoC and the apps running on it for specific digital radio / DAB+ related functionalities. It is designed to ensure that any compatible DAB+ app will work on any smartphone with the capable hardware. It was revealed 12 September 2016, at the IBC in Amsterdam.

== See also ==
- DAB+
