= RR Media =

Israeli digital media services company

RR Media (NASDAQ:RRM)
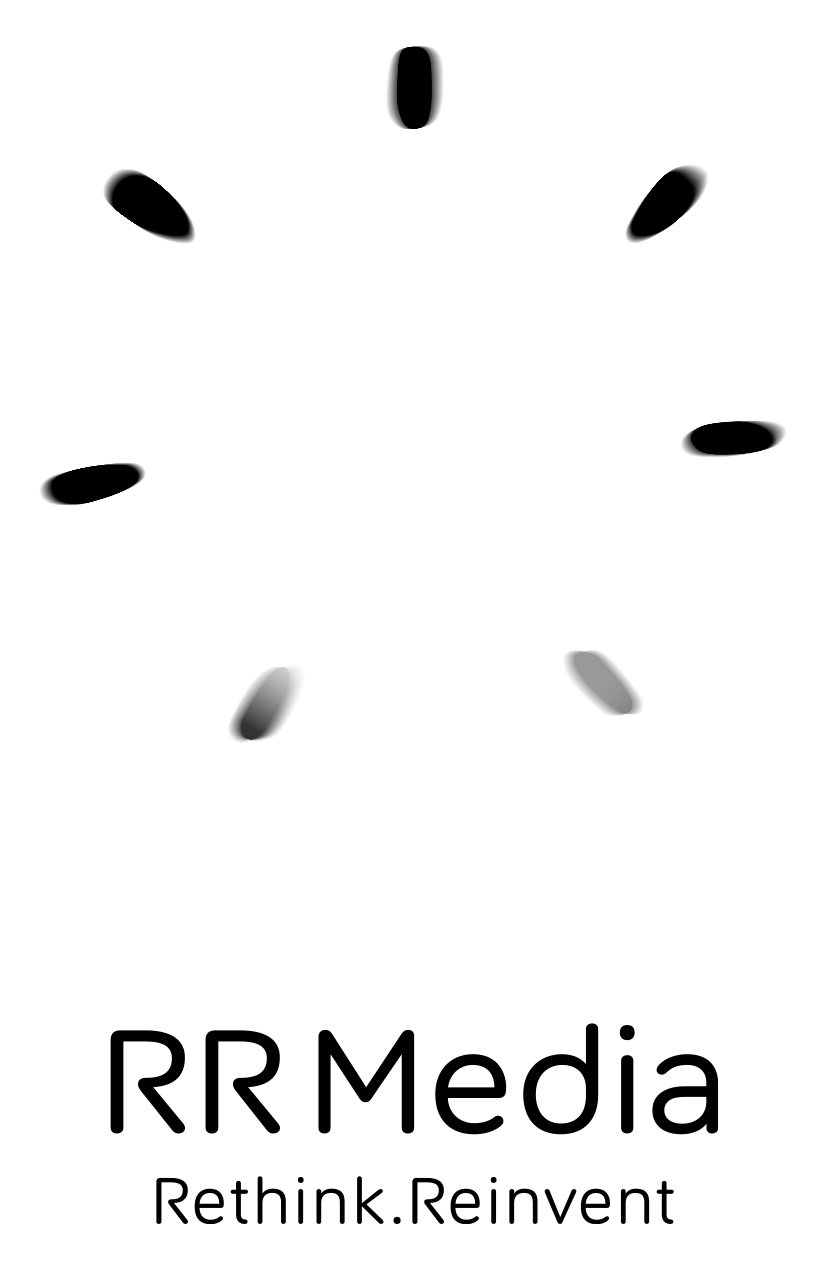
- Company type: Public (NASDAQ)
- Industry: Digital media services to the broadcast industry
- Founded: 1981
- Headquarters: Airport City Business Park, Israel
- Key people: Wilfried Urner, Chief Executive Officer; Ayal Shiran, Chairman of the Board; Shmulik Koren, Chief Financial Officer
- Revenue: ▲US$ 131.2 million (2014)
- Operating income: ▲US$ 8.2 million (2014)
- Net income: ▲US$ 6.1 million (2014)
- Website: www.rrmedia.com

RR Media was a NASDAQ listed provider of global digital media services to the broadcast industry and content owners. Its services can be divided into four main groups: global content distribution network (satellite, fiber and the internet); content management & playout; sports, news & live events; and online video services.

The company was rebranded to RR Media from RRsat in September 2014.

In February 2016, it was announced that, subject to regulatory approvals, RR Media was to be acquired by SES, based in Betzdorf, Luxembourg, and merged with SES subsidiary company, SES Platform Services a media services provider for television broadcasters, production companies and platform operators, based in Unterföhring near Munich, Germany. In July 2016, the merged company was named MX1.

== Digital media services ==
1. Global content distribution services
  RR Media's global distribution network uses a combination of satellite, fiber and the internet. The network includes satellite downlink and uplink; fiber connectivity to digital media hubs; connectivity to TV service providers; and internet-based content delivery. RR Media's network delivers live television channels, streaming media and Video on demand (VOD) content in all formats including Standard-definition television (SD), High-definition television (HD), 4K resolution (4K) & 3D television (3D).
2. End-to-end content management & playout services
  RR Media manages, prepares and plays out content from its media centers. Services include: content preparation (digitization, localization, conversion, ingest, multiple formatting, editing, restoration); content management (digital asset management, media ingest and library, streamlined workflows, metadata curation, Video on demand (VOD) delivery) and playout, channel creation, playlist management, advertising insertion/management, graphics, titles & overlay, live events operations). RR Media also creates branded or white label product television channels using live and archived materials.
3. Sports, news & live events
  RR Media delivers live sports and event content for sports rights holders, broadcasters and news channels. Services include: live production (Outside broadcasting vans, Satellite news gathering (SNG), studios), global live distribution, sports content preparation and content management, playout and origination.
  RR Media provides downlink, uplink, simultaneous translation, turnaround and live production services for sports events like football, basketball, tennis and golf, news and entertainment channels.
4. Online video services
  RR Media converts existing and archive content into programs, channels and other digital assets, and converges broadcast and internet delivery.
  Services include converged media (preparing content for broadcast or online use) Content Management Systems (CMS), VOD services, branded platforms, multi-screen delivery, web video portals and viewer measurement tools (using digital analytics).

== Media centers ==
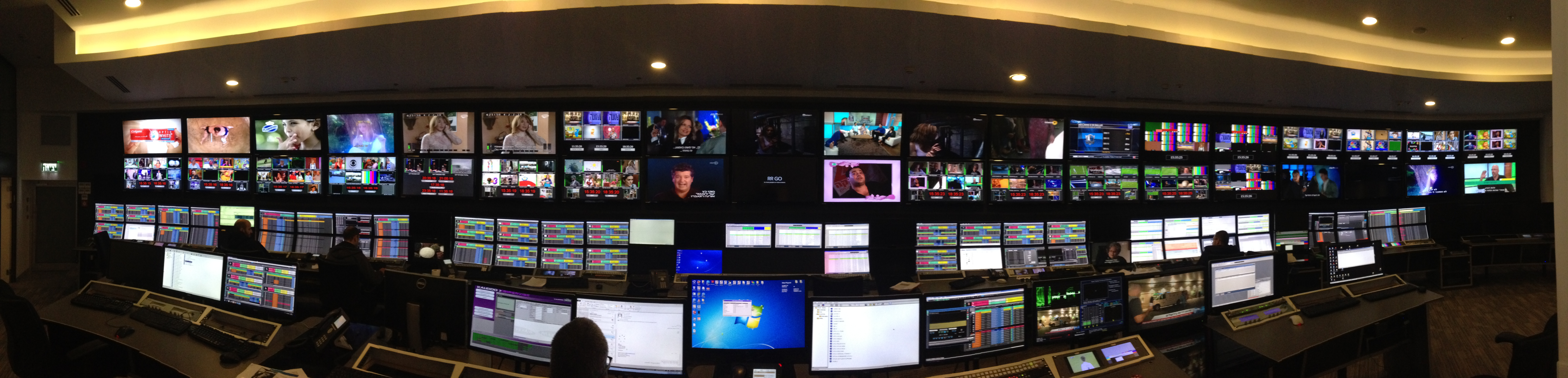
Media Center (RR Media)

RR Media's media centers are based in Hawley, PA (USA), Emeq Ha’Ela (Israel) Bucharest (Romania), with another facility opened in London, (UK) in June 2015. An additional facility in Miami, FL United States was announced in April 2016. The centers provide RR Media's services, including content preparation, management, online video, live content and distribution, and 24/7 service and support.

== Awards ==
In November 2014, RR Media won the award for Achievement in Legacy Content at the 2014 TVB Europe awards in London, in recognition for its work with British Pathe and the restoration for YouTube.

In February 2014, the World Teleport Association named Avi Cohen, CEO of RR Media (formerly RRsat), as its 2014 Teleport Executive of the Year.

In 2009, the World Teleport Association awarded RR Media (then RRsat) the Independent Teleport Operator of the Year award for excellence.

== History ==
RR Media (as RRsat) was established in 1981 as a communications provider. The company was founded by David Rivel, an electronics, computers and communications engineer. Rivel is CEO of the company for 31 years and from 2012 a Member of RR Media's board of directors.

Under management of Rivel RRsat Communications Network Ltd. went public on 2006-11-01 - NASDAQ:RRST

In 2014, the Company rebranded from RRsat Global Communications Network to RR Media. The rebrand was launched at the International Broadcasting Convention (IBC) Show in Amsterdam. In 2015, RR Media announced its NASDAQ stock ticker symbol change to RRM.

== Acquisitions ==
In April 2015, RR Media acquired Eastern Space Systems (ESS) in Romania, a privately held provider of content management and content distribution services and related consulting services.
In June 2015, RR Media acquired Satlink Communications as part of strategy to increase scale and expand its global content distribution network and content management footprint, strengthening its customer mix and leverage media industry expertise.
