= HD+ =

German television service

HD PLUS GmbH
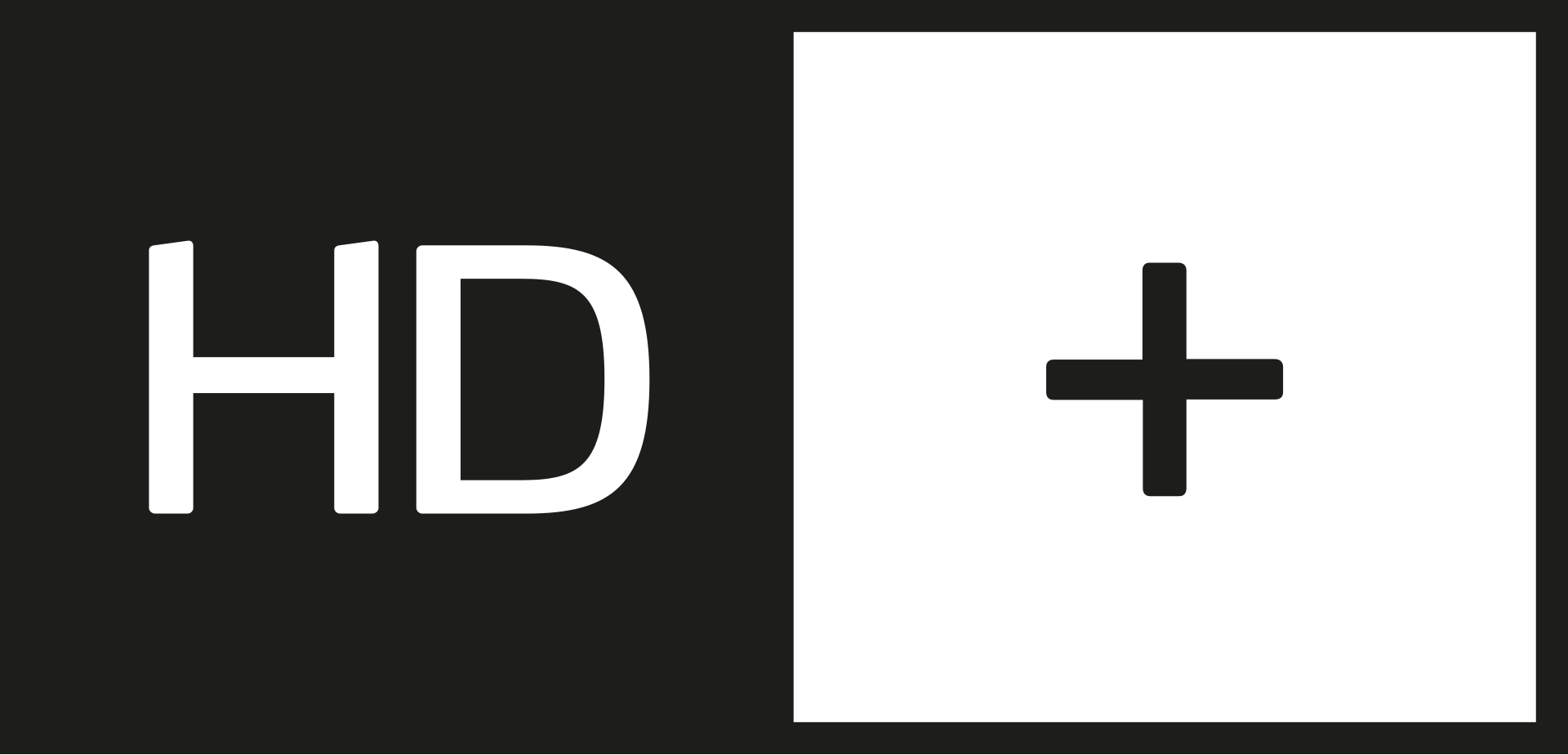
- Company type: Privately owned subsidiary
- Industry: Telecommunications
- Founded: May 2009
- Headquarters: Unterföhring, Germany
- Key people: Andreas Müller-Vondey (Managing Director)
- Products: Direct broadcast satellite
- Parent: SES S.A.
- Website: hd-plus.de

HD+ is a premium high-definition (HD) satellite and streamed TV service for German users, owned by HD PLUS GmbH, a subsidiary of SES based in Unterföhring near Munich, Germany.

HD+ carries HD and ultra-high-definition (UHD) channels outside the established pay-TV networks, broadcast encrypted from satellites at the Astra 19.2°E position direct to home satellite dishes. Reception and decryption is with a dedicated HD+ set-top box, an HD+ conditional-access module (CAM) and Smart Card in a receiver or TV set equipped with a CI+ slot, a Sky Deutschland pay-TV reception system, or certain integrated TV sets. HD+ reception systems also provide reception of free-to-air (unencrypted) HD channels from the same satellites.

In December 2021 the HD+ IP service was launched, streaming HD+ channels to viewers' TV sets through a smart TV app without the need for a dish or set-top box (but without access to UHD TV channels).

The HD PLUS GmbH company grew out of ASTRA Platform Services (later SES Platform Services, then MX1, now part of SES Video) and offers the technical management and the marketing of HD programmes for all broadcasters, including the distribution of the smart cards required for reception. In October 2014, HD+ joined the Free TV Alliance, alongside other free-to-view broadcasters Tivù Sat and Fransat, and free-to-air Freesat.

As of December 2016, there were nearly 3 million households in Germany receiving the HD+ service.

== HD+ channels ==
=== HD channels ===
- Comedy Central HD
- Crime Time HD
- Deluxe Music HD
- Deluxe Dance by Kontor HD
- Deluxe Flashback HD
- Deluxe Lounge HD
- Deluxe Rap HD
- Deluxe Rock HD
- Disney Channel HD
- DMAX HD
- Eurosport 1 HD
- HipTrips HD
- INsight TV UHD
- Just Cooking HD
- just.fishing HD
- kabel eins HD
- kabel eins Doku HD
- MTV HD
- n-tv HD
- Nickelodeon HD
- Nitro HD
- OneTerra HD
- ProSieben HD
- ProSieben Maxx HD
- Red Adventure HD
- RTL HD
- RTLup HD
- RTL Zwei HD
- Sat.1 HD
- Sat.1 Gold HD
- Serien+ HD
- Sixx HD
- SPORT1 HD
- Super RTL HD
- Tele5 HD
- TLC HD
- VOX HD
- VOXup
- WELT HD
- xplore HD

=== UHD channels ===
- RTL UHD
- ProSiebenSat.1 UHD
- UHD1

=== History of HD+ channel line-up ===
The HD+ service launched on November 1, 2009, with two channels, RTL HD and Vox HD. Sat.1 HD, ProSieben HD and kabel eins HD were added on January 31, 2010.

Sport1 HD (previously DSF) joined the service on the first anniversary of the launch of HD+, on November 1, 2010, becoming the first channel in the HD+ package from outside the RTL and ProSiebenSat.1 groups. On December 1, 2010, HD versions of German women's entertainment channel sixx (owned by ProSiebenSat.1 Media) and entertainment channel RTL II launched in HD on HD+. In June 2011, Comedy Central and nickelodeon from MTV Networks joined the HD+ platform and it was announced that news channel, N24 would join HD+ from July, bringing the number of channels offered to 11.

In October 2011 Tele5 HD launched on HD+ and on May 1, 2012, Super RTL launched a high definition version of the RTL/Disney owned channel on the HD+ platform alongside Discovery's DMAX channel. The 15th channel to join HD+ was adult pop music channel Deluxe Music, in December 2012.

Disney Channel HD left the German pay-TV platform, Sky Deutschland in November 2013 to relaunch on HD+ on January 17, 2014, as an advertising-financed service. In April 2014 HD+ added the news channel n-tv HD, male orientated entertainment channels ProSieben Maxx HD and RTL Nitro HD, and women's lifestyle channel TLC HD to the line-up, bringing the total number of channels in the service to 20.

In the months leading up to the launch of HD+, it had been reported that MTV – already broadcasting in HD from Astra 19.2°E – was in discussions to join the package but it was only some six years after those discussions, on September 1, 2014, that MTV HD left the Sky Deutschland pay-TV platform and became the 21st channel to join HD+. However, MTV HD was not available for customers that viewed HD+ via Sky Deutschland (as there was no VideoGuard encryption enabled for MTV HD) until 21 October 2015. In October, the number of channels was reduced back to 20 when Viacom reorganized its channels in Germany. Comedy Central was no longer available via HD+ and Nickelodeon, which previously shared its channel with Comedy Central, increased its broadcast hours to 24 hours a day.

On January 1, 2015, the women's channel Sat.1 Gold started broadcasting in HD on the HD+ platform, the last of ProSiebenSat.1's SD channels to launch in HD

In September 2015, HD+ started broadcasts of the ultra-high-definition television (UHD) demonstration channel, UHD1, showing sports, culture, lifestyle, and nature video clips and trailers.

On October 4, 2016, INsight TV HD, an action and extreme sports channel from TV Entertainment Reality Network (TERN) became the 22nd HD+ channel and on December 1, 2016, Eurosport 1 HD started broadcasting on the HD+ platform. In August 2017 Eurosport announced that HD+ subscribers could add access to live sports coverage on the Eurosport 2 HD Xtra channel for an additional €5/month.

In December 2017, Travelxp joined HD+, broadcasting in Ultra HD and HDR (the first travel channel worldwide to use HDR) but left the service in April 2020. RTL launched its own UHD channel on April 28, 2018, distributed exclusively via HD+.

In March 2019 Comedy Central returned to HD+, replacing Nickelodeon.

In August 2021, the ProSiebenSat.1 UHD channel was launched on HD+, broadcasting UHD content from channels, Sat.1, ProSieben, Kabel Eins, ProSieben Maxx and Kabel Eins Doku.

In November 2021, RTLup HD (previously RTLplus) and VOXup HD were added to the platform, bringing the number of HD channels to 26.

In November 2023, 13 HD channels from German media company High View were added to the HD+ offering at no extra cost to subscribers. The new Variety+ package comprises three entertainment channels (Crime Time HD, Serien+ HD and Red Adventure HD), five music channels (Deluxe Rock HD, Deluxe Flashback HD, Deluxe Dance by Kontor HD, Deluxe Rap HD and Deluxe Lounge HD), two lifestyle channels (Just Cooking HD, just.fishing HD), and three documentary channels (xplore HD, HipTrips HD and OneTerra HD).

== Service fees and reception equipment ==
Included in the purchase price of HD+ reception equipment is an HD+ smart card valid for a free introductory trial of all channels in the HD+ service. At the launch of the HD+ service the trial period was 12 months; this was reduced to 6 months in November 2013. At the end of the free viewing period, the validity of the card can be extended for a further year on payment of the annual service fee (€50 at the time of the service launch), either direct to HD+ or in stores. In May 2014 the annual service fee, after expiry of the free viewing period, was increased from €50 to €60 and a monthly payment plan of €5.00/month was introduced. In February 2017, the annual subscription was increased to €70 and the monthly fee raised to €5.75. In March 2021, subscription fees were raised to €75 (annual) and €6 (monthly).

Initially, the main route to HD+ reception was with the set-top boxes especially designed for HD+, connected to a satellite dish pointing at Astra 19.2°E, with an HD+ Nagravision smart card. Other satellite receivers or TV sets equipped with a CI+ slot can be fitted with an HD+ conditional-access module (CAM), bought from HD+ or in stores along with the HD+ smart card.

Since June 2011, all the HD+ channels have been additionally encrypted with VideoGuard to be available to Sky Deutschland subscribers without any HD+ equipment. Sky subscribers with a standard Sky HD satellite receiver and smartcard are able to watch and record the HD+ channels, along with the Sky HD channels and free-to-air German HD channels which also broadcast from Astra 19.2°E.

Since September 2011, HD+ channels can also be received via Entertain Sat from Deutsche Telekom and, since January 2013, thanks to an agreement with the German broadcasting and broadband communications association (FRK), via some small and medium-sized cable networks.

In March 2019 Panasonic launched the first commercial deployment of the HbbTV Operator App enabling Panasonic 2019 OLED and UHD smart TVs connected to an Astra 19.2°E dish and to the internet, to receive HD+ services without a set-top box, CI module or smartcard. Two weeks after Panasonic's introduction of the app, Samsung also offered the app's integrated access to HD+ on its 2019 TVs. Other makes of TV followed - various branded TVs from Vestel in 2020, Philips-branded TVs from TP Vision in 2021, Hisense and Loewe in 2022. and LG in 2023

In April 2021, Sony provided direct access to HD+ for all its Google TV models using an Android app.

HD+ IP, launched as a separate offering in December 2021, provides (as of February 2022) 78 HD channels, including free-to-air channels and regional variations, and catch-up and interactive services via a smart TV app on Panasonic TVs, without the need for a dish or set-top box for €6/month (with one month free trial).

== Online and streamed services ==
In December 2012, HD+ launched the RePlay catch-up TV service, offering full-length programmes up to seven days after their first DTH broadcast. A hybrid broadcast/online system, RePlay required an HbbTV-based HD+ set-top box or, from 2014, the RePlay app on some smart TVs, and carried a subscription fee of €15 per quarter (after a free trial period).

Paying extra for catch-up TV proved not to be popular and in 2018, HD+ RePlay was replaced by the free HD+ Komfort-Funktion integrated in various Panasonic, Samsung, and branded Vestel TV sets. Komfort-Funktion allows some programs to be re-started and watched from the beginning and provides access to selected channels’ media libraries, with an interactive TV guide and customized search function. TVs providing HD+ via the HbbTV Operator App also provide the Komfort-Funktion.

In 2017 (February for iOS, August for Android), HD+ launched the ExtraScreen second screen service which enables households with a Humax 4tune+ set-top box and active HD+ card to stream HD channels from the set-top box to smartphones and tablets running the HD+ Connect app, or to the Humax H1 media player, at no extra charge. The set-top-box distributes encrypted and free-to-air channels via the household's local Wi-Fi network to the mobile devices using Sat-IP, independent of the channel showing on the connected TV set.

In September 2021, the HD+ ToGo app for Android and iOS smartphones and tablets was launched giving existing subscribers access to the HD channels, along with catch-up services, instant restart, TV guide, search function, recommendations, etc., on mobile devices away from home. The service can be used on up to five different devices with two viewers streaming simultaneously, and costs €5 per month additional subscription, with a 30-day free trial period.

In December 2021 the HD+ IP service was launched, streaming the major public and commercial TV channels in HD as well as catch-up services and interactive features, such as restarting programmes, TV guide and a search function, via a smart TV app on Panasonic TVs, without the need for a dish or set-top box.

In December 2024, HD+ launched the HD+ Stream app for mobile viewing of HD channels and programmes. HD+ Stream combines HD+ ToGo and HD+ IP to provide over 80 public and commercial channels and catch-up services in HD for viewing on a compatible smart TV or mobile device. Subscription to HD+ Stream costs €8.99 per month with a free seven-day test period, and is independent of other HD+ subscriptions.

In May 2024, the HD+ ToGo service was expanded and rebranded as HD+ MultiScreen, offering viewing and access to catch-up services on three devices simultaneously (previously two): the main TV, mobile devices or additional TVs via Apple Airplay or Google Chromecast. Subscription to HD+ MultiScreen costs €3 per month (previously €5).

== Service criticism, accolades and uptake ==
In the lead-up to, and after the launch of HD+, there was some criticism of the service because of the amount of content actually made in HD. Although initially, mainly only US movies and US series were broadcast in native HD, the proportion of HD programmes broadcast increased. By 2013, most in-house productions and almost all major sports events were produced and broadcast in HD. By May 2013, RTL HD was broadcasting more than 90 percent of its programming in native HD and by the end of 2014 ProSiebenSat1 Media AG broadcast "with a few exceptions, the entire prime time lineup of Sat1 HD, ProSieben HD, Kabel eins HD and sixx HD in native HD".

The decision to charge for access to the HD+ package, while promoting it as free TV, and the limitations imposed on the service's use (some channels announced they were going to deny the viewer the ability to record broadcasts to watch later or fast-forwarding during commercials) was met with some criticism within Germany. However, Ferdinand Kayser, then president and CEO of SES Astra, denied that HD+ is pay-TV. "HD+ is free TV," he said in September 2009 at the IFA consumer electronics show in Berlin, and compared the commercial arrangements to cable TV, in which access to free channels costs money. He said that the annual cost of HD+ is a service fee "which is related to the reception of the offer and not to specific content, parts or packages of the offer".

HD+ has achieved several awards in German specialist publications. In 2018 Video Magazin gave HD+ a "very good" test rating, in 2019, the HD+ HbbTV Operator App in Panasonic's integrated HD+ TV sets was awarded "Best use of HbbTV for operator applications" by the HbbTV Association, and the integration of HD+ into TV sets and the HD+ Komfort-Funktion has received the test rating "very good" in Audiovision (issue 6/2019), Digital Television (8/2019), Satvision (6/2019) and Video (7/2019), "top notch" in av-magazin.de (issue 8/2019), and "innovation" in Sat-Magazin (issue 3/2019).

In May 2011 – some 18 months after the launch of the service – HD+ CEO, Wilfried Urner said that "In a country where the question of whether people are willing to pay for television has been discussed for more than 20 years, the first figures of HD+ are certainly remarkable. A conversion rate of 66 percent is clearly above the expectations, and the active renewal of the HD+ service by so many people after one year is an outstanding result".

In the first few years after the launch of the service, the uptake of HD+ was as follows:

Date	Total households receiving HD+	Households paying the HD+ service fee
March 2011	769,000	114,000"
May 2012	2.6 million	>500,000
October 2012	2,8 million	>750,000
February 2013		>1 million
October 2014	2.9 million	1.59 million
December 2014	3.1 million	1.65 million
December 2015	2.95 million	1.84 million
December 2016	2.96 million	2.11 million

== Austria ==
The equivalent of HD+ in Austria is HD Austria.

== See also ==
- SES (operator)
- Astra satellite family
- SES Platform Services
- Satellite television
- Television in Germany
