= WarnerTV Serie =

German pay television channel

- Country: Germany
- Broadcast area: Europe
- Headquarters: Munich, Germany

Programming
- Languages: German; English
- Picture format: 1080i HDTV

Ownership
- Owner: Warner Bros. Discovery EMEA
- Sister channels: WarnerTV Film; WarnerTV Comedy; Cartoon Network; Cartoonito; CNN International

History
- Launched: 28 January 2009; 17 years ago (as TNT Serie); 25 September 2021; 4 years ago (as WarnerTV Serie)
- Former names: TNT Serie (2009–2021)

Links
- Website: www.warnertv.de/serie

WarnerTV Serie (formerly TNT Serie) is a German pay television channel dedicated to broadcast television series. The channel changed its name to WarnerTV Serie on 25 September 2021, after an announcement made on 14 June that year.

== Distribution ==
The station was operated by Turner Broadcasting System Europe and launched on 28 January 2009. Since 1 June 2009, the channel has broadcast around the clock.

In August 2013, SES Platform Services (later MX1, now part of SES Video) won an international tender by Turner Broadcasting System, to provide playout services for TNT Serie, and for Cartoon Network, Boomerang, CNN International, TNT Film and TNT Comedy (in both SD and HD) for the German-speaking market, digitisation of existing Turner content, and playout for Turner on-demand and catch-up services in Germany, Austria, Switzerland the Benelux region, from November 2013.

== Programming ==
- Alert: Missing Persons Unit (2024–2025)
- 2 Broke Girls (2014–2016)
- 4 Blocks (2017–2021, 2023)
- 30 Rock (2009–2014)
- Add a Friend (2012–2014)
- Agent X (2015–2016)
- Airwolf (2017–2020)
- Animal Kingdom (2017–2022)
- APB (APB - Die Hightech-Cops) (2017–2020)
- Arrow (2015–2017)
- Batman: The Animated Series (2017)
- The Big Bang Theory (2012–2015)
- Big Love (2009–2013)
- The Black Donnellys (2009–2011)
- Blindspot (2024–present)
- Boardwalk Empire (2011–2013)
- The Bold and the Beautiful (Reich und Schön) (2022–2023)
- Boston Legal (2016–2020)
- The Calling (2022–2024)
- Caprica (2011-2013)
- Caroline in the City (2009–2011)
- Channel Zero (2018–2021)
- The Closer (2015–2020)
- Cold Case (Cold Case - Kein Opfer ist je vergessen) (2010–2019)
- Colony (2017–2019)
- Columbo (2015–2021)
- Daktari (2025–present)
- Dawson's Creek (2011–2013)
- ER (Emergency Room – Die Notaufnahme) (2009–2014)
- Everybody Loves Raymond (Alle lieben Raymond) (2009–2013)
- Falling Skies (2011–present)
- The Fixer (2017–2019)
- The Flash (2016–2023)
- The Frankenstein Chronicles (2016–2017)
- Friday Night Lights (2009–2014)
- Friends (2010–2016)
- Fringe (Fringe - Grenzfälle des FBI) (2012–2014; 2025–present)
- Game of Thrones (2011–2017)
- Gilmore Girls (2009–2013, 2016–2017)
- Good Behavior (2016–2017)
- Grey's Anatomy (2016–2017)
- The King of Queens (King of Queens) (2009–2016)
- Hart to Hart (Hart aber herzlich) (2014–2016)
- Hell on Wheels (2013–2017)
- Hot in Cleveland (2014–2016)
- Hudson & Rex (2019–present)
- Instinct (2018–2022)
- JAG (J.A.G. - Im Auftrag der Ehre) (2018)
- Knight Rider (2011–2016)
- The Last Ship (2014–2018)
- Little House on the Prairie (2019–present)
- Major Crimes (2014–2020)
- McLeod's Daughters (McLeods Töchter) (2016–2022)
- Men at Work (2013–2016)
- The Millers (2014–2016)
- Monday Mornings (2013–2014, 2016, 2018–2019, 2021)
- Monk (2009–2024)
- Murder, She Wrote (Mord ist ihr Hobby) (2009–present)
- Murder in the First (2014–2016)
- NCIS (2021–present)
- NCIS: Los Angeles (2021–present)
- Nip/Tuck (Nip/Tuck – Schönheit hat ihren Preis) (2009–2011)
- Northern Exposure (Ausgerechnet Alaska)
- NTSF:SD:SUV:: (2012, 2014–present)
- The O.C. (O.C., California) (2016–2017)
- Parenthood (2016–2017)
- Parks and Recreation (2014–2016)
- Person of Interest (2023–present)
- Pretty Little Liars (2016–2017)
- Psych (2009–2013)
- Public Morals (2015)
- Reign (2016–2017)
- Revenge (2016–2017)
- Rescue Me (2009–2014)
- Rizzoli & Isles (2012–present)
- Salem (2014–2017)
- SEAL Team (2018–present)
- Seinfeld (2009–2015)
- Signos (Im Zeichen der Rache) (2016–2018)
- Six Feet Under (Six Feet Under – Gestorben wird immer) (2009–2010)
- Smallville (2009–2012)
- The Son (2017–2019)
- The Starter Wife (The Starter Wife – Alles auf Anfang) (2010–2012)
- Tell Me You Love Me (2009–2010)
- Third Watch (Third Watch – Einsatz am Limit) (2009–2011)
- Those Who Can't (2016)
- 'Til Death (Ehe ist ...) (2009–2013)
- Titanic: Blood and Steel (2013–2015)
- Treadstone (2022–2024)
- Two and a Half Men (2010–2016)
- Weinberg (2015–2016)
- White Collar (2023–present)
- Will (2016–2022)
- Without a Trace (Without a Trace – Spurlos verschwunden) (2009–2011, 2017–2018)
- The Wonder Years (Wunderbare Jahre) (2018–2019)

=== Adult Swim ===
- Aqua Teen Hunger Force (2009–2011, 2014–2017)
- Assy McGee (2010–2011, 2014–2015)
- The Brak Show (2009, 2012–2016)
- China, IL (2016–2017)
- Lucy, the Daughter of the Devil (2009–2017)
- Metalocalypse (2010–2012, 2014–2015)
- Moral Orel (2009–2011, 2014–2016)
- Rick and Morty (2014–2016)
- Robot Chicken (2009–2012, 2014–2017)
- Stroker & Hoop (2009–2011, 2013–2016)
- The Venture Bros. (2009, 2014–2016)
- Your Pretty Face Is Going to Hell (2016–2017)

=== Sports ===
- Lucha Underground (2016–2019)

== Logos ==
TNT Serie – 2009 – 30 May 2016

TNT Serie HD – 11 October 2010 – 30 May 2016

TNT Serie – 1 June 2016 – 24 September 2021

TNT Serie HD – 1 June 2016 – 24 September 2021

WarnerTV Serie – since 25 September 2021

WarnerTV Serie HD – since 25 September 2021
