= WarnerTV Comedy =

German TV channel

- Country: Germany
- Broadcast area: Europe
- Headquarters: Munich, Germany

Programming
- Language: German
- Picture format: 1080i HDTV

Ownership
- Owner: Warner Bros. Discovery EMEA
- Sister channels: WarnerTV Serie; WarnerTV Film; Cartoon Network; Cartoonito; CNN International

History
- Launched: 8 May 2012; 14 years ago (as glitz*); 1 April 2014; 12 years ago (as TNT Glitz); 1 June 2016; 10 years ago (as TNT Comedy); 25 September 2021; 5 years ago (as WarnerTV Comedy)
- Former names: Glitz* (2012-2014); TNT Glitz (2014-2016); TNT Comedy (2016-2021)

Links
- Website: www.warnertv.de/comedy

WarnerTV Comedy is a German pay television channel, originally launched on 8 May 2012 as glitz*. It is owned by Warner Bros. Discovery International.

In August 2013, SES Platform Services (later MX1, now part of SES Video) won an international tender by Turner Broadcasting System, to provide playout services for Glitz, Boomerang, Cartoon Network, TNT Film and TNT Serie for the German-speaking market, digitisation of existing Turner content, and playout for Turner on-demand and catch-up services in Germany, Austria, Switzerland the Benelux region, from November 2013.

On April 1, 2014 the channel was renamed TNT Glitz and started broadcasting via satellite on Sky Germany. The slogan Here shines the sun ("Hier scheint die Sonne") was changed to We are pink ("Wir sind pink").

The channel changed its name from TNT Comedy to WarnerTV Comedy on September 25, 2021, after the ad made on June 14 that same year.

== Logos ==
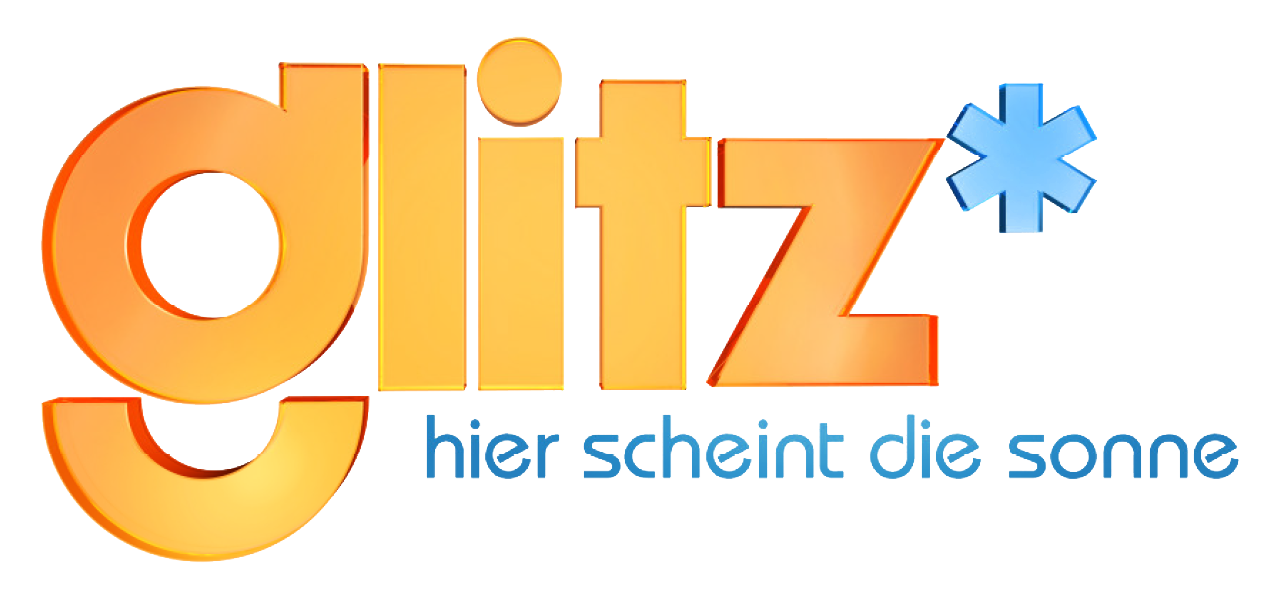
Glitz – 2012 - 2014

TNT Glitz – 2014 - 2016

TNT Glitz HD – 2014 - 2016

TNT Comedy – 2016 - 2021

TNT Comedy HD – 2016 - 2021

WarnerTV Comedy – since 2021

WarnerTV Comedy HD – since 2021
