= WarnerTV Film =

- Country: Germany
- Broadcast area: Europe
- Headquarters: Munich, Germany

Programming
- Language: German
- Picture format: 1080i HDTV

Ownership
- Owner: Warner Bros. Discovery EMEA
- Sister channels: WarnerTV Comedy; WarnerTV Serie; Cartoon Network; Cartoonito; CNN International

History
- Launched: 5 December 2006; 19 years ago (as Turner Classic Movies); 4 July 2009; 17 years ago (as TNT Film); 25 September 2021; 4 years ago (as Warner TV Film)
- Former names: Turner Classic Movies (2006–2009); TNT Film (2009–2021)

Links
- Website: www.warnertv.de/film

Availability

Streaming media
- Magine TV (Germany): -

HD Logo

WarnerTV Film, formerly Turner Classic Movies (TCM) and TNT Film, is a German pay television channel owned by Warner Bros. Discovery International. The channel broadcasts movies both in their original language and dubbed into German.

The channel launched on the Arena satellite platform with a full 24-hour schedule in December 2006 as Turner Classic Movies. It has later become available from other distributors, including Premiere from September 2007. On July 4, 2009, the channel was rebranded as TNT Film and started to feature recent films more prominently. The channel also switched to the 16:9 widescreen aspect ratio.

The channel changed its name to WarnerTV Film on September 25, 2021, after the ad made on June 14 that same year.

== Broadcasting ==
In August 2013, SES Platform Services (later MX1, now part of SES Video) won an international tender by Turner Broadcasting System, to provide playout services for TNT Film, and for TNT Serie, TNT Glitz, Cartoon Network, Boomerang and CNN International (in both SD and HD) for the German-speaking market, digitization of existing Turner content, and playout for Turner on-demand and catch-up services in Germany, Austria, Switzerland the Benelux region, from November 2013.

M7 Group's Kabelkiosk stopped broadcasting of TNT Film on 1 March 2017.

== Logos ==
Turner Classic Movies – until July 4, 2009

TNT Film – July 5, 2009 – May 31, 2016

TNT Film HD – 5 July 2009 – 31 May 2016

TNT Film – June 1, 2016 – September 24, 2021

TNT Film HD – 1 June 2016 – 24 September 2021

WarnerTV Film – since September 25, 2021

== Audience share ==
	January	February	March	April	May	June	July	August	September	October	November	December	Annual average
2012	-	-	0.0%	0.0%	0.0%	0.0%	0.0%	0.0%	0.0%	0.0%	0.0%	0.0%	0.0%
2013	0.0%	0.0%	0.1%	0.1%	0.1%	0.1%	0.1%	0.1%	0.0%	0.1%	0.1%	0.1%	▲0.1%
2014	0.1%	0.1%	0.1%	0.1%	0.1%	0.1%	0.1%	0.1%	0.0%	0.1%	0.1%	0.1%	0.1%
2015	0.1%	0.1%	0.1%	0.1%	0.1%	0.1%	0.1%	0.1%	0.1%	0.1%	0.0%	0.1%	0.1%
2016	0.1%	0.1%	0.1%	0.0%	0.0%	0.1%	0.1%	0.1%	0.1%	0.1%	0.1%	0.1%	0.1%
2017	0.1%	0.1%	0.1%	0.1%	0.1%	0.1%	0.1%	0.1%	0.1%	0.1%			
