= Deluxe Music =

Programming
- Picture format: 576i (16:9 SDTV); 1080i (HDTV)

Ownership
- Owner: High View Holding
- Sister channels: Deluxe Dance by Kontor; Deluxe Lounge; Deluxe Rap; Schlager Deluxe

History
- Launched: 1 April 2005; 20 years ago

Links
- Website: www.deluxemusic.tv www.highview.com

Deluxe Music is a German free-to-air music television channel, operated by Just Music Fernsehbetriebs and owned by High View Holding. The channel was founded in 2004 by the German media entrepreneurs Markus Langemann and Cosmin Ene and started broadcasting on 1 April 2005. The target audience is 25-year-olds and older.

The channel specializes in a varied range of music styles. In the daytime it plays more popular music, and broadcasts more specific styles at night, such as disco or rock.

The channel is broadcast on the Astra 19.2 satellite, as well as on cable systems. A HD version was launched in December 2012, as part of the HD+ package.

In January 2012, Deluxe Television filed for insolvency. In March 2012, it was bought by the High View group.

In January 2020, a new specialty channel focused on Schlager music called Schlager Deluxe was given its broadcasting license. Test broadcasts of this channel began in July 2020 and the station launched full 24/7 broadcasting in December of the same year.

In January 2023, High View announced an agreement with Astra satellite operator, SES, to lease additional capacity for four new music channels, Deluxe Dance by Kontor, Deluxe Flashback, Deluxe Rock and Deluxe Rap. The new channels started on 1 February 2023 and broadcast free-to-air.

In October 2023, Deluxe Lounge started broadcasting free-to-air on Astra 19.2°E.

== Logo history ==
Logo until January 30th 2013

Logo until February 12th 2019

HD logo until February 12th 2019

== Audience share ==
=== Germany ===
	January	February	March	April	May	June	July	August	September	October	November	December	Annual average
2013	-	-	-	-	0.1%	0.1%	0.1%	0.0%	0.0%	0.0%	0.0%	0.1%	
2014	0.1%	0.1%	0.0%	0.1%	0.1%	0.1%	0.1%	0.1%	0.1%	0.1%	0.1%	0.1%	
2015	0.1%	0.1%	0.0%	0.1%	0.1%	0.1%	0.1%	0.1%	0.1%	0.1%	0.1%	0.2%	0.1%
2016	0.2%	0.2%	0.2%	0.1%	0.1%	0.1%	0.1%	0.2%	0.2%	0.2%	0.2%	0.2%	▲0.2%
2017	0.2%	0.2%	0.2%	0.2%	0.2%	0.3%							
