= Add a Friend =

2012 German television series

- Genre: Comedy-Drama
- Written by: Sebastian Wehlings; Christian Lyra
- Starring: Ken Duken; Friedrich Mücke; Friederike Kempter; Emilia Schüle; Gisela Schneeberger; Dietrich Hollinderbäumer; Ralph Herforth; Jo Kern
- Country of origin: Germany
- Original language: German
- No. of seasons: 3
- No. of episodes: 30

Production
- Executive producers: Quirin Berg; Max Wiedemann
- Producer: Eva Stadler
- Production locations: Munich, Bavaria
- Running time: approx. 25 Minutes
- Production companies: Bavaria Film; Wiedemann & Berg Television

Original release
- Network: TNT Serie
- Release: September 19, 2012 – December 8, 2014

Add a Friend is a German comedy-drama created and written by Sebastian Wehlings and Christian Lyra for TNT Serie. The series follows a group of people and their lives in the social network.

This is the first German production produced exclusively for premium television. A first season consisting of ten episodes were ordered. Add a Friend is set to premiere on September 19, 2012, on Wednesday nights at 8:15 pm.

== Synopsis ==
After Felix (Ken Duken) had a car accident he is left bedridden with a complicated leg fracture. His sole window to the outside world becomes his laptop. Via his social network he stays in contact with his best friend Tom (Friedrich Mücke) and gets in touch with his old high-school crush Julia (Friederike Kempter). Then there is the mysterious girl Vanessa (Emilia Schüle) and Felix' parents, Gisela (Gisela Schneeberger) and Gerd (Dieter Hollinder), who he only has contact to through video chat.

== Cast ==
- Ken Duken as Felix
- Friedrich Mücke as Tom
- Friederike Kempter as Julia
- Emilia Schüle as Vanessa
- Gisela Schneeberger as Gisela
- Dietrich Hollinderbäumer as Gerd
- Ralph Herforth as Marc
- Jo Kern as Rita

== Production ==
After the announcement of the first television series by Turner Broadcasting System in Germany, the production could win actor Ken Duken, who's internationally known for his performance in Inglourious Basterds and started filming a 10-episode season in January 2012. The production ended after almost two months at the end of February.
