= Cartoonito (Central and Eastern Europe) =

Central European television channel

- Country: United Kingdom; Germany
- Broadcast area: Balkans; Baltics (except Latvia, which switched to Cartoonito (Western Europe); Benelux; CIS; Georgia; Central Europe; Central and Eastern Europe; East-Central Europe; Eastern Europe
- Headquarters: London, United Kingdom; Munich, Germany

Programming
- Languages: Dutch; English; German; Hungarian; Polish; Romanian; Russian; Bulgarian; Czech (continuity in English); Slovenian (continuity in English); Serbian (continuity in English); Croatian (continuity in English)
- Picture format: 1080i HDTV (downscaled to 16:9 576i for the SDTV feed)

Ownership
- Owner: Skydance Corporation
- Parent: Skydance Corporation
- Sister channels: Cartoon Network; Cartoon Network WE; Cartoonito France; CNN International; WarnerTV Comedy; WarnerTV Film; WarnerTV Serie

History
- Launched: 12 October 2011; 14 years ago (as a block); 4 January 2023; 3 years ago (as a channel)
- Replaced: Boomerang EMEA; Boomerang Germany
- Closed: 14 December 2021; 4 years ago (Latvia); 9 March 2022; 4 years ago (Russia) (Note: Due to the ongoing Russian invasion of Ukraine)
- Former names: Boomerang (2011–2023)

Links
- Website: www.cartoonito.de (Dead link, redirect to the Warner Bros. Discovery website)

Availability

Streaming media
- Netherlands: Ziggo GO
- Ukraine: Sweet.tv

Cartoonito, formerly Boomerang, is a children's television channel owned by the EMEA division of Skydance Corporation that operates in Central and Eastern Europe and CIS and formerly Russia.

== History ==
=== As part of Boomerang (2011–2023) ===
First logo, used from 5 June 2005 to 2 February 2015

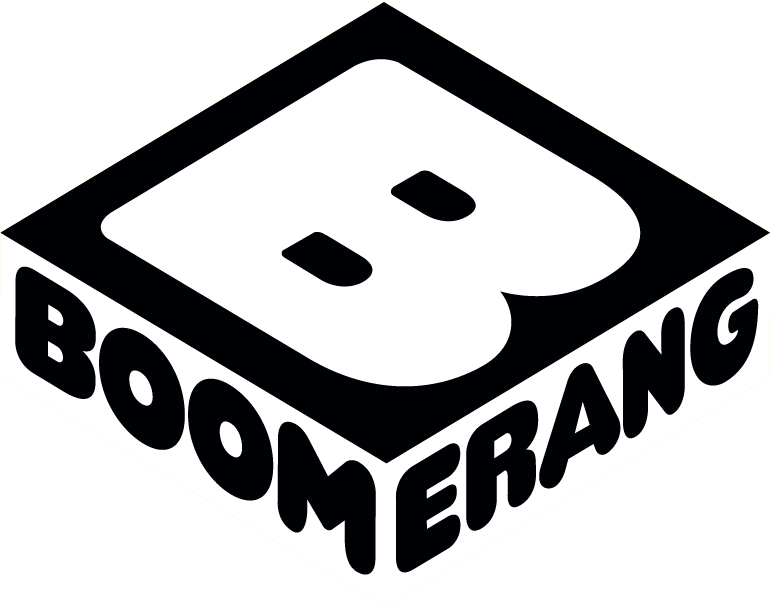
Second logo, used from 2 February 2015 to 18 March 2023

On 12 October 2011, at 6:00 am (CEST), it was split into two different feeds: this feed focused on Central and Eastern Europe, while Boomerang HQ centred on the Benelux, Cyprus, Czech Republic, Greece, Middle East & Africa, and Portugal. The European feed at the time consisted of four audio tracks, which were in English, Romanian, Hungarian and Polish. On 1 August 2007, TV channel began broadcasting from the Astra 1K and Hot Bird 7A satellites in the territories of the CIS and Baltic countries. The TV channel was partially broadcast in Russian. Since 1 October 2013, the channel has been completely dubbed into Russian.

Between November 2014 and February 2015, Boomerang CEE replaced Boomerang HQ in the Netherlands and Belgium, and got a localized Dutch feed between 2 February 2015 and 2017. Since 2017 the CEE feed is available in the Netherlands and Belgium.

On 4 April 2018, Boomerang CEE switched to the 16:9 aspect ratio. On 1 October 2018, Boomerang CEE replaced Boomerang Germany and took over its channel slot. It launched a subfeed intended to air German advertisements and has no Russian rating icons being displayed in its broadcast, differing from the main feed. Sometimes they were shown anyway because of mistakes.

Since 10 November 2020, Boomerang has received a Czech licence (RRTV) in order to ensure the continuation of legal broadcasting in the European Union in accordance with the EU Directive on Audiovisual Media Services (AVMSD) and the law on the single market after the UK leaves the European Union. Since the Czech Republic has minimum broadcasting rules, it was chosen for licensing purposes in the EU. Broadcasting centre of the TV channel is still located in London.

On Monday, 1 November 2021, Boomerang CEE launched a new Bulgarian-language audio track, as well as a Bulgarian channel sub-feed for Bulgarian television advertisement commercials, currently available only on Bulsatcom and A1 Bulgaria. On Friday, 3 December 2021, Boomerang CEE launched a new Czech-language audio track.

Due to the Russian invasion of Ukraine, on 9 March 2022, WarnerMedia closed the channel in Russian territories, along with Cartoon Network.

=== As Cartoonito (2023–present) ===
Cartoonito began as programming block in 2011 targeting preschoolers. It aired weekday mornings and afternoons until 2014, when all Cartoonito programming merged into Boomerang's schedule. On 8 August 2022, it was announced that Cartoonito would be returning to Boomerang CEE as part of the brand's 2021 relaunch.

The block officially returned on 1 September 2022, airing from 8am to 2pm CEST. On 4 January 2023, it was announced that Boomerang CEE would fully rebrand into a dedicated Cartoonito channel on 18 March 2023.

After the decisions, the Czech regulator (RRTV) chose to stop airing the channel in Latvia and changed to the Scandinavian version of Cartoonito, on 17 April 2023 (officially 1 May 2023), but it has long been removed from the cable operator's register in Latvia, in December 2021, because it has not been used by any TV provider in recent years.

== See also ==
- Cartoonito Western Europe - Western coast counterpart
- The Cartoon Network, Inc.
- List of programs broadcast by Cartoonito
