= NHK Science & Technology Research Laboratories =

Technical research centre in Tokyo, Japan

Coordinates: 35.63587°N 139.61565°E

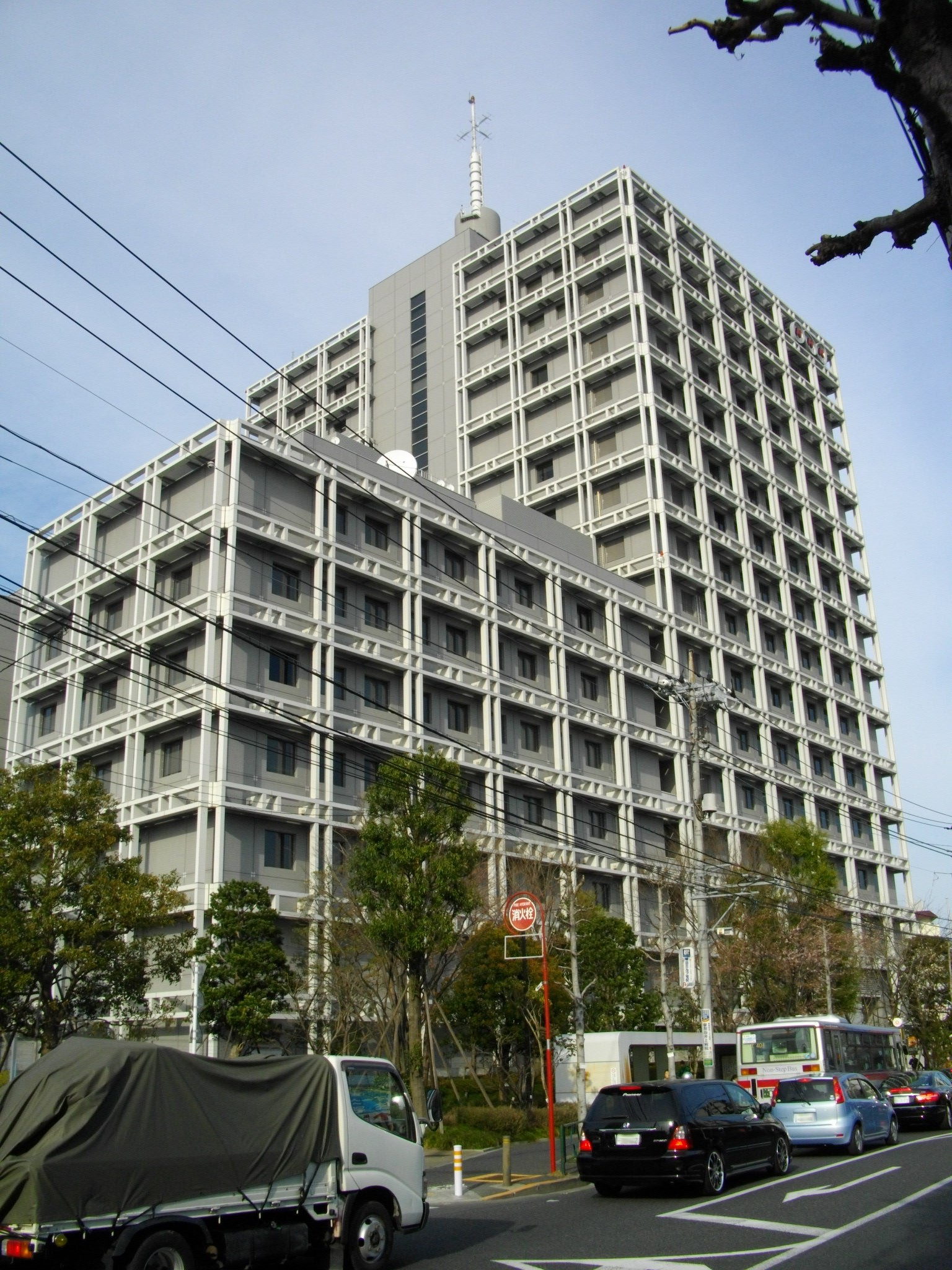
NHK STRL

NHK Science & Technology Research Laboratories (STRL, Japanese: NHK放送技術研究所, romanized: NHK Hōsō Gijutsu Kenkyūjo), headquartered in Setagaya, Tokyo, Japan, is responsible for technical research at NHK, Japan's public broadcaster.

Work done by the STRL includes research on direct-broadcast satellite (BS), Integrated Services Digital Broadcasting, high-definition television, and ultra-high-definition television.

On May 9, 2013, NHK and Mitsubishi Electric announced that they had jointly developed the first High Efficiency Video Coding (HEVC) encoder for 8K Ultra HD TV, which is also called Super Hi-Vision (SHV). The HEVC encoder supports the Main 10 profile at Level 6.1 allowing it to encode 10-bit video with a resolution of 7680 × 4320 at 60 fps. The HEVC encoder has 17 3G-SDI inputs and uses 17 boards for parallel processing with each board encoding a row of 7680 × 256 pixels to allow for real time video encoding. The HEVC encoder was shown at the NHK Science & Technology Research Laboratories Open House 2013 that took place from May 30 to June 2.

== See also ==
- NHK
- NHK Twinscam
- Ultra-high-definition television (UHDTV)
- High Efficiency Video Coding (HEVC) – Video codec that supports resolutions up to 8K UHDTV (7680 × 4320)
