= SES Platform Services =

European telecommunications company

SES Platform Services GmbH
- Type: Privately owned subsidiary
- Industry: Telecommunications; Digital media services to the broadcast industry
- Founded: 2004
- Headquarters: Unterföhring, Germany
- Key people: Wilfried Urner (CEO)
- Products: Satellite and broadcasting services
- Website: ses-ps.com

SES Platform Services GmbH (previously ASTRA Platform Services GmbH, later MX1, now part of SES Video) was a subsidiary company of SES (owner and operator of the Astra satellites) based in Betzdorf, Luxembourg. From its headquarters in Unterföhring near Munich, Germany, SES Platform Services operated a broadcasting centre, providing a wide range of services, including content management, playout, encryption, multiplexing, satellite uplinks and other digital TV media broadcast services for the broadcast industry.

Following completion of the acquisition by SES Platform Services of global digital media services provider RR Media in July 2016, the name of the merged company was changed to MX1 In September 2019, MX1 was merged into the SES Video division and the MX1 brand dropped.

Before changing to MX1, SES Platform Services distributed more than 300 digital TV channels (including HD) and radio stations, interactive services and data services. In August 2013, SES Platform Services won an international tender by Turner Broadcasting System, starting November 2013, to provide playout for the broadcast channels, Boomerang, Cartoon Network, glitz*, RT, TNT Film and TNT Serie (in both SD and HD) for the German-speaking market, digitization of existing Turner content, and playout for Turner on-demand and catch-up services in Germany, Austria, Switzerland the Benelux region.

== History ==
Originally called DPC (Digital Playout Centre GmbH), SES Platform Services was founded in 1996 by KirchMedia AG, a German media company. The German Pay TV provider, Premiere (now Sky Deutschland) was part of the Kirch Group and DPC provided (and, as SES Platform Services, continues to provide) Premiere/Sky Deutschland, as well as other private and public German broadcasters, playout, multiplexing, encrypted satellite uplinks and other media broadcast services. In June 2004, SES announced that it had bought the controlling interest in DPC from Premiere with the intention of launching an "open" pay-TV platform for Germany using Premiere-compatible digital set top boxes.

The pre-2012 logo for the company before the change of name to SES Platform Services

In December 2004, a requirement for regulatory approval from the German Federal Cartels Office (Bundeskartellamt) meant that the deal was changed to 100% of DPC, to give SES sole ownership. DPC was later renamed to ASTRA Platform Services GmbH (APS), and in April 2012 to SES Platform Services.

In February 2016, it was announced that SES Platform Services had agreed, subject to regulatory approvals, to purchase RR Media, a global digital media services provider to the broadcast and media industries, based in Israel.

== Services ==
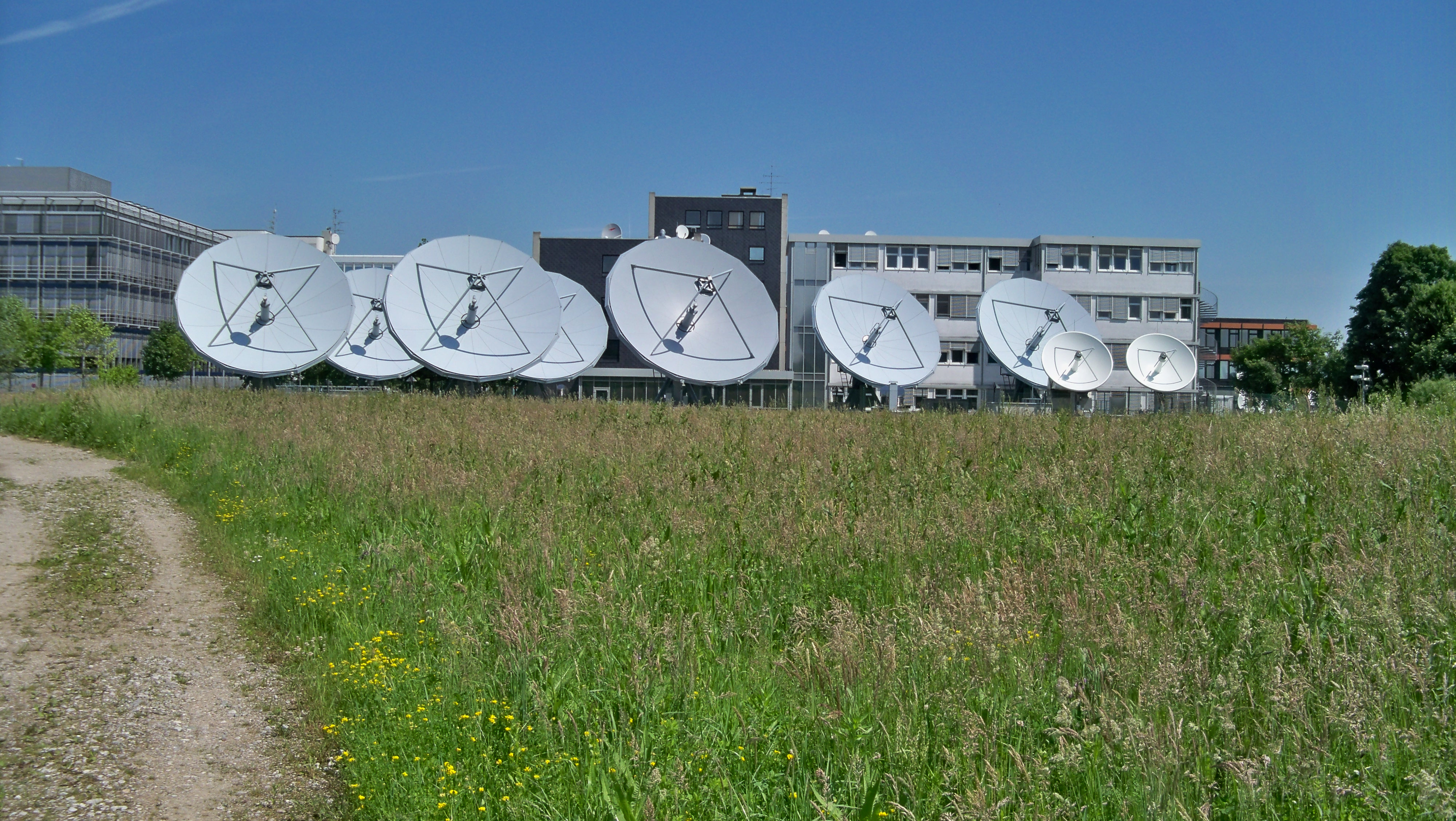
SES Platform Services uplink dishes in Unterföhring

The main services provided to broadcasters by SES Platform Services are Content Management, Playout, Encryption, Distribution and Interactive services. Customers include Sky Deutschland and ProSiebenSat.1 in Germany, Top TV in South Africa, channels such as Home Shopping Europe, DSF, Tele 5, 9Live, and DMAX, and most German HDTV channels, including those from Discovery, Tectime TV and Anixe.

SES Platform Services' content management encompasses digitization of tape-based content, format conversion of video files, quality control, tape storage (now being superseded by digital storage), and a growing digital archive service with integrated digital asset management systems. SES Platform Services uses the DIVArchive digital archiving system from Front Porch Digital with (as of mid 2009), over 1 PB capacity storing tens of thousands of hours of content. New material is added at the rate of about 1000–2000 hours per month. Although SES Platform Services still provides videotape storage, this has reduced by more than half since digital archiving was introduced.

SES Platform Services undertakes the preparation and playout of content from tape or digital files according to the customer's supplied schedule. SES Platform Services provides customers with visual quality control, the incorporation of on-screen branding and graphics (in 2D or 3D), EPG data and expandable services that range from automatic small channel start-up systems to high-end systems with full-time monitoring and support.

Where needed, interactive services can also be provided to broadcasters, including HbbTV (Hybrid Broadcast Broadband TV). SES Platform Services also designs and develops broadcasters’ web pages, and has developed the Blucom interactive TV-service that combines broadcasting and mobile technologies to offer services such as programme announcements, weather, lottery and sports results, and further programme information. Blucom enables interaction such as voting, downloads, chats, and advertising. It also gives mobile phones the ability to stream live TV broadcasts. Blucom synchronizes TV content with the additional information in real-time. Content is sent to a set-top box via satellite, then to a mobile phone via Bluetooth, or directly to the mobile phone via UMTS/GPRS. The return channel operates from the viewer’s mobile via SMS or UMTS/GPRS.

For pay-TV broadcasts, SES Platform Services provides channel encryption for subscription and pay-per-view protection with Conax, Cryptoworks, Irdeto, Nagravision, and NDS conditional access systems using DVB simulcrypt operation for broadcasts using multiple conditional access systems in parallel, this being a common practice in "free-to-air"(FTA) satellite TV broadcast markets such as Germany. SES Platform Services also provides Microsoft or Flash digital rights management for Internet streamed channels.

Although the majority of SES Platform Services broadcasting traffic is digital television channels in SD or HD uplinked to the Astra satellites, SES Platform Services can also distribute programming to mobiles as on-demand content, and as live or on-demand video over the Internet using Windows Media Player, QuickTime or Flash.

In April 2011, SES Platform Services opened a new playout centre at its headquarters in Unterföhring to handle expansion of the company, and its client list. The new network operations centre is in a purpose-built new building with the latest technologies including air conditioning based on groundwater cooling, fully redundant power distribution system, and LED screens and LED room lighting in the master control room to minimise heat generation. The old premises are being retained as back-up facilities and the new centre is expected to cope with growth for the next five years.

In June 2015 SES Platform Services launched its Fluid Hub managed cloud service for management, playout and distribution of video content for studios, content creators, broadcasting companies, telcos/platforms and other customers. By October 20, the service had 10 customers including Fox International Channels Germany and Turner.

== See also ==
- MX1
- Digital television in Germany
- Satellite television
- SES
- Astra
