= International Broadcasting Convention =

Trade show for the TV industry

IBC (formerly International Broadcasting Convention)
- Status: Active
- Venue: RAI Amsterdam Convention Centre
- Location: Amsterdam
- Country: Netherlands
- Inaugurated: 1967; 59 years ago
- Attendance: 45,000+
- Website: show.ibc.org

International Broadcasting Convention, more commonly known by its initials IBC, is an annual trade show, held in September at the RAI Exhibition and Convention Centre in Amsterdam, the Netherlands. IBC's tagline is "By the industry. For the industry." and it is aimed at broadcasters, content creators/providers, equipment manufacturers, professional and technical associations, and other participants in the broadcasting, entertainment and technology industry. In addition to being a trade show showcasing a hundred of exhibitors there is an IBC conference, panel discussions, demos, technical paper presentations and speaker sessions to attend. IBC is an independent body, owned by six partner bodies: IABM, IEEE, IET, RTS, SCTE and SMPTE, with a full-time professional staff.

The 2019 show marked the last in-person show for 2 years due to the COVID-19 outbreak, although a digital show was held in 2021. IBC returned on 9–12 September 2022 with 37,071 visitors from over 170 countries gathering in Amsterdam to reconnect face-to-face again.

== Exhibitors and innovations ==
The International Broadcasting Convention regularly hosts major players in the fields of media production, post-production, and broadcasting technology.

During the 2025 edition held in Amsterdam (12–15 September 2025), several companies presented innovations related to artificial intelligence, media management, and cloud workflows. Among the notable exhibitors were:

- Adobe – showcased its latest version of Premiere Pro timed for IBC 2025.
- Blackmagic Design – announced support for Apple ProRes RAW and new hardware at IBC 2025.
- Avid Technology – returned as a leading exhibitor to drive collaborative editing and media workflows.
- CYME – the French software publisher behind Peakto, presented its media-management solution at IBC 2025, emphasising AI-driven workflows for photo and video creators.

These exhibitors reflected the event's focus on intelligent media management, privacy-first AI workflows, and hybrid cloud/on-premise infrastructures.

== Dates ==
=== 2009 ===
- Conference: 10–14 September 2009
- Exhibition: 11–15 September 2009

=== 2010 ===
- Conference: 9–14 September 2010
- Exhibition: 10–14 September 2010

=== 2011 ===
- Conference: 8–13 September 2011
- Exhibition: 9–13 September 2011

=== 2012 ===
- Conference: 6–11 September 2012
- Exhibition: 7–11 September 2012

=== 2013 ===
- Conference: 12–17 September 2013
- Exhibition: 13–17 September 2013

=== 2014 ===
- Conference: 11–15 September 2014
- Exhibition: 12–16 September 2014

=== 2015 ===
- Conference: 10–14 September 2015
- Exhibition: 11–15 September 2015

=== 2016 ===
- Conference: 8–12 September 2016
- Exhibition: 9–13 September 2016

=== 2017 ===
- Conference: 13–17 September 2017
- Exhibition: 14–18 September 2017

=== 2018 ===
- Conference: 14–18 September 2018
- Exhibition: 15–19 September 2018

=== 2019 ===
- Conference: 13–17 September 2019
- Exhibition: 13–17 September 2019

=== 2020 ===
The 2020 edition of the show was originally scheduled for 11–15 September 2020, but was cancelled due to the COVID-19 pandemic.

=== 2021 ===
The 2021 edition of the show was originally scheduled for 3–6 December 2021, but was cancelled due to the COVID-19 pandemic and a digital show was held in its place.

=== 2022 ===
- Conference: 9–10 September 2022
- Exhibition: 9–12 September 2022

=== 2023 ===
- Conference: 15–16 September 2023
- Exhibition: 15–18 September 2023

=== 2024 ===
- Conference: 13–15 September 2024
- Exhibition: 13–16 September 2024
