= MX1 Ltd =

Global media services company

MX1
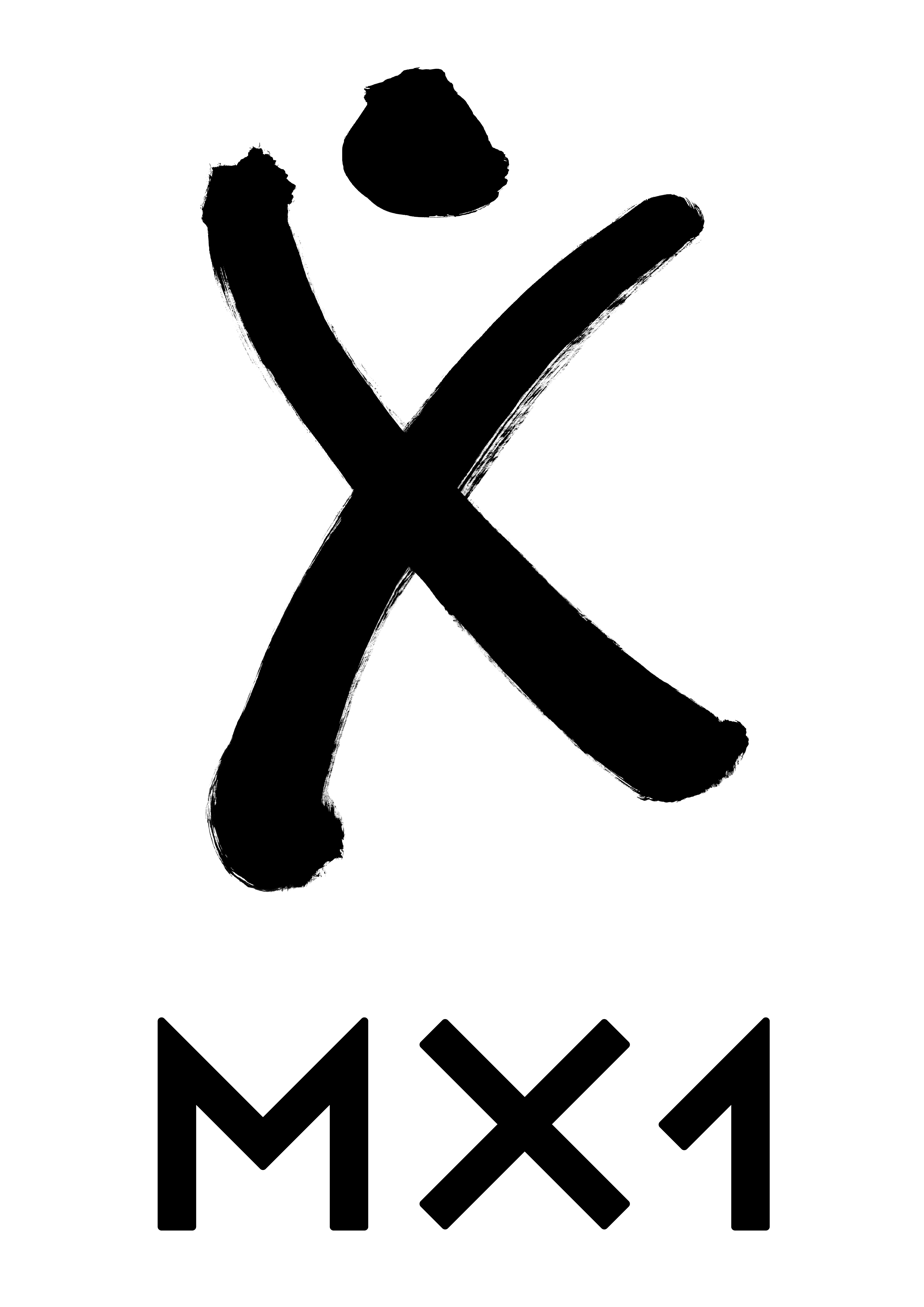
- Type: Wholly owned subsidiary
- Industry: Global media services to the broadcast media and video industries
- Founded: 2016
- Headquarters: Unterföhring (Germany)
- Key people: Wilfried Urner, chief executive officer
- Website: mx1.com

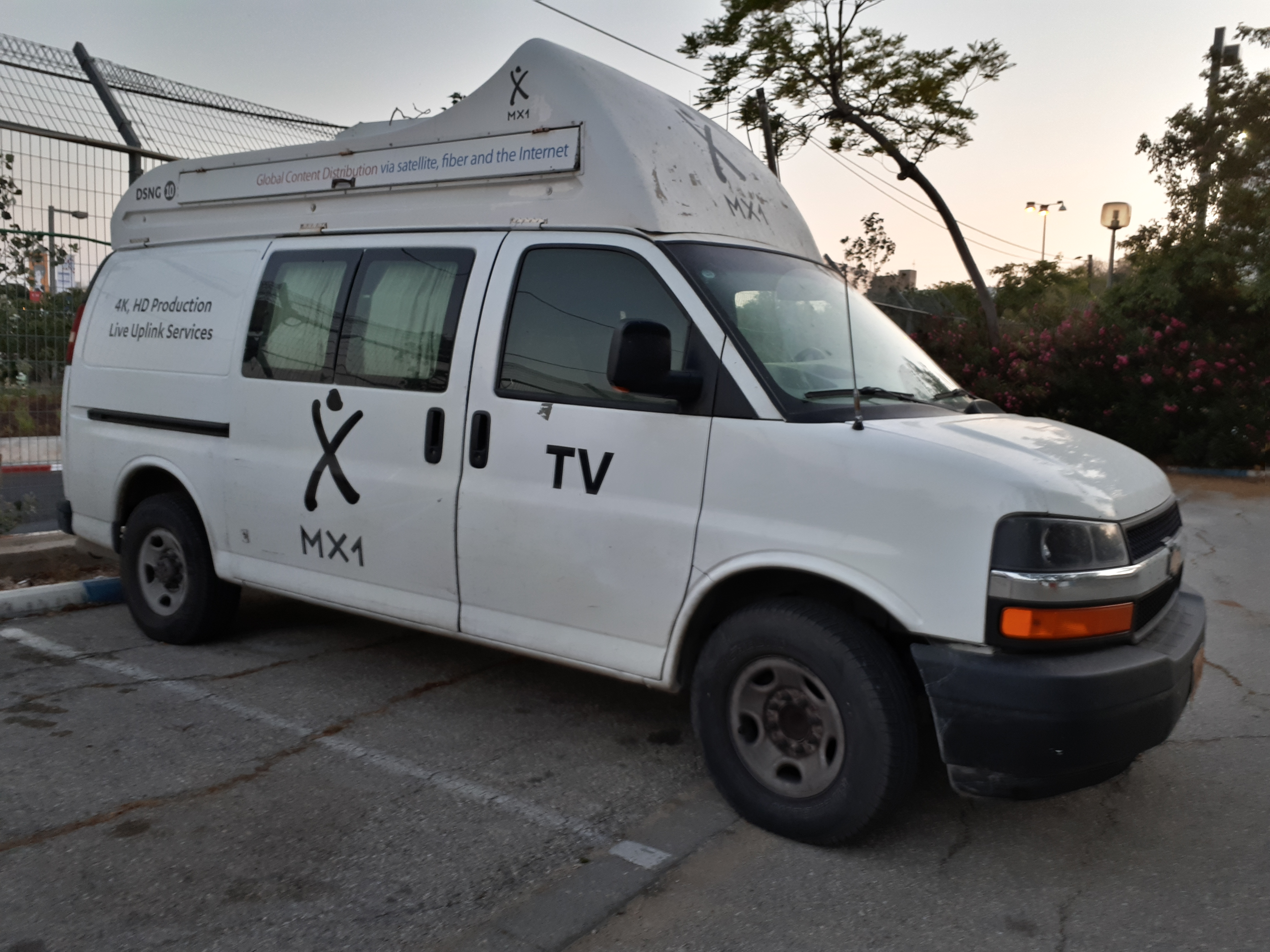
MX1 Broadcasting Van parked outside Israeli Educational Television office in Tel Aviv

MX1 was a global media services provider founded in July 2016 from a merger between digital media services companies, RR Media and SES Platform Services, and a wholly owned subsidiary of global satellite owner and operator, SES.

In September 2019, MX1 was merged into the SES Video division and the MX1 brand dropped. Broadcast and streamed content management, playout, distribution, and monetisation services from both MX1 and SES Video are now provided under the SES name.

Before its merger with SES, MX1 claimed to manage more than 5 million media assets and every day to distribute more than 3,600 TV channels, manage the playout of over 525 channels, distribute content to more than 120 subscription VOD platforms, and deliver over 8,400 hours of online video streaming and more than 620 hours of premium sports and live events.

== Services ==
MX1 video and media services are provided through a single hybrid, cloud and on-premises solution, called MX1 360, which enables video and media solutions including content and metadata management, archiving, localisation solutions, channel playout, VOD, online video (OTT) and content distribution. Services provided by MX1 include:

=== Content aggregation ===
Acquisition of content via satellite, fibre or IP with satellite downlinking services (for encryption, re-encryption and re-muxing into different platforms), fibre reception from any location, and IP reception via the public Internet. Live sports, news and entertainment production (including in-studio, outside broadcasting, and SNG) with mobile live streaming and video contribution.

=== Content management ===
Digital mastering including scanning, conversion, restoration, quality control and localisation/versioning. Content archiving including secure, cloud and on-premises digital storage, and disaster recovery services. Metadata packaging and platform validation to enhance content discovery, searchability and cataloguing. Playout preparation and delivery to any format.

=== Channel origination and playout ===
Managed TV channel origination in SD, HD and UHD including 3D graphics, and video and audio effects, using cloud-based solution accessible from any location, with live content insertion and operation, and 24/7 monitoring.

=== Online video/VOD services ===
Content preparation and management for online video, VOD, live streaming services and Online video platforms using a high capacity content delivery network, including subscriber management, apps, DRM, social media, advertising tools, monetisation tools, metadata management, and analytics.

=== Content delivery ===
Delivery in all video formats over hybrid distribution network of satellite (using over 150 platforms), fibre (60 digital media hubs worldwide) and the Internet with complete downlink/uplink turnaround services and OTT content delivery.

== Locations ==
MX1 has 16 offices worldwide, the most recent opened in March 2017 in Seoul, South Korea, as well as media centres in UK (London), US (Hawley, PA), Israel (Emeq Ha'Ela), Romania (Bucharest) and at the headquarters in Unterföhring near Munich, Germany.

In the early part of 2017, significant upgrades were made to MX1's US media centre in Hawley, Pennsylvania, including expanding its capabilities for US based and global content aggregation, management and delivery to support US broadcasters and content providers.

== History ==
RRsat was founded in Israel by David Rivel, an electronics, computers and communications engineer in 1981 as a communications provider, and in 2014 changed its name to RR Media to reflect its expanding global service offering. In 2015, RR Media acquired Eastern Space Systems (ESS), a Romanian provider of content management and content distribution services and satellite transmission services provider, SatLink Communications.

Digital Playout Centre GmbH (DPC) was founded in 1996 by German media company, Kirch to provide playout, multiplexing, satellite uplinks and other broadcast services to Kirch's Premiere pay-TV platform (now Sky Deutschland) and other private and public German broadcasters. In 2005, SES Astra (a subsidiary of SES Global, now SES) bought 100% of DPC from Premiere and the company renamed ASTRA Platform Services GmbH (APS). In 2012, to reflect the company's expanding worldwide reach, the name was changed to SES Platform Services.

In February 2016, it was announced that SES Platform Services had agreed, subject to regulatory approvals, to purchase RR Media. The acquisition was completed in July 2016, with the merged company renamed MX1 and headed by Avi Cohen, the former CEO of RR Media. In October 2017, Cohen was replaced as CEO by Wilfred Urner, the former CEO of SES Platform Services, CEO of SES subsidiary, HD+ and Head of Media Platforms and Product Development, SES Video.

== See also ==
- SES
- Astra
- SES Platform Services
- RR Media
