= List of Animal Planet original programming =

The following is a list of television programs currently or formerly broadcast by Animal Planet.

== Current programming ==
- Puppy Bowl (2005–present)

== Former programming ==
=== A ===
- The A-List (2007)
- Absolutely Animals (1995–98)
- Acorn the Nature Nut (1994)
- Addicts & Animals (2012)
- Adoption Tales (2003)
- The Adventures of Skippy (1997)
- Africa River Wild (2016)
- After the Attack (2008)
- Alaska: Battle on the Bay (2015)
- Alaska Gold Diggers (2013)
- Alaska Moose Men
- The All New Planet's Funniest Animals (2006)
- Amanda to the Rescue (2018)
- Amazing Animal Videos (2001–02)
- Amazing Tails (1996)
- America's Cutest (2013)
- American River Renegades (2014)
- American Stuffers (2012)
- Animal Airport (2012)
- Animal Armageddon (2009)
- Animal Battlegrounds (2006)
- Animal Camera (2004)
- Animal Cops: Detroit (2003–10)
- Animal Cops: Houston (2003–15)
- Animal Cops: Miami (2010–11)
- Animal Cops: Philadelphia (2008–09)
- Animal Cops: Phoenix (2007–09)
- Animal Cops: San Francisco (2005–06)
- Animal Cops: South Africa (2007–08)
- Animal Crackers (2008)
- Animal Cribs (2017)
- Animal Face-Off (2004)
- Animal House (2018)
- Animal Icons (2004–05)
- Animal Kidding (2003)
- Animal Legends (2000)
- Animal Life: Young and Wild (2002)
- Animal Miracles (2001–03)
- Animal Nation with Anthony Anderson (2017)
- Animal Planet City (2006)
- Animal Planet Report (2005–06)
- Animal Planet Rescue (1999)
- Animal Planet Zooventure (1997–2000)
- Animal Planet's Most Outrageous (2009)
- Animal Precinct (2001–08)
- Animal X (1997–2002)
- The Animals' Guide to Survival (2009)
- The Aquanauts (1999)
- The Aquarium (2019-20)
- Arctic (2011)
- Austin Stevens: Snakemaster (2004–09)

=== B ===
- Baby Panda's First Year (2007)
- Backyard Habitat (2005–06)
- Bad Dog! (2010–14)
- Battleground: Rhino Wars (2013)
- Beasts of the Bible (2010)
- Beaver Brothers (2014)
- Belles et Rebelles (2010-2012)
- Best in Town (2006)
- Beverly Hills Groomer (2009)
- Beverly Hills Vet (2003)
- Beware of Dog (2002)
- Big Bear Week (2006)
- Big Cat Diary (1996–2008)
- Big Cat Tales (2018–20)
- Big, Small & Deadly (2019)
- Biggest and Baddest 3 (2020)
- Blonde vs Bear (2011)
- Blood Dolphins (2010)
- Blood Ivory (2017)
- Born Mucky: Life on the Farm (2020)
- Breed All About It (1998–2001)
- Breeder of the Pack (2008)
- Brotherhood of Lions (2024)
- Buck Staghorn's Animal Bites (1996)
- Buggin' with Ruud (2005–06)

=== C ===
- Call of the Wild (2000)
- Call of the Wildman (2011–14)
- Canopy Kings (2017)
- The Cannibal in the Jungle (2015)
- Cat Vs. Dog (2017)
- Catfishin' Kings (2013)
- Cats 101 (2008–12)
- Caught in the Moment (2006)
- Celebrity Animal Encounters (2019)
- Cell Dogs (2004)
- Champions of the Wild (1998–2002)
- Chasing Nature (2005)
- The Cheetah Diaries (2011)
- Clinically Wild: Alaska (2008)
- Comedians Unleashed (2002)
- Confessions: Animal Hoarding (2010–12)
- Corwin's Quest (2005–06)
- Coyote Peterson: Brave the Wild (2020–22)
- Creature Comforts (2008)
- Crikey! It's the Irwins (2018–22)
- Croc Files (1999–2001)
- The Crocodile Hunter (1996–2007)
- The Crocodile Hunter Diaries (2002–04)

=== D ===
- Dark Days in Monkey City (2009)
- Deadliest Catch: Dungeon Cove (2016)
- Deadly 60 (2009)
- Demon Exorcist (2011)
- Dinosaur Planet (2003)
- Divine Canine (2007)
- Dodo Heroes (2018)
- Dr. Dee: Alaska Vet (2015–16)
- Dr. Jeff: Rocky Mountain Vet (2015-22)
- Dr. Keri: Prairie Vet (2017)
- Dog Castle (2008)
- Dog Detectives (2025)
- Dogs 101 (2008–11)
- Dog Days (2002)
- Dogs vs. Cats (2010)
- Dolphin Days (2009)
- Dragons Alive (2004)

=== E ===
- Eaten Alive (2009)
- Eating the Enemy (2012)
- Echo and the Elephants of Amboseli (2009)
- Elephant Diaries (2005)
- Ella and Me (2006)
- Emergency Vets (1998–2008)
- Escape to Chimp Eden (2008–09)
- Eukanuba Tournament of Champions (2001)
- Evan Goes Wild (2019)
- Expedition Mungo (2017)
- Extinct or Alive (2018)
- Extraordinary Animals (2008-10)
- Extreme Contact (2000)
- E-Vet Interns (2007–09)

=== F ===
- Fatal Attractions (2010–13)
- Feeding Frenzy (2008)
- Finding Bigfoot (2011–18)
- Fish or Die (2019)
- Flipper (1964)
- Flipping Ships (2015)
- Fooled By Nature (2007)
- Freak Encounters (2010)
- Furever Home Family (2020)
- The Future Is Wild (2002)

=== G ===
- Gangland Killers (2014)
- Gator Boys (2012–15)
- Gentle Ben (2002)
- Get Out There! (2005)
- Ghostland, Tennessee (2013)
- Giant Monsters (2003)
- Gibbons: Back in the Swing (2008)
- Goin' Pearl Crazy (2013)
- Going Ape (2006)
- Good Dog U (1999)
- Gorilla School (2010-2011)
- Great Barrier Reef (2012)
- Great Ocean Adventures (2005)
- The Great Rift: Africa's Wild Heart (2010)
- Great Rivers of Africa (1996)
- Great Savannah Race (2005–06)
- Grizzly Man (2005)
- The Grizzly Man Diaries (2008)
- Groomer Has It (2008–09)
- Growing Up (2003-07)
- Growing Up Grizzly (2001)
- Growing Up Wild (2001)
- The Guardians (2017)

=== H ===
- Hanging with the Hendersons (2019–20)
- The Haunted (2009–11)
- Hero Animals (2009)
- Hillbilly Handfishin' (2011–12)
- Hollywood Safari (1998)
- Horse Power: Road to the Maclay (2006)
- Horse Tales (1998)
- Housecat Housecall (2008–10)
- How Do Animals Do That? (2019–20)
- Human Planet (2011)
- Human Prey (2009)

=== I ===
- I Shouldn't Be Alive (2010–13)
- I Was Prey (2017)
- I'm Alive (2009–11)
- I, Predator (2011)
- Ice Cold Gold (2013–15)
- Ice Lake Rebels (2014–16)
- In Care of Nature (1994)
- In Search of Monsters (2019)
- Infested! (2011–12)
- Insane Pools: Off the Deep End (2015–18)
- I Was Bitten (2008)
- Into Alaska (2018)
- Into the Lion's Den (2004)
- Into the Pride (2009)
- It's Me or the Dog (2007–10)
- Ivory Wars (2013-14)

=== J ===
- The Jeff Corwin Experience (2000–03)
- Jeremy Wade's Dark Waters (2019)
- Jeremy Wade's Mighty Rivers (2018)
- Jessica the Hippo (2007)
- Jim Henson's Animal Show (1994)
- Jockeys (2009)
- Judge Wapner's Animal Court (1998–2000)

=== K ===
- K9 Cops (2008–09)
- K-9 to 5 (1999–2001)
- K9 Bootcamp (2003)
- K9 Karma (2005)
- Killer Elephants (2001)
- Killer Jellyfish (2005)
- Killer Outbreaks (2011)
- Killer Squid (2004)
- Killing for a Living (2008)
- King of the Jungle (2003–04)

=== L ===
- Lassie (1997)
- The Last Alaskans (2015)
- Last American Cowboy (2010)
- Last Chance Highway (2010)
- The Last Dragon (2004)
- Law on the Border (2012)
- Lemur Street (2008)
- Life at Vet U (2016)
- Life Force (2010-14)
- Life in Cold Blood (2008)
- Life in the Underground (2005)
- A Lion Called Christian (2009)
- The Lion Man: African Safari (2014)
- Little Giants (2019)
- The Little Zoo That Could (2006–07)
- Living on the Edge (2013)
- Living with the Wolfman (2008)
- Living with Tigers (2003)
- Lone Star Law (2016-21)
- Lost Tapes (2008–10)
- Lost Treasure Hunters (2014)
- Louisiana Law (2021-23)

=== M ===
- Madagascar (2011)
- Madison's Adventures - Growing up Wild (1993)
- Madman of the Sea (2010)
- The Magic of the Big Blue (2013)
- Maneaters (2008)
- Massive Nature (2004)
- Max's Big Tracks (2008)
- Meerkat Manor (2005–08)
- Meet the Penguins (2017)
- Meet the Preppers: My Pink Pistol (2012)
- Meet the Sloths (2013)
- Mega Zoo (2020)
- Mermaids: The Body Found (2012)
- Miami Animal Police (2004)
- Money Barn (2013)
- Monkey Business (1998)
- Monkey Life (2007–18)
- Monster Croc Invasion (2015)
- Monsters Inside Me (2009–17)
- Monsters We Met (2004)
- The Most Extreme (2002–07)
- Ms. Adventure (2007)
- Mud Lovin' Rednecks (2011)
- Must Love Cats (2011–12)
- Mutant Planet (2010-14)
- My Big Fat Pet Makeover (2017)
- My Cat from Hell (2011–20)
- My Extreme Animal Phobia (2011)
- My New Wild Life (2008)
- My Pack Life (2022-23)
- My Pet's Gone Viral (2013)
- My Tiny Terror (2014)
- Mysterious Creatures with Forrest Galante (2021)
- Mystery of the Lost Islands (2014)

=== N ===
- Nature's Great Events (2009)
- Nature's Greatest Secret: The Coral Triangle (2014-15)
- Nature's Strangest Mysteries: Solved (2019)
- Nature's Vampires (2004)
- Ned Bruha: Skunk Whisperer (2011)
- New Breed Vets (2005)
- Night (2009)
- 9-1-1 Encounters (2016)
- No Limits (2014)
- North Woods Law (2012-21)
- Northwest Law (2015-16)

=== O ===
- O'Shea's Big Adventure (1998)
- Ocean Warriors (2016)
- Ocean's Deadliest (2007)
- Off the Hook: Extreme Catches (2012–13)
- Once Upon a Hamster (1995)
- 100 Miles from Nowhere (2015)
- Operation Wild (2010)
- Orangutan Island (2007–09)
- Otter Dynasty (2023)

=== P ===
- The Pack (2010)
- Panda Adventure with Nigel Marven (2010)
- Penguin Safari with Nigel Marven (2007)
- Pet Connection (1993)
- Pet Passport (2008)
- Pet Project (1996-2000)
- The Pet Psychic (2002–03)
- The Pet Shop (1997-98)
- Pet Star (2002–05)
- Pet Trends with Maggie Gallant (2006)
- Petfinder (2008)
- Pets 101 (2010–11)
- Pets & Pickers (2022-24)
- Petsburgh USA (1998–99)
- Pit Boss (2010–13)
- Pit Bulls & Parolees (2009–22)
- Pit Bulls & Parolees: Found a Forever Home (2019)
- Pit Bulls & Parolees: Harrowing Rescues (2018)
- Pit Bulls & Parolees: Waiting for a Forever Home (2019)
- Planet's Best (2003)
- Planet's Best with Terri and Bindi (2007)
- Planet Earth (2006)
- The Planet's Funniest Animals (1999–2008)
- Planet in Peril (2007)
- The Polar Bear Family & Me (2013)
- The Pool Master (2014)
- Predator Bay (2003)
- Predator's Prey (2005)
- Prehistoric Park (2006)
- Profiles of Nature
- Project Grizzly (2016)
- Puppies v Babies (2011)
- Puppy Bowl Presents: 20 Years of Puppies (2020)
- Puppy Games (2008)

=== R ===
- Rabid Beasts (2016)
- Raised Human (2014)
- Raised Wild (2012)
- Rat Buster (2011)
- Rattlesnake Republic (2012–14)
- Raw Nature (2008)
- The Real Lion Queen (2013)
- The Real Lost World (2006)
- Redwood Kings (2013)
- Restoration Wild (2015)
- The Retrievers (2001)
- River Monsters (2009–17)
- Road to Puppy Bowl (2020)
- Rocky Mountain Bounty Hunters (2014)
- Rocky Mountain Gators
- Rugged Justice (2015)

=== S ===
- Safari Sisters (2009)
- Saved by the Barn (2020)
- Saving Africa's Giants with Yao Ming (2014)
- Saving Britain's Wildlife (2025)
- Saving Grace (2007)
- Scaled (2018)
- Sea Monsters (2003)
- The Secret Life of Elephants (2009)
- The Secret Life of the Zoo (2017–20)
- Shark Academy (2022)
- Shark Gordon (2000-02)
- Showdog Moms & Dads (2005)
- Snake Boss (2015–16)
- The Snake Buster (2003)
- Snake Man of Appalachia (2012)
- SnakesKin (2010)
- Snow Leopards of Leafy London (2013)
- South Pacific (2009)
- Spring Watch USA (2007)
- A Stable Life (2009)
- Steve Irwin's Ghosts of War (2002)
- Steve Irwin's Great Escapes (2006)
- Stranger Among Bears (2009)
- Sunrise Earth (2004)
- SuperFetch (2009)
- The Supervet (2014)
- Surviving Joe Exotic (2020)
- Swamp'd! (2012–13)
- Swamp Wars (2011–13)
- Swarm Chasers (2011)
- Swamp'd (2012)

=== T ===
- Taking On Tyson (2011)
- Tanked (2011–18)
- Tanked Jr. (2018)
- Tattooed in Detroit (2011)
- Ten Deadliest Snakes with Nigel Marvin (2014)
- 10 Years of Monkey Business (2007)
- Texas Rodeo Tykes (2010)
- That's My Baby (2001–03)
- Thoroughbred (2001)
- Tiger: Spy in the Jungle (2008)
- The Tiger Next Door (2009)
- Too Cute (2011–17)
- Top Hooker (2013)
- Total Fear (2003)
- Total Zoo (2001)
- The Trapper and the Amazon (2010)
- Treehouse Masters (2013–18)
- Treehouse Masters International (2014)
- Treehouse Masters: Lost in the Forest (2015)
- Treetop Cat Rescue (2015)
- Trek: Spy on the Wildebeest (2007)
- Twisted Tales (1998-2001)

=== U ===
- Ultimate Dog Championships (2006)
- Ultimate Treehouses (2013)
- Ultimate Zoo (2005)
- Underdog to Wonderdog (2009)
- Unearthed (2006)
- Untamed China with Nigel Marven (2011)
- Untamed & Uncut (2008–10)
- Up Close and Dangerous (2006)
- Uptown Otters (2022)

=== V ===
- Venom 911 (2004)
- Venom ER (2004)
- Venom Hunter with Donald Schultz (2013)
- The Vet Life (2016–20)
- The Vet Life: Extreme Animal Encounters (2019-20)
- Vet School Confidential (2001)
- Viking Wilderness (2011)

=== W ===
- Walking with Elephants (2020)
- Wardens of the North (2023–26)
- Weird, True & Freaky (2009–18)
- Whale Wars (2008–15)
- Whale Wars: Viking Shores (2012)
- Who Gets the Dog? (2005)
- Whoa! Sunday with Mo Rocca (2005)
- Wild 100: Top 10 (2007)
- Wild About Animals (1995)
- Wild Africa: Rivers of Life (2017)
- Wild Animal Orphans (2012)
- Wild Arabia (2013)
- Wild Assassins (2023)
- Wild Bear Rescue (2017-19)
- Wild Deep (2013)
- Wild Down Under (2003)
- Wild Kingdom (2002–11)
- Wild on the Set (2000)
- Wild Obsession (2012-13)
- Wild Peru: Andes Battleground (2018)
- Wildlife SOS (1996–2014)
- Wild Recon (2010)
- Wild Rescues (1998-2004)
- Wild Russia (2009)
- Wild South America (2000)
- Wild Times (2018-19)
- Wildest Africa (2010-11)
- Wildest India (2012)
- Wildest Islands (2012-15)
- Wildest Latin America (2012)
- Wildest Arctic (2012)
- Wildest Islands (2012-13)
- Wildest Indochina (2014)
- Wildest Middle East (2015)
- Wildest Islands of Indonesia (2016)
- Wildlife Emergency (1998)
- Wildlife Journal (2004-07)
- Wildlife Journeys (1992)
- Wildlife on One (1977)
- Wild West Alaska (2013–16)
- Walking with Elephants (2020)
- Wolves and Warriors (2018)
- Work on the Wild Side (2020-26)
- World's Deadliest Towns (2011)
- World's Ugliest Dog Contest|World Uglist Dog Competition (2006)

=== Y ===
- Yankee Jungle (2014)
- A Year in Lions (2011)
- Yellowstone (2009)
- Yellowstone Journals (2019)
- Yellowstone Wardens (2023-25)
- You Lie Like a Dog (2000)
- Your Worst Animal Nightmares (2009)

=== Z ===
- Zig & Zag: Alpha Dog Challenge (1999)
- Zoltan the Wolfman (2022)
- The Zoo (2017–21)
- The Zoo: San Diego (2019–21)
- The Zoo: San Diego - A Look Inside (2019)
