= University of Sydney School of Veterinary Science =

Australian public university constituent body

Sydney School of Veterinary Science
- Type: Public
- Established: 1910
- Affiliations: University of Sydney
- Dean: Jacqueline Norris
- Administrative staff: 98 (2010)
- Students: 760 (2010)
- Undergraduates: Bachelor of Veterinary Science (BVSc) (until 2017) Bachelor of Veterinary Biology (BVetBiol) Bachelor of Animal and Veterinary Bioscience (BAnVetBioSc)
- Postgraduates: Doctor of Veterinary Medicine (DVM)
- Location: Camperdown, New South Wales, Australia; Camden, New South Wales, Australia
- Campus: Urban, Parks. Farm
- Website: sydney.edu.au/vetscience

The Sydney School of Veterinary Science is a constituent body of the University of Sydney, Australia. Initially established on 22 March 1910, it is the second oldest established veterinary school in Australia, the longest running veterinary school in Australia and one of two universities offering veterinary degrees in New South Wales. The faculty offers a joint Bachelor of Veterinary Biology/Doctor of Veterinary Medicine (BVetBiol/DVM), having retired the former Bachelor of Veterinary Science (BVSc), and the Bachelor of Animal and Veterinary Bioscience (BAnVetBioSc). The Faculty is established across both Camperdown and Camden campuses. The faculty is usually associated with the Roundhouse or Centaur as a logo and celebrated its centenary in 2010. The Faculty will be incorporated into the Faculty of Science in 2017.

== History ==
The Faculty of Veterinary Science officially opened in 1910 with a student enrolment of 16 students and James Douglas Stewart appointed as Director. Without proper facilities, teaching was done in the then Fisher Library of the Main Quadrangle but relocated to the J.D. Stewart Building in 1913 after its completion.

In 1920, the Veterinary School obtained full faculty status with Professor J.D. Stewart as Dean. Under Stewart, student enrolments gradually increased from 25 in 1928 to over 100 in 1935. In 1930 and during WWII, Sydney University became solely responsible for veterinary education in Australia after temporary closures of both Melbourne University and Queensland University’s veterinary schools respectively.

In 1954, the acquisition of land by the university in Camden paved way for large animal teaching and subsequently the erection of the Evelyn Williams Building and R.M.C. Gunn Building in the Camperdown precinct. More recently new facilities include the Veterinary Science Conference Centre in 1998, the Valentine Charlton Cat Centre and the Canine Teaching Hospital.

In 2005, the faculty introduced the Bachelor of Animal and Veterinary Bioscience and in 2009, Rossane Taylor became the first female Dean of the faculty.

In 2014, the Faculty made the transition from an undergraduate to post-graduate veterinary degree by replacing the long-standing Bachelor of Veterinary Science (BVSc) with the joint Bachelor of Veterinary Biology (BVetBiol) and Doctor of Veterinary Medicine (DVM). Intake of students for the Bachelor of Veterinary Biology commenced in 2014 and Doctor of Veterinary Medicine in 2015. The last intake of students for the Bachelor of Veterinary Science occurred in 2013 and will graduate in 2017.

== Degrees ==
=== Undergraduate ===
==== Bachelor of Veterinary Biology/Doctor of Veterinary Medicine (BVetBiol/DVM) ====
The Faculty of Veterinary Science introduced the joint Bachelor of Veterinary Biology (BVetBiol) and Doctor of Veterinary Medicine (DVM) in 2014, replacing the Bachelor of Veterinary Science (BVSc). The joint degree is composed of two components spanning over six years - an undergraduate animal science degree that runs for the first two years (BVetBiol) and postgraduate veterinary science degree running for the remaining four years (DVM). Undergraduate students that successfully complete the academic requirements for the first two years of the BVetBiol are accepted into the first year of the DVM, whereas students that are unable to meet the academic requirements of progressing into the third year of the programme (first year DVM) can transfer into third year Bachelor of Animal and Veterinary Bioscience (BAnVetBioSc) or complete a Bachelor of Science (BSci). Postgraduate students may also transfer into the DVM without attaining a BVetBiol by meeting academic requirements and proving commitment to the veterinary field.

==== Bachelor of Animal and Veterinary Bioscience (BAnVetBioSc) ====
The Bachelor of Animal and Veterinary Bioscience was introduced in 2005 and focuses more on the production and research aspects of animals. The degree extends across 4 years (full-time) with a research task based on the final year.

==== Bachelor of Veterinary Science (BVSc) ====
The Bachelor of Veterinary Science was a degree offered since the conception of the faculty until 2014 when the Faculty transitioned the veterinary degree to a post-graduate programme. The last intake of students was in 2014, with the final graduating class of the Bachelor of Veterinary Science being 2017. Students undertook 5 years of full-time study with the first three years at the Camperdown campus, fourth year at the Camden campus, and the final year completing rotational intern positions. The degree is recognised by the Veterinary Surgeons Board in every state of Australia and also recognised internationally by the Royal College of Veterinary Surgeons in the United Kingdom and the accredited by the American Veterinary Medical Association (AVMA) in the United States.

==== Bachelor of Science (Veterinary) (BSc(Vet)) ====
The Bachelor of Science (Veterinary) is a one-year research degree, only available to students who have completed their third or fourth year of the BVSc degree.

== Facilities and Heritage buildings ==
=== Camperdown Campus ===
==== J.D. Stewart Building ====
The J.D. Stewart Building is the first veterinary building built for the university and named after the faculty’s founder and first dean, James Douglas Steward. Completed in 1913, three years after the faculty’s first students; it was granted heritage listing in 1976. Today, it houses the faculty office, Veterinary Society office and anatomy dissection labs.

==== The Roundhouse ====
The Roundhouse is a black wooden, heritage-listed rotunda located on the Vet lawns of the Camperdown campus. It was designed by Professor Lesley Wilkinson in 1920 and completed around 1924. Originally utilised as an equine observation box, the Roundhouse is no longer in use, except for VetSoc's annual Beer, Pies, Bull event. It was refurbished by the university in 2009. It is commonly used as a symbol for the faculty and prominently featured for the faculty’s centenary.

==== Veterinary Science Conference Centre ====
The Veterinary Science Conference Centre (VSCC) is a triple-storey building that mainly houses Webster Lecture Theatre.

==== Sydney University Veterinary Teaching Hospital ====
The Sydney University Veterinary Teaching Hospital is a general practice veterinary clinic consisting of the Valentine Charlton Cat Centre and the Canine Teaching Hospital. The hospital contains CT, MRI, digital radiology and ultrasound imaging and diagnostic equipment as well as 24-hour emergency and intensive care. The facility also caters as a teaching hospital for veterinary students to learn professional aspects of the degree. As of late 2016, management of the teaching hospital will be handed over to VetPartners, a for-profit US based company. On the 1st of July 2023, the University of Sydney took back the management of the Teaching Hospital.

=== Camden Campus ===
The Camden campus is located approximately 65 km away from the Camperdown campus. Located on campus includes teaching space, farms and student accommodation. The campus’ main purpose is to provide large animal handling skills for undergraduate students and research for post-graduates. It is the site where the world’s first robotic rotary dairy was opened. The Camden campus is also the home of third year DVM students, having formerly been the home for fourth year BVSc and AVBS students prior to the inception of the current postgraduate program.

== Student Societies and Publications ==
=== Sydney University Veterinary Society (VetSoc) ===
The Sydney University Veterinary Society, more commonly known as VetSoc by students, is the University of Sydney’s second-oldest student run society on campus and represents students of the Bachelor of Veterinary Science, the Bachelor of Animal and Veterinary Bioscience, the Bachelor of Veterinary Biology and Doctorate of Veterinary Medicine. The society plans social events for faculty students and functions as one of the main links between students, staff, alumni and the profession. They help to produce several publications each year. The annual publication, 'The Centaur', was founded in 1933 and has released an issue each year. In more recent times, the society has produced a quarterly publication as well called 'The Chiron'. In 2010 and 2014, VetSoc was voted as the Best Student Society in the university. The official logo is the Centaur.

=== Camden Farms Student Society (CFSS) ===
The Camden Farms Student Society, more commonly known as Camden Farms by students, is the University of Sydney’s veterinary student-run society on its Camden campus. While is presently represents students of the Bachelor of Veterinary Biology and Doctorate of Veterinary Medicine, it formerly also included those of the Bachelor of Veterinary Science and the Bachelor of Animal and Veterinary Bioscience programs prior to their discontinuation. The society plans social events such as the annual Around the World Keg, Vinnie's Ball, Dean's Dinner, Camden Weekender Day Games and other activities.

=== Animal Welfare Society ===
The Animal Welfare Society is a society that aims to promote and address issues in animal welfare both domestically and internationally. Although head mainly by veterinary faculty students, it is open to all students across the faculties of the university.

== Notable alumni ==
=== Historical ===
- Ian Clunies Ross — first recipient of the Doctorate of Veterinary Science

=== Entertainment ===
- Chris Brown — co-stars on Bondi Vet, and the 7PM Project
- Harry Cooper — co-starred on Harry's Practice
- Katrina Warren — co-starred on Harry's Practice, TV presenter

== See also ==
- List of veterinary medicine schools in Australia
