= Dog Days (disambiguation) =

The term dog days refers to the hottest and most humid time of the year in the Northern Hemisphere.

Dog Days may also refer to:

== Arts, entertainment, and media ==
=== Films ===
- Dog Days (1925 film), an American Our Gang short silent film
- Dog Days (1944 film), a German comedy film directed by Géza von Cziffra
- Dog Days (1970 film), a Swedish dark comedy
- Dog Day (film), a 1984 crime-drama starring Lee Marvin
- Dog Days (2001 film), an Austrian feature film directed by Ulrich Seidl
- Dog Days (2018 film), an American comedy film
- Dog Days (2024 film), a South Korean comedy film
- Dog Days of Summer (film), a 2007 American independent feature film
- Diary of a Wimpy Kid: Dog Days (film), a 2012 film

=== Television ===
- Dog Days (Japanese TV series), released in 2011
- Dog Days (U.S. TV series), a 2002 American series
- "Dog Days" (All Creatures Great and Small), a 1978 episode
- "Dog Days", an episode of the sitcom The King of Queens

=== Video games ===
- DogDay, a 1997 Australian adventure game
- Kane & Lynch 2: Dog Days, a 2010 Danish third-person shooter game

=== Literature ===
- A Dog Day: or the Angel in the House, a 1902 children's book written by Walter Emanuel and illustrated by Cecil Aldin
- Dog Days, a 1998 novel by Daniel Lyons
- Dog Days, a 2006 novel by Ana Marie Cox
- Diary of a Wimpy Kid: Dog Days (novel), a 2009 novel by Jeff Kinney
- Dog Days (graphic novel), a graphic novel by Keum Suk Gendry-Kim

=== Music ===
- Dog Day (band), a Canadian indie rock band
- Dog Days (Atlanta Rhythm Section album), released in 1975
- Dog Days (Blue Mountain album), released in 1995
- Dog Days (EP), released in 2000 by Goatsnake
- "Dog Days" (song), released in 2008 by Florence and the Machine

=== Other arts, entertainment, and media ===
- Dog Days (opera)

== Other uses ==
- Dog day cicada

== See also ==
- Day of the Dogs, a 2005 novel by Andrew Cartmel
