= Lion man =

Lion man, lion-man, or similar may refer to:

- the Lion-man of Hohlenstein-Stadel, a prehistoric sculpture discovered in a German cave in 1939
- Stephan Bibrowski (born 1890), a famous sideshow performer, known as Lionel the Lion-faced Man
- Craig Busch (born 1964), New Zealand big-cat expert
- The Lion Man, a New Zealand television documentary series featuring Busch
- The Lion Man (1936 film), an American film
- The Lion Man (serial), a 1919 American action film serial
- Narasimha, an avatar of the Hindu god Vishnu with a human torso and a lion's head and claws
- Kaiketsu Lion-Maru, a 1972 Japanese tokusatsu production known as Lion-Man outside Japan
- Fuun Lion-Maru, a 1973 Japanese tokusatsu production known as Lion-Man outside Japan
- Cory Marks, country rock musician sometimes known by the nickname "Lion Man"
- Urmahlullu, "lion man" in Akkadian, is a mythical ancient Mesopotamian beast with a lion-centaur appearance.
