= Curiosity killed the cat (disambiguation) =

"Curiosity killed the cat" is an English proverb.

Curiosity Killed the Cat and variants may also refer to:

== Film and television ==
- Curiosity Kills the Cat (film), a Chinese film
- "Curiosity Killed the Cat", a 1994 episode of 2point4 children
- "Curiosity Killed the Cat", a 1992 episode of Secret Service

== Music ==
- Curiosity Killed the Cat, a British band
  - "Curiosity Killed the Cat", a song by the band from the album Keep Your Distance
- Curiosity (Killing the Cat), the twin album of the cassette edition of The Cure's Concert: The Cure Live album
- "Curiosity Killed the Cat", a song by G.G.F.H. from the album Halloween
- "Curiosity (Killed the Cat)", a song by Guardian from the album Miracle Mile
- "Curiosity (Killed the Cat)", a 1975 song by Little River Band from the album Little River Band

== Other ==
- Curiosity Kills the Cat?, a Japan-exclusive adventure video game released in 1998 by ASCII for the PlayStation
