= Sophia Yin =

American veterinarian

Sophia Yin (February 5, 1966 – September 28, 2014, in Davis, California) was a veterinarian, applied ethologist, author and lecturer. She was a pioneer in the use of positive reinforcement for training dogs and was widely recognized as an expert in the training of pets.

== Education and career ==
Yin graduated from University of California, Davis (UC Davis) in 1993 with a Doctor of Veterinary Medicine (DVM). After graduation, she worked in private practice, where she realized that more pets were euthanized due to behavioral problems than medical issues. This inspired Yin to return to university to study ethology, and in 2001, she returned to UC Davis to obtain her Master's in Animal Science under the supervision of Dr. Edward Price, completing her thesis on vocal communication in dogs. After obtaining her master's degree, Yin remained at UC Davis for five years, lecturing and supervising student research projects.

From 2007 to 2008, Yin was president of the American Veterinary Society of Animal Behavior. She also served on the American Association of Feline Practitioners (AAFP) Handling Guidelines Committee. She lectured around the world to veterinarians and animal professionals, teaching seminars and workshops on ethology and low stress handling for dogs and cats.

Her behavior modification programs are based on the science of learning. She focused on the use of desensitization combined with classical and operant conditioning. Her approach stressed the combination of positive reinforcement, negative punishment (reward desired behaviors, remove rewards for unwanted behaviors) as well as the need to observe animals closely and be aware of how the trainer's body language and movement affect the animal's response.

Yin invented Treat & Train, a remote controlled, reward based training system based on positive reinforcement.

== Writing and media ==
Yin's first book was The Small Animal Veterinary Nerdbook, which she initially compiled while an veterinary student. The first edition of the Nerdbook, published in 2000, sold 4,500 copies. After the third edition had been published, it sold more than 40,000 copies.

In 1999, Yin began writing a column for the San Francisco Chronicle, which appeared every two weeks. Yin appeared on the Animal Planet television shows Dogs 101 and Weird, True & Freaky in 2008.

Yin created many YouTube videos to help pet owners with handle their animals' behavioral problems, and to promote stress-free handling techniques to veterinary professionals. She also produced educational booklets and posters to educate veterinary staff, dog trainers, other pet professionals and pet owners on how to interact in positive ways with their dogs and cats. In 2010, Yin was included in Bark Magazine's 100 Best and Brightest in the World of Dogs, which praised her ability to impart knowledge to fellow professionals and members of the public.

Other books authored by Yin include Low Stress Handling, Restraint and Behavior Modification of Dogs & Cats, and How to Behave So Your Dog Behaves and Perfect Puppy in 7 Days. Her DVDs include Creating a Pet-Friendly Hospital, Animal Shelter or Petcare Business; Towel Wrap Techniques for Handling Cats with Skill and Ease; and Creating the Perfect Puppy. Yin also had her own publishing company, Cattle Dog Publishing.

== Death ==
In her last days, Yin confided in close friends and colleagues that she felt overwhelmed by her work and worried that she was not good enough at both maintaining her vision and dealing with the internal management of her business. She died by suicide by hanging herself September 28, 2014, at her Davis home. She was 48.

== Works ==
=== Research ===
- Yin, Sophia (2002). "A new perspective on barking in dogs (Canis familaris)". Journal of Comparative Psychology. 116 (2): 189–193. doi:10.1037/0735-7036.116.2.189. PMID 12083615.
- Yin, Sophia; McCowan, Brenda (August 2004). "Barking in domestic dogs: context specificity and individual identification". Animal Behaviour. 68 (2): 343–355. doi:10.1016/j.anbehav.2003.07.016. S2CID 16938966.
- Yin, Sophia; Fernandez, Eduardo J.; Pagan, Sabrina; Richardson, Sarah L.; Snyder, Greg (September 2008). "Efficacy of a remote-controlled, positive-reinforcement, dog-training system for modifying problem behaviors exhibited when people arrive at the door". Applied Animal Behaviour Science. 113 (1–3): 123–138. doi:10.1016/j.applanim.2007.11.001.
- Hammerle, Marcy; Horst, Christine; Levine, Emily; Overall, Karen; Radosta, Lisa; Rafter-Ritchie, Marcia; Yin, Sophia (July 2015). "2015 AAHA Canine and Feline Behavior Management Guidelines". Journal of the American Animal Hospital Association. 51 (4): 205–221. doi:10.5326/JAAHA-MS-6527. PMID 26191821.

=== Books ===
- Yin, Sophia A.; Nolte, Inge (2007). Switzer, Elinor (ed.). Praxisleitfaden Hund und Katze (in German). Translated by Switzer, Elinor (2nd ed.). Hannover: Schlütersche. ISBN 9783899930344. OCLC 974086246.
- Low stress handling, restraint and behavior modification of dogs & cats : techniques for developing patients who love their visits. Davis, CA: CattleDog Publishing. 2009. ISBN 9780964151840. OCLC 980894296.
- The small animal veterinary nerdbook (3rd ed.). Davis, CA: CattleDog Pub. 2010. ISBN 9780964151857.
- How to behave so your dog behaves (2nd ed.). Neptune City, NJ: T.F.H. Publications. 2010. ISBN 9780793806447. OCLC 587229878.
- Perfect puppy in seven days : how to start your puppy off right. Davis, CA: CattleDog Publishing. 2011. ISBN 9780964151871. OCLC 755931823.
- How to greet a dog and what to avoid. Davis, CA: CattleDog Publishing. 2012. ISBN 9780983789246. OCLC 879581733.
