= Shaun Ellis (wolf researcher) =

Wolf researcher (born 1964)

- Born: 12 October 1964 (age 62); King's Lynn, Norfolk, England
- Occupation: Animal researcher
- Years active: 1967–present
- Known for: Research of wolves
- Partner: Kim Ellis
- Children: 5

Shaun Ellis (born 12 October 1964) is a British animal researcher who lived among wolves, and adopted a pack of abandoned North American timber wolf pups. He is the founder of Wolf Pack Management and is involved in a number of research projects in Poland and at Yellowstone National Park in the United States.

He has worked with wolves since 1990, and before that he studied the red fox in the UK, and then coyotes in Canada.

== Early life ==
Brought up deep in the countryside in the small village of Great Massingham, which is near King's Lynn Norfolk, he began observing wild animals at a young age, learning to use his sense of smell and sound to find his way at night when studying foxes and badgers.

Ellis first trained to be a gamekeeper, but left the job when the Head gamekeeper found out that Ellis was feeding rather than culling foxes. He then joined and served with the Royal Marines.

After he left the Marines he contacted a Native American biologist, Levi Holt, and from their meeting he was able to spend several months living at the Wolf Education and Research Center on Nez Perce tribal lands in northern Idaho, United States as a volunteer in a project studying wolves at the foot of the Rocky Mountains. They taught him how to observe wolves, and he was able to get into a pack of wolves and live among them. He recorded wild wolf howls and gradually learned to identify individual pack members and began to realise that wolves are highly intelligent and instinctive individuals that show trust and balance within their pack's social structure.

== Career ==
He was the founder and head of Wolf Pack Management at Combe Martin Wildlife Park in North Devon where he worked with 17 captive wolves, which included four pups born on 19 May 2008. There were originally six wolves at the park which he rescued from private ownership. He also used to regularly give educational talks about wolves.

In 2005 Ellis spent 18 months living in captivity at Combe Martin Wildlife Park with three abandoned wolf pups - Yana, Tamaska and Matsi, educating them to be wild wolves.

Ellis also claims, in The Man Who Lives with Wolves, to have spent two years living as a member of a wild wolf pack in Idaho. He told a reporter for The Guardian, "I ate what they ate, mostly raw deer and elk, which they would often bring back for me, or fruit and berries. I never fell ill and my body adapted quickly to its new diet". Despite the food being generally unappealing, Ellis commented that, when you're hungry enough, even raw meat begins to look appetizing.

Ellis has spent much of his adult life studying and living with wolves and has learned to communicate with them through scent and sound. He used to live directly outside the wolf enclosure at Combe Martin Wildlife Park, so that he could be in close proximity to the wolves at all times.

The research projects Ellis is involved with in Poland and Yellowstone National Park in the United States have the goal of developing humane methods to discourage wolves from entering areas of potential conflict with humans.

Ellis has stated that he would like to see wild wolves eventually reintroduced into England, where they last lived in the 17th century when the last wolves were killed. Ellis has said about wolves, "Although many people refer to wolves as savage killers, I’ve come to know and love them as family."

During the summer of 2011 Ellis relocated along with his wolves and his new wife, conservation biologist Dr Isla Fishburn, to "The Wolf Centre". The centre was located at the seaside end of Combe Martin at Newberry Farm, Woodlands. It provided Ellis with his own dedicated base of operations from which to continue his work with the wolves. The Wolf Centre was not open to the general public, however it did offer a range of experiences and encounters to the public, including meet and greet sessions with Ellis and his wolf hybrids, and courses covering dog behaviour, instruction and training.

Following complaints about noise, safety and traffic, Ellis's planning application at Combe Martin was withdrawn in 2013 and Ellis moved to Cornwall, where he set up the Wolf and Dog Development Centre in Truro.

== Books ==
Ellis has written five books about wolves: The Wolf Talk (2003), Spirit of the Wolf (2006), The Man Who Lives with Wolves (with Penny Junor, 2009) Living With Wolves (2010) and The Wolf Within: How I Learned To Talk Dog (2011). In 2004 BBC South West nominated Ellis as a "Local Champion" in South West England, a campaign that aims to highlight the work of people who are not always publicly recognised. He was featured on BBC Radio 4 on 2 May 2005 in a programme A Life with Wolves.

The character of "Luke Warren in the book, 'The Lone Wolf' by Jodi Picoult was loosely based on Shaun, Jodi did extensive research on Shaun while researching her book.

== Television appearances ==
=== The Wolfman ===
Ellis was the subject of a documentary, The Wolfman which first aired on Five in the UK as The Wolfman on 18 May 2007, and has also been shown on the National Geographic Channel in the United States, where it was titled A Man Among Wolves. The documentary shows how, by carefully mimicking wolf behaviour, Ellis was able to raise the three wolf cubs to maturity. It also shows how his expertise brought him to the attention of a Polish farmer, whose livestock had suffered wolf attacks. Since wolves are a protected species in Poland the farmer hoped that Ellis might be able to find some non-violent way to deter the marauding pack. Ellis travelled to Poland to study the local pack, bringing with him audio recordings of wolf howls.

Ellis believed that if the local wolves heard howls coming from the farm they would believe another pack had already claimed it as their territory, and keep clear to avoid a conflict. In order for this to work Ellis had to determine the size of the pack and play back recordings of a similar-sized pack. Initial results were encouraging and in the first few weeks after the farmer began playing the recordings the farm suffered no further attacks. The documentary then shows Ellis returning to Devon, where he attempted to reintegrate himself with the three wolves. In his absence the wolves had established a new hierarchy, and though they recognised Ellis and welcomed him back he was now the pack's omega, relegated to a peace-keeping role between the new alpha and beta males.

==== Reactions ====
Ellis, along with his program Man among Wolves, has been criticized by the International Wolf Center for perceived sensationalism. Nancy Gibson, a wolf biologist who'd studied under L. David Mech, wrote the following in regards to Ellis's methods of raising wolf pups alone:

I have raised far more captive wolves than the "Man Among Wolves," Shaun Ellis... Rearing 10-day-old pups into adulthood takes a trained group of individuals, just like a pack. When humans take a break from the wolves, others need to be present for consistent care that includes feeding, immunizations and critical handling to limit time under the care of a veterinarian. Ellis did a disservice to the longtime experience of wolf caregivers, if, in fact, he was the sole caregiver, as implied.

Criticism was also leveled at his attempts to teach wolves how to howl and hunt, which Gibson asserted comes naturally to them. David Mech himself stated "Mr. Ellis is neither a scientist nor an expert on the natural behavior of wolves." Denise Taylor, the executive director of the UK Wolf Conservation Trust, dismissed Ellis's methodology as part of "the macho-driven pursuits of the seemingly burgeoning number of TV presenters who think it is acceptable to drag what are perceived to be scary and highly dangerous creatures from their habitats, and wrestle with them and dominate them".

=== Martin Clunes: A Man and His Dogs ===
Ellis featured in the first episode of Martin Clunes: A Man and His Dogs, a two-part documentary that aired on ITV on 24 August 2008 in which Clunes explores the canine world, and visited Ellis in Devon as part of an attempt to discover what binds wolves with pet dogs, with Ellis revealing that a lot of dog behaviour which is interpreted as human, is inherited from the wolf's hierarchical pack instincts. Filmed in January 2008, Clunes joined Ellis with the pack at Combe Martin.

=== Living with the Wolfman ===
Living with the Wolfman is an eight-part documentary about Ellis which aired in the United States on Animal Planet in October and November 2008. It is also due to be shown in the UK on Five. The documentary follows Ellis as he lives with the wolf pack at Combe Martin and his relationship with his partner, Helen and their life in Devon. It also shows how Ellis integrated his girlfriend into the pack.

=== Mr and Mrs Wolf ===
In February 2009, Five screened a follow-up two-part documentary, Mr and Mrs Wolf which focused on his attempts to get partner Helen Jeffs adopted as a member by the wolf pack at Combe Martin, as a new "wolf nanny" for the pregnant alpha female, Cheyenne. The programme aired on 17 and 24 February.

=== Stan Lee's Superhuman ===
He has also appeared on the US History Channels show Stan Lee's Superhuman, which documents real-life superheroes from around the world.

=== The Lion Man: One World African Safari ===
In fifth episode of the first season of TV show The Lion Man: African Safari, Craig Busch, an experienced self-taught "wild cat trainer" pays a visit to Shaun Ellis.

== Bibliography ==
- The Wolf Talk. Rainbow Publishing. 2003. ISBN 1-899057-03-X.
- Spirit of the Wolf Talk. Parragon. 2006. ASIN B000R0HZ1U.
- The Man Who Lives with Wolves. HarperCollins. 2009. ISBN 978-0-00-732716-4.
- Wolf Within: How I Learned to Talk Dog. Harper. 2011. ISBN 978-0-00-732717-1.
