= Talk to the Animals (TV series) =

- Starring: 1993 series Dr. Harry Cooper, Sallianne Deckert, Richard Fitzgerald, Pam Graham, Jane Holmes, Mike Lester, Steve Oemcke, Kelly Pummeroy. 2006 series Dr. Katrina Warren; Nicky Buckley, Sallianne Deckert, Pete Lazer, Dr. Melissa Meehan, Dr. Chris Brown, Des Dowling, Chris Humfrey, Dr. Jo Righetti.
- Country of origin: Australia
- No. of episodes: 173 (1993–96); 100+ (2006–2010)

Production
- Running time: 60 & 30 minutes per episode (inc. commercials)
- Production companies: FM-TV (1993–1996); WTFN Entertainment (2006–2010)

Original release
- Network: Seven Network (1993–96); Nine Network (2006–2010)
- Release: 1993 - 1996; 2006 - 2010

Talk to the Animals is an Australian television series. It originally was broadcast on the Seven Network between 1993 and 1996, where it was hosted by Harry Cooper. In 2006, the show was relaunched on the Nine Network with Nicky Buckley and the veterinarian Chris Brown hosting. In 2010, Dr. Katrina Warren took over the hosting duties. The program also screened internationally on Animal Planet. The series focuses on the extraordinary relationships between people and animals. It ranges from adventures in the wild to domestic pet advice.
