= Chris Humphrey (disambiguation) =

Chris Humphrey (born 1987) is a Jamaican professional footballer.

Chris Humphrey may also refer to:

- Chris Humphrey (cricketer) (born 1972), Barbadian cricketer
- Chris Humphrey (politician) (fl. 2010s–2020s), American politician
- Christopher Humphrey, academic, see Fellow of the Academy of Social Sciences

== See also ==
- Chris Humfrey (fl. 2010s–2020s), Australian zoologist and television personality
- Chris Humphries (disambiguation)
