= Bad Dog =

The phrase "bad dog" is spoken to domestic dogs when they have misbehaved or disobeyed instructions.

Bad Dog may also refer to:

== Radio stations ==
- WGFG, Orangeburg, South Carolina
- WMXZ, Isle of Palms, South Carolina
- WSCZ, Winnsboro, North Carolina
- WWBD, Sumter, South Carolina

== Television ==
- Bad Dog!, a reality series on Animal Planet
- Bad Dog (TV series), a 1998–1999 Canadian cartoon series
- "Bad Dog" (Beavis and Butt-head), an episode of Beavis and Butt-head
- "Bad Dog" (Frasier), an episode of Frasier

== Other media ==
- Bad Dog (comics), a comic series by Joe Kelly and Diego Greco
- Bad Dog (series), a novel series written by Martin Ed Chatterton for Scholastic
- "Bad Dog", a screen saver in the After Dark series
- The Bad Dog Theatre Company, an improvisational theatre company in Toronto, Canada
- Bad Dogs, the male half of Vivid BAD SQUAD in Hatsune Miku: Colorful Stage!
