= Kamo Wildlife Sanctuary =

- Interactive map of Kamo Wildlife Sanctuary
- 35.6936°S 174.2122°E
- Location: 124 Gray Road, Kamo, Whangārei, New Zealand
- Land area: 80 acres (32 ha)
- No. of animals: 3
- No. of species: 1
- Major exhibits: Lions
- Website: http://www.kingdomofzion.co.nz

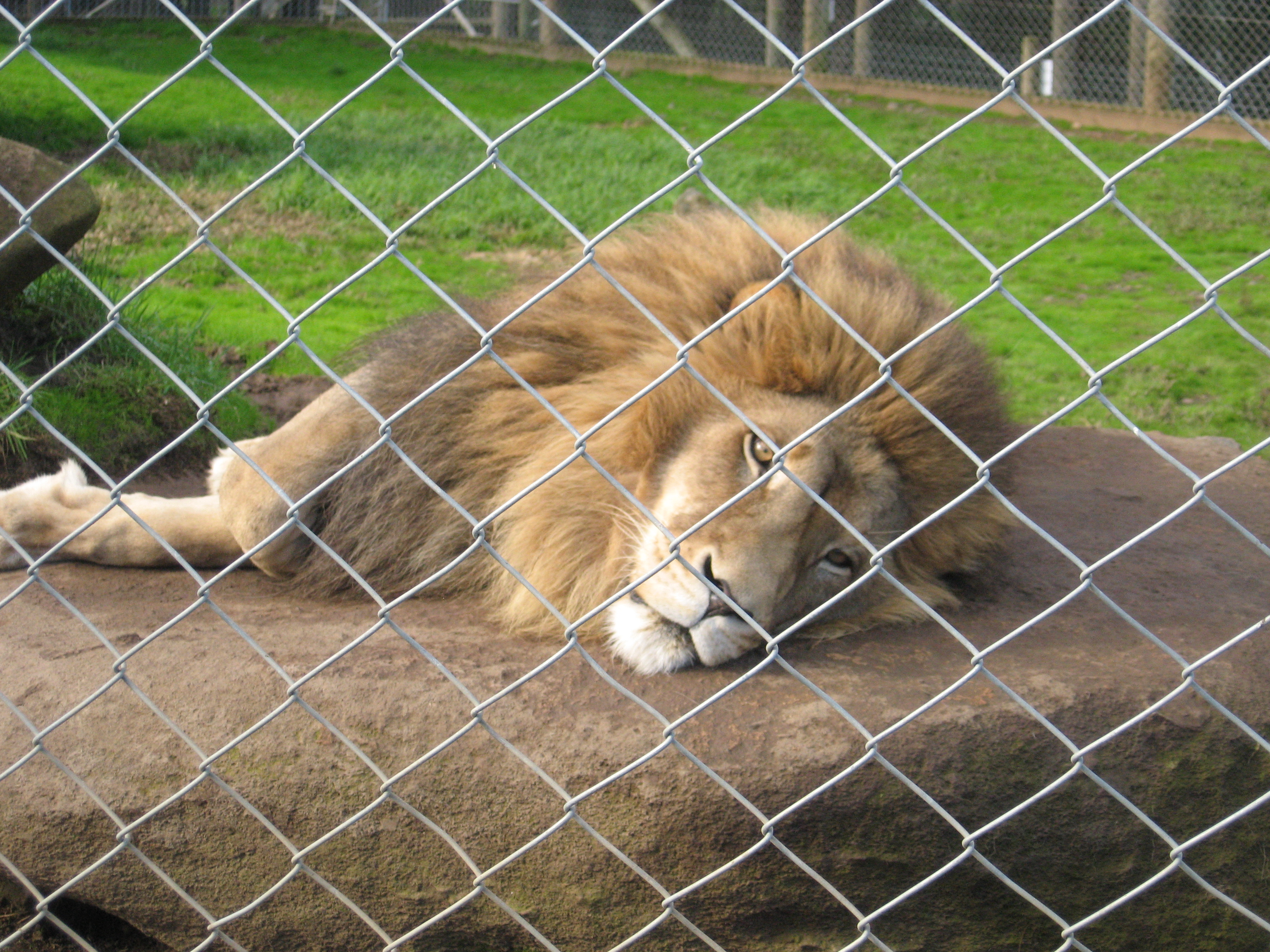
Resident African lion "Zion"

Kamo Wildlife Sanctuary, previously known as Kingdom of Zion and Zion Wildlife Gardens, was a privately owned zoo located near Kamo, Whangārei, New Zealand. The facility housed a collection of large cats and was featured in New Zealand reality television series The Lion Man from 2004 to 2008. The park was ordered closed in 2014 due to animal confinement upgrading requirements and remained closed from mid-2014 to mid-2021. It was then closed again in 2023 and sporadically reopened. In August 2025, the land and buildings were listed for sale and the park closed on 2 November 2025. Its owner, Bolton Equities, said the remaining seven elderly lions would be humanely euthanised due to age-related decline and the impracticality of relocation, but they did not carry out the full euthanasia plan. In January 2026 the property was purchased. Since the park's closure, three of the lions have been euthanized due to declining health and one died naturally (possibly due to cancer). It remains closed, with the three remaining lions still resident.

== Zion Wildlife Gardens ==
Craig Busch established Zion Wildlife Gardens in 2002 from bare land situated on Gray Road, Kamo, Whangārei. Busch had previously had the zoo based at Kerikeri.

During 2006 Zion Wildlife Gardens became financially troubled. Busch accepted a bail-out package from his mother Patricia Busch and, in accordance with an agreement dated 13 July 2006, he resigned as director and appointed Mrs Busch as sole director. Busch continued working at Zion until his dismissal on 3 November 2008.

During November 2008, media reports revealed an investigation into the welfare of the cats at the zoo had been conducted by Ministry of Agriculture and Forestry. Concerns included animals being kept in unsanitary conditions, damaged enclosures and the surgical declawing of 21 lions and 9 tigers. In February 2009, the Ministry of Primary Industries (formerly MAF) released the results of its investigation into the surgical declawing of 21 lions and 9 tigers at the facility between 2000 and May 2008. The report revealed vets had been initially approached by Busch to have the procedures done. Busch had requested the procedures to be kept in confidence. The findings in the report found any question of prosecutions under the Animal Welfare Act 1999 were problematic due to Ministry of Primary Industries veterinarians being aware of, but not questioning, the procedures at the time.

On 27 May 2009 a zookeeper, South African national Dalu Mncube, was mauled to death by a white tiger while cleaning an enclosure. The tiger was shot dead in order to reach Mncube. The tiger, a 260-kilogram (570 lb) male named Abu, had bitten another handler earlier the same year, who was rescued by Mncube. The park closed and re-opened after less than one month, following changes to the big cat enclosures to improve safety for handlers and the public. In December 2013, the Coroner's report on the inquest into the death of senior cat handler Mncube cleared the management and staff of any wrongdoing in relation to the incident. Shortland recommended regulatory reform and new legislation for health and safety in zoos and animal parks.

During June 2013 Zion Wildlife Gardens operator Patricia Busch lost her assets. The finance company that held the security over the property took possession, after Busch was unable to continue the mortgage payments.

== Receivership ==
David Bridgman and Colin McCloy of Price Waterhouse Coopers Limited were appointed receivers of the company that operated Zion Wildlife Gardens, Zion Wildlife Gardens Limited (In Receivership & In Liquidation), on 26 July 2011. Subsequent to this, the official assignee was appointed liquidator of the company on 22 August 2011, after the Inland Revenue made a successful application to the High Court to have Zion Wildlife Gardens Ltd placed into liquidation.

On 31 January 2012 the receivers announced the sale of Zion Wildlife Gardens Ltd. to Zion Wildlife Kingdom Ltd. The receivers had been on site that morning to advise those at the park of the sale. Details of the sale were considered to be commercially sensitive and as a result, the receivers did not comment further on the sale and purchase agreement or the new owners.

== Kingdom of Zion ==
On 31 January 2012, the park with land and assets was sold to Zion Wildlife Kingdom Ltd, owned by Tauranga-based accountant Ian Stevenson and Cambridge-based businesswoman Tracey McVerry and Nicholas Mes. On 5 April 2012 the facility was reopened as Kingdom of Zion. The day-to-day management of the facility was through Earth Crest Limited, which had as its sole shareholder Suzanne Eisenhut.

On 10 May 2012, Zion Wildlife Kingdom co-director and shareholder and chartered accountant Ian Stevenson was censured by the New Zealand Institute of Chartered Accountants, and was ordered to pay the $42,889 cost of his prosecution. Stevenson pleaded guilty to three charges arising from a client complaint; dealing with client monies through his practice account rather than a trust account, withdrawing fees without authority and preparing accounts without due care and diligence.

In April 2013, Tauranga-based business consultant Sam Bailey applied unsuccessfully to the High Court in Tauranga to have the park's operating company Earth Crest Limited placed into liquidation. Associate High Court Judge Jeremy Doogue reserved his decision into the application made by Bailey to liquidate Earth Crest Ltd (trading as Kingdom of Zion Ltd) after the hearing in May 2013.

In October 2013, the Employment Relations Authority gave former employee Neville Bradford leave to pursue an unjustified dismissal claim against Earth Crest Limited. Bradford had been dismissed in July 2012, after working at Kingdom of Zion as a groundsman since the end of January 2012. During May 2014, the Employment Relations Authority ruled Earth Crest Ltd had to pay Bradford $11,000. The amount related to unpaid wages owed to him. The Authority found Bradford had not been unjustifiably dismissed by Earth Crest Limited.

In November 2013, Ian Stevenson was struck off by the New Zealand Institute of Chartered Accountants. He was charged with conduct unbecoming of an accountant and negligence and/or incompetence in a professional capacity. He was also charged with breaching the NZICA's rule 21.4(b) and breaching the institute's code of ethics.

On 31 January 2014 the shareholding and directorship of Zion Wildlife Kingdom Ltd was transferred to Bolton Equities Ltd, an Auckland-based investment company.

In July 2014, the Ministry of Primary Industries ordered the zoo to close to the public until the enclosures were upgraded to meet containment requirements.

During early August, the business operated by Earth Crest Limited was purchased by Bolton Equities. The company planned to upgrade the zoo facility for a future major tourist attraction with the name changed to Kamo Wildlife Sanctuary.

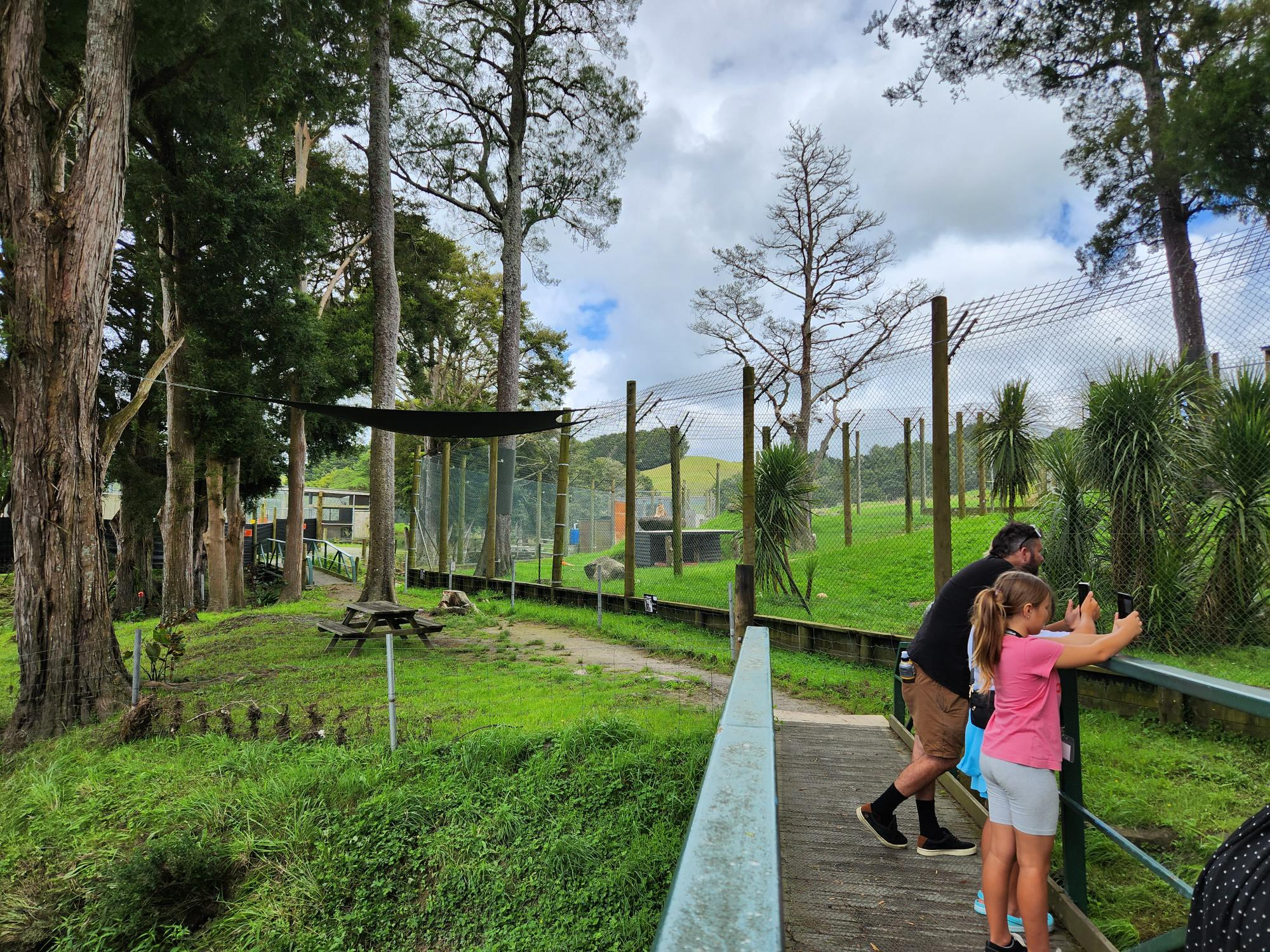

== Kamo Wildlife Sanctuary ==
Kamo Wildlife Sanctuary was established in 2014 by Bolton Equities after the Ministry of Primary Industries closed its predecessor Kingdom of Zion citing compliance issues. In 2015 it was reported the zoo was still closed as Kamo Wildlife Sanctuary management worked its way through a list of remedial work required. During October 2021 it was reported in the Northern Advocate the animals at the facility were at risk of being euthanised after it was alleged MPI had continued to delay the granting of a licence for the zoo to open. The landowner Bolton Equities had spent more than NZ$9 million upgrading the enclosures and facilities at the site. In November 2021, MPI granted Janette Vallance and Kamo Wildlife Sanctuary the necessary licences to operate; it opened to the public 14 December 2021.

Big Cats Ltd, the operating arm of the business, was placed into involuntary liquidation on 1 March 2023. Its operator Janette Vallance stated at the time negotiations were underway with the liquidator, the Official Assignee, and other stakeholders. Janette Vallance's company took over operations to continue to care for the animals while a review and restructure took place. The facility reopening September of 2023. A co-director of Big CatsLimited, Dale Vallance was found guilty on eight charges of indecently assaulting four women and remanded in custody. A media release stated that Vallance had no input into staffing, manager or any operations since his arrest in August 2021, however he was listed on the official website as director and general manager as late as January 2022. With his refusal to resign as a director, this was eventually resolved with the liquidation of Big Cats Limited. A new operations company, JFV Limited, was in place in March 2023. JFV Limited was now solely owned and operated by Janette Vallance. In September 2023 permission was given for re-opening of the facility and a successful reopen day was held on 16 September. Vallance allowed those with pre-purchased vouchers with valid dates to be redeem them until early 2024.

The big cats continued to receive care from the team at KWS during this time. Bolton Equities provided funding to continue to provide and maintain high levels of containment and welfare. This was monitored by MPI throughout without issue.

Janette Vallance and her team continued to operate the facility without incident. The property (land and buildings) are currently listed for sale by tender by Bolton Equities.

On 4 November 2025, the Northern Advocate reported the seven remaining animals at the zoo would be euthanizsd that week due to ageing. The cats were aged between 18 and 21 years old. Bolton Equities had notified MPI of its decision on 3 November 2025. The animals would be humanely euthanised under the guidelines required by the Animal Welfare Act, with an MPI representative observing. Two animals, white lioness Imvula, 21, and white lion Sibili, 18, were euthanised due to major health issues. Operator Janette Vallance confirmed their deaths, after advising the media there was the possibility the remaining five lions could be saved, due to some new parties interested in purchasing the property, where the zoo is located. In early 2026 the sanctuary was bought by a consortium of investors, which saved the five lions from euthanasia. The animal rescue organisation HUHA (Helping You Help Animals) helped find the investors. In April, 20-year-old lion Abdullah was euthanized due to longstanding respiratory issues.
