= Dark Days in Monkey City =

- Genre: Nature; Documentary; Drama
- Written by: Ian McGee
- Narrated by: John Rhys-Davies
- Composer: The Sound Room
- Countries of origin: New Zealand; United States
- Original language: English
- No. of series: 1
- No. of episodes: 13

Production
- Executive producers: Lawrence Cumbo (NHNZ); Erin Wanner (Animal Planet)
- Producer: Ian McGee
- Production location: Sri Lanka
- Cinematography: Stephen Downes; Scott Mouat
- Running time: 22 minutes
- Production company: NHNZ Ltd.

Original release
- Network: Animal Planet
- Release: 24 February – 14 May 2009

Related
- Temple Troop

Dark Days in Monkey City is an Animal Planet documentary series about the lives of wild toque macaques in Sri Lanka. In the tradition of Meerkat Manor it followed the stories of individual primates, but differed from earlier shows by adding special effects and transitional animation (in the style of comic-book panels).

It was devised as part of Animal Planet's strategy to re-brand itself as an "entertainment" network. Its entire 13-episode run was broadcast in 2009.

== Production details ==
NHNZ had story boarded the action in advance, and shot the macaques (on location) for a month against portable green screens. Though that green screen footage was used (combined with CGI in post production.) the original script was abandoned in favor of the animals' real behavior—according to series producer Ian McGee.

After green screen filming was complete, the cameras followed the most charismatic monkeys for ten weeks in their natural habitat.

== Reception ==
Most critics gave moderate recommendations, but preferred Meerkat Manor in the "docu-soap hybrid" genre, feeling Dark Days was over-produced and less credible. Many felt its "intense" visual style (indebted to 300 and Sin City) didn't match the available live action footage, and that the narration was overblown.

=== Broadcast schedule ===
The announced schedule was to air all 13 episodes in successive weeks on Animal Planet (starting 2009-02-24) but only two weeks (and four episodes) were shown on that initial run. All 13 episodes were broadcast later in 2009, and were released on DVD (which included a 14th, "making-of" episode).

== Smithsonian Primate Project ==
This is only the latest TV series to be based on the Smithsonian Institution Primate Biology Program (PBP) in the "Monkey City", Polonnaruwa. At least two earlier series have documented the PBP's animals, including "The Temple Troop" which followed the Temple Macaques for an entire year.

Dark Days in Monkey City uses footage from the PBP, which has been studying the Polonnaruwa macaques since 1968 (and is the longest continuous study of vertebrate population dynamics in a varying environment). The study's conductor, Wolfgang Dittus said, "We have promoted and participated in film documentaries on the premise that the public will conserve only that which they love, and love only that which they understand".

== Plot ==
The central narrative over the series' 13 episodes is the struggle between two macaque tribes: the Black Claws, and the Temple Troop.

=== Temple Troop ===
The program begins with "Temple Troop", a troop of toque macaques who live in a temple area known as Fig Tree Vale. The vale is abundant in figs and water. The troop was led by Lear, the king of the troop who had been its dominant male for 4 years. One of Lear's biggest concerns was the threat of deposal, and that threat came with the arrival of Hector. Hector had recently joined the troop and seemed discontent with his position within it. Hector challenged the old king and during a large scuffle, Lear fell to the ground from a tree, which cost him his throne. Hector was the new king of Temple Troop and took full advantage of his new authority. Hector bullied his subordinates, but to secure his regime, he needed the support of Gemini, the matriarch of the Troop.

The Temple Troop's arch rivals, the Black Claws, invaded their territory, and drove the Temple Troop from it. Exiled to the bad lands, the troop were joined by a wandering male called Che, who proved to be an asset, especially to Gemini and Portia. They tried to invade a market but were driven back to the bad lands by a city troop. As Che was settling into the troop, his wandering band of bachelor males returned, giving Hector an excuse to banish him. Che attacked his former band to remain in the troop, and later he convinced both groups to merge.

With more warriors to fight the Black Claws the exile Temple Troop marched towards Fig Tree Vale to confront their ancient foes.

=== Black Claws ===
The Black Claws are a street bred troop of toque macaques who live in the periphery of Monkey City, relying of tourists for food. The troop's queen, Pandora, tried to use the opportunity of the Temple Troop males' supremacy battle to capture their abundant territory. She and the Black Claws are the drama's antagonists.

The Black Claws' king Goliath led a small attack on the Vale; this was repulsed, but it was followed by a mass invasion from the entire Black Claw troop. Stronger and more numerous, the Black Claws prevailed in the ensuing battle, killing Lear, and expelling the Temple Troop from Monkey City. (The Black Claws had prospered under queen Pandora with the growth in city trash.)

As Pandora settled into her new territory, a troop of langur monkeys tried to capture Fig Tree Vale. The Black Claws drove them off, but Pandora disappeared and was found to have died of an unknown cause (ascribed by the program makers to having attacked the sacred Hanuman langurs). Pandora's youngest daughter, Scarlett became the new queen of the Black Claws. The king of the Black Claws, Goliath, was concerned about the new matriarch, needing to win her favor to remain king. Scarlett was ruthless and greedy with food, not allowing the lower class near any figs. (The Black Claws, comprised two bickering clans: workers & aristocrats, both of which Pandora had dominated.) The leader of this lower clan was Jezebel, who had tired of Scarlett monopolizing the food. Unable to directly defeat Scarlett and her aristocratic sisters, Jezebel led her half of the troop back to their ancestral lands, the car park. To start a troop she needed a king, so she subverted a subordinate Black Claw aristocrat into defection. Scarlett responded with an attack on Jezebel's troop, making her back down. This civil war concludes as Temple Troop begin their march back to Fig Tree Vale.

== The macaques ==
The Smithsonian Primate Project names all 4,000 individuals in its study, but the show substituted the names of iconic characters from Tragedy. Below are the names and main narrative arcs selected by the writers:

=== Lear ===
Lear's kingship was threatened by Hector, an ambitious recent recruit. Lear watched as his rival forced his authority on the other monkeys, until confronting Hector with a stare. Hector backed down, but later gathered male allies from within the troop and confronted the king. Lear fought Hector in a tree, and was knocked to the ground; he survived but was dethroned.

When the Black Claws first attacked Fig Tree Vale, Lear played an active role in its defense. And, when Portia's baby was seen by a feral dog Lear confronted it, saving his offspring. But Lear was killed by the Black Claws when they invaded in full strength.

=== Gemini ===
Gemini and her sisterhood are the core of the troop and Gemini ruled Fig Tree Vale, her lifelong home. Gemini showed advances to Hector behind Lear's back and when Hector became brutal and attacked an infant, Gemini expected Lear to act; when he did not she turned her attention to the pretender, Hector.

While in exile, the Temple Troop met Che, whose foraging skills impressed her more than Hector's selfish consumption. Che led Gemini and the Temple Troop to the land of the humans and the troop found food, but while the troop was crossing a road one of infants was hit by a car. The merger with Che's band of wandering males gave Gemini the confidence to lead her Temple Troop back to Monkey City.

=== Hector ===
Hector used brutality to establish himself as chief rival for Lear's throne, finally provoking the king by an attack on his queen, Gemini. Lear confronted Hector but allowed Hector to back down and grow in confidence. After building alliances with other males and gaining Gemini's attention Hector challenged Lear to battle.

Hector, triumphantly claimed the throne after dislodging Lear from the tree they had fought in. He won the advances of queen Gemini and authority over all members, including Lear.

After the second Black Claw incursion on Temple Troop territory war broke out between the two tribes; Hector's troop was defeated. In exile water was scarce, but when Hector found a tap, he drank and took a bath from it, never sharing with the other members of the troop. Hector tried to lead the troop back to their home range from the bad lands, but Gemini overruled him and lead them into the city. Hector was uneasy at the sight of people; as a wandering male he had seen his brother captured. He allowed Che's band to join his troop, despite the growing threat from Che, so that they might be strong enough to regain Fig Tree Vale.

=== Portia ===
Portia was the lowest ranking female in the troop, and the central character in the documentary. She hoped for Lear not to lose his position to Hector, who often attacked low ranking monkeys like Portia. The program makers emphasized her fear that if Hector rose to power he would kill the babies fathered by the previous king, including her unborn baby by Lear. (Hector ultimately killed no infants, and though rare macaque infanticides occur, some researchers say it doesn't specifically target offspring of the previous leader.)

When Portia found food, she was often displaced by Gemini, the queen of the Temple Troop and the other high ranking females. In exile Hector found a tap with dripping water, but Portia had to wait for her turn behind high ranking infants, and the tap dried up before she had a chance to use it.

Portia's fortunes improved with the arrival of Che, a wandering male who managed to join the Temple Troop after a romantic meeting with Portia.

She was the first to discover a rice field and the troop briefly had abundant food, but people soon put the troop to flight, and while crossing the road, one of the troop's infants was hit by a car. Portia held on to her own baby tightly.

When Temple Troop marched back to Monkey City Portia tried to give her son a better life by rising up the hierarchy. She was constantly being bullied by Cassandra (her cousin, and a high ranked female). Portia watched as Cassandra bullied Ophelia (another low ranking female in the Temple Troop). Portia allied with Ophelia to drive Cassandra down the pecking order, and increase her own status.

=== Che ===
Che was a wandering male who had encountered the Temple Troop many times before. He got together with Portia in the forest, and when she rejoined the troop Che joined the Temple Troop with total confidence.

While in the forest, one of Gemini's adolescent daughters was playing in the leaf litter when Che saw a python and sounded an alarm. This ensured the troop's safety and impressed Gemini, but king Hector saw Che as a rival. Che was experienced in the bad lands and led the Temple Troop into the land of the humans. Hector was reluctant to follow, but was unwilling to leave his queen alone with Che.

Che suddenly left the Temple Troop and joined the resident city troop, who were said to be former members of his wandering band. In their second visit, the Temple Troop came into conflict with the city troop and among the fighters at the city troop's front line, was Che. As the two troops fought, Che suddenly switched again and sided with the Temple Troop, attacking the city troop. Che and Temple Troop were forced to retreat.

Just when Che was settling into the Temple Troop, his roving band of bachelor males showed up. He knew that the presence of the wandering males would give Hector an excuse to banish him, so, while Hector was watching, Che attacked the wandering males and drove then away. Hector was impressed—though still uneasy of Che. When the wandering males returned Che persuaded them to join the Temple Troop, swelling their army enough to fight for Fig Tree Vale.
