= Tristan Bayer =

American actor (born 1977)

- Born: Tristan Alexander Bayer; April 30, 1977 (age 49); Jackson Hole, Wyoming, U.S.
- Occupations: Filmmaker, actor, host
- Years active: 1999 – present

Tristan Bayer (born April 30, 1977 in Jackson Hole, Wyoming) is an American actor, filmmaker and the host of the Animal Planet series Caught in the Moment, and was nominated for an Emmy for individual achievement in a craft: cinematography.

Caught in the Moment is a 10 part 1 hour series about Bayer, a young wildlife filmmaker, who goes on global adventures to film endangered species and animals in rare, beautiful and time-sensitive moments.

== Early life ==
Bayer's first production experience occurred when he was just 2 weeks old and he began traveling with his parents, a wildlife filmmaking team that journeyed around the world to shoot documentaries.

When Bayer was 2 years old, he traveled with his parents to East Africa, where they were making a film on elephants. He began learning about other cultures and memorizing the Swahili names of animals while floating above the African landscape in hot air balloons and chasing elephants in Range Rovers. These experiences were the building blocks for his global point of view while growing up in the small town of Jackson Hole, Wyoming, on the outskirts of Grand Teton and Yellowstone national parks.

Throughout his schooling, Bayer took advantage of every opportunity to work overseas as a crew member with his father, renowned cinematographer, Wolfgang Bayer. They made wildlife films for such companies as Discovery Networks, Nature, Nova, National Geographic, ABC and PBS. Bayer started keeping written journals and sketches, and then took up still photography and videography. He began shooting behind-the-scenes video of his trips and presented his adventures to his classmates back in Wyoming. In junior high school, Bayer created multimedia "show-and-tell" presentations that entertained and educated his peers. Bayer's work was published in Ranger Rick on three occasions.

== Film career ==
Bayer moved to Los Angeles in 1997 where he began working as a cinematographer and host of television shows which aired on TBS, FOX Family Channel, BBC, National Geographic Channel, and Discovery Networks.

Bayer then was approached to host Wild Life! Adventures: Wildlife Legacy, credited as host, associated producer and wildlife cinematographer on an hour-long episode in a series hosted predominately by celebrity personalities. "Wildlife Legacy" features Bayer learning from artists who use their craft to help protect the wildlife that they portray. Bayer was the youngest non-celebrity host for the series.

Bayer is featured as a field correspondent and wildlife cinematographer on six episodes of the television series World Gone Wild. He directed, produced, and shot a segment for their pilot filming polar bears in Churchill, Canada.

In 1999 Bayer was awarded the BBC / Time-Life Natural History Innovation Grant of $100,000 for the most innovative idea of a new television series. Bayer and his crew went on to shoot a pilot episode for his idea of a series entitled Tripping on location in Borneo, Taiwan, Hong Kong, and Yellowstone National Park.

Bayer co-directed, wrote, edited, narrated, and starred in a feature-length film, Earthling. Earthling won the EarthWatch Institute "Film of the Year" award in association with National Geographic and had a pre-screening of the film at the National Geographic Grosvenor Theater in Washington, D.C. Earthling had its world premiere at the 2005 Seattle International Film Festival, and won the 'Audience Choice Award' for best documentary and the Chrystal Heart award at the Heartland Film Festival. Earthling went on to win multiple awards including two 'Audience Choice Awards', 'Best Cinematography', 'Best Feature Documentary','Best Docudrama', 'Best Feature Film', 'Best Children's Film','Best Achievement in Sound', and nominated for 'Best Editing' and 'Best Writing.

Tristan Bayer is one of the directors in the artist collective, "THE MASSES", and has an office in Los Angeles.

In 2008, Bayer Bayer was hired to direct, produce, and shoot a short documentary about ocean acidification for the Natural Resources Defense Council (NRDC). The result was a 22-minute HD movie entitled ACID TEST: The Global Challenge of Ocean Acidification narrated by actress Sigourney Weaver which premiered on Discovery Communication's Planet Green channel and was made available online in its entirety at http://www.acidtestmovie.com to create public awareness and lobby Capitol Hill for urgent climate legislation leading towards the United Nations Climate Change Conference 2009.
