= Chris Humphries (disambiguation) =

Chris Humphries (1947–2009) was a British botanist.

Chris Humphries may also refer to:

- Kris Humphries (born 1985), American basketball player
- Chris Humphreys, British actor, playwright and novelist

== See also ==
- Chris Humphrey (disambiguation)
