= Harry Cooper (veterinarian) =

Australian veterinarian and television personality

Harry Cooper OAM
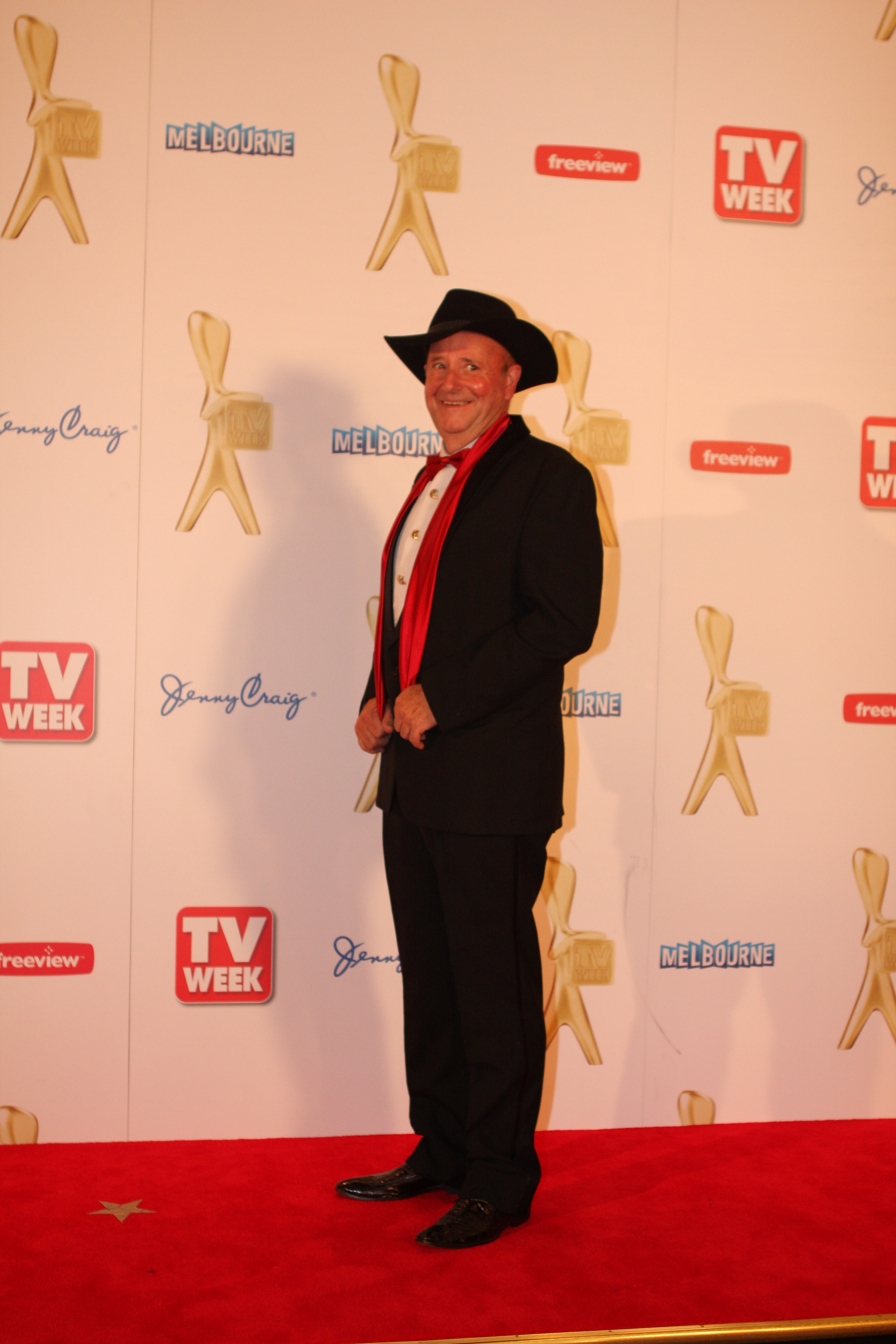
- Cooper at the 2011 Logie Awards
- Born: Harry Leonard Cooper; 20 February 1944 (age 82); Sydney, New South Wales, Australia
- Other name: Dr. Harry
- Occupations: Veterinary surgeon, television personality, media personality
- Years active: 1965−present
- Known for: Talk to the Animals; Harry's Practice; Better Homes and Gardens

Harry Leonard Cooper (born 20 February 1944), more commonly known as Dr. Harry, is an Australian veterinarian and television personality, who is best known for his media appearances.

== Biography ==
=== Early life ===
Cooper was born in 1944, in Sydney, Australia and graduated Sydney University's Faculty of Veterinary Science with second-degree honours in December 1965, at the age of 21.

=== Veterinarian career ===
He practised for several years across Sydney and the UK before his media career became a full-time commitment.

=== Media career ===
Cooper began his media career in a veterinary segment on a morning TV talk show in Sydney. Later, he became known as the resident veterinary surgeon on the long-running series Burke's Backyard. In 1993, Cooper hosted his first series, Talk to the Animals. In 1997, he began presenting the veterinary series Harry's Practice, assisted by fellow vet Katrina Warren. Despite consistently high ratings, the program was cancelled in 2003.

From 2004 onwards, Cooper has presented a veterinary segment on the lifestyle program Better Homes and Gardens. He is also an animal welfare advocate and public speaker. In July 2023, he began narrating the television series Animals Aboard with Dr. Harry.

=== Honours ===
As part of the Queen's Birthday 2014 honours, he was appointed as a Member of the Order of Australia (OAM) for his services to veterinary science and animal welfare.

=== Personal life ===
It was revealed that Cooper had been diagnosed with prostate cancer in late 2007. After more than six months of intensive radiation treatment, the cancer was in remission and he continued his appearances on TV.

After 21 years living in Tasmania, Cooper moved to the Mid-North Coast of New South Wales in 2011. In March 2012, he revealed that he had separated from Janine Morganti, his wife of 26 years. The couple had three children and have five grandchildren. His eldest daughter, Tiffany, died from colon cancer in 2012.

In 2022, he married long-time partner, Sue Sheeran, on their property at Port Macquarie, New South Wales.

Cooper believes that Australia should become a republic.
