= The Lion Man: African Safari =

- Starring: Craig Busch
- Country of origin: South Africa
- No. of series: 2
- No. of episodes: 20

Production
- Executive producers: Craig Busch; Martin Cleave (Series 1); Jane Wilson (Series 1); Damien Brown (Series 2); Graeme Swanepoel (Series 2); Solly Moeng (Series 2)
- Running time: 30 minutes
- Production companies: 2B Media (Series 1); One World Pictures (Series 2); New Vision Pictures (Series 2)

Original release
- Network: Animal Planet
- Release: 2014 – 2015

The Lion Man: African Safari is a South African television documentary series based at Jabula Big Cat Sanctuary near Rustenburg, South Africa. It is presented and narrated by "The Lion Man" Craig Busch.

Two series were produced, the first of which was produced in 2013 with filming taking place in South Africa, New Zealand and England. Series two was filmed entirely in South Africa.

== Episodes ==
=== Series One ===
Ep No.	Description
1	Craig Busch returns to Africa after spending the last two years in New Zealand. He is given an orphan white lion cub that is destined to become a friend for life.
2	Timbavati boasts some of the rarest big cats in the world. Craig heads off in search of the parks wild white lions that may be in danger to help save their gene pool.
3	Craig introduces his pal Jabula to his new environment. While poachers strike at the heart of Jabula's home, Craig lends a hand moving three big Siberian tigers.
4	The Lion Man hits the road to meet some pretty smart elephants. Jabula helps out with some local building, and Craig tries to catch a vulture - so he can set it free.
5	Craig Busch heads to England where he meets a man who has lived with wolves. A friend in Ireland has an injured tiger in his backyard and is asking for help.
6	Craig Busch receives a desperate call from his park in New Zealand to undertake some urgent surgery. He must attend to pressing issues that were left unfinished.
7	In New Zealand, Craig's focus has turned towards the tigers that are in need of help. Plus, he must bury an old friend and favourite cat.
8	Craig heads back to Africa to meet a man who uses elephants to hunt landmines and chase poachers. He is finally reunited with his best pal, Jabula.
9	Craig returns home with a new friend, a rare breed of Barbary lion who wastes no time getting to know the other cats. But raising lion cubs has its challenges.
10	Craig has secured what could be his next cat sanctuary. He finishes the building for his new rare Barbary lion cub in preparation for the next big vision.

== Animals ==
These animals featured in the television show and currently reside at Jabula Big Cat Sanctuary.

- Jabula - White Lion
- Shia Jnr - Barbary Lion
- Zantein - Barbary Lion
- Thembi - White Lion
- Saloni - Bengal Tiger
- Shika - Bengal Tiger
- Sevati - White Bengal Tiger
- Zeus - Cheetah
- Zara - Cheetah
- Zenda - Giraffe
- Tshaka - Barbary Lion
- Thambile - Barbary Lion
- Siramba - Barbary Lion
- S'bu - Barbary Lion
- Zamani - Barbary Lion
