= Cultural triangle =

Region of Sri Lanka

Map

Sri Lanka's Cultural triangle is situated in the centre of the island and covers an area which includes the World Heritage cultural sites of the Sacred City of Anuradhapura, the Ancient City of Polonnaruwa, the Ancient City of Sigiriya, the Ancient City of Dambulla and the Sacred City of Kandy. Due to the constructions and associated historical events, some of which are millennia old, these sites are of high universal value; they are visited by many pilgrims, both laymen and the clergy (prominently Buddhist), as well as by local and foreign tourists.
