= Total Zoo =

American television series

Total Zoo is an American family television program narrated by Andy Chanley. It was shown on the channel Animal Planet in 2000.

The show debuted on Animal Planet on January 2, 2001, and had 13 episodes. The second season premiered in October 2001 and had seven episodes. Zoos the show visited included the Los Angeles Zoo and the Smithsonian National Zoo.

Diana Dawson of TVData Features Syndicate said the show gives kids the ability to witness a prominent zoo's inner workings, enabling them to gain a more detailed insight into an "exotic career option".
