= Caught in the Moment =

Caught in the Moment is an American television program about trekking the globe and capturing once-in-a-lifetime moments with endangered species and other animals in natural environments. This series is hosted by Tristan Bayer and Vanessa Garnick. It was shown on Animal Planet.

== Episodes ==
1. Costa Rica - Bayer and Garnick go to Costa Rica to film the "arribada" a sea turtle mass nesting. More than 150,000 olive ridley sea turtles haul themselves up on a 1-kilometer stretch of beach. Capuchin monkeys, ghost crabs, coatis and Jesus Christ lizards or basilisks are also filmed.

2. British Columbia - Bayer and Garnick explore the Great Bear Rainforest following the Pacific salmon migration. Their main goal is to film the spirit bear, or Kermode bear. Orcas, grizzly bears, and black bears feature in this episode too.

3. Cocos Island - Bayer and Garnick travel to the largest uninhabited island off the coast of Costa Rica. Diving in at the chance Bayer and Garnick film a huge school of hammerhead shark. With some high-tech gear they get their shot. Filling the water and the episode are white-tipped shark, manta rays, and dolphins.

4. Japan - Bayer and Garnick fly to Japan to film the endangered red-crowned crane and its mating dance. With the help of Mrs. Watanabe, a Japanese woman who has been feeding the cranes in her back yard for several years, the crane is making a population comeback from only 25 to 1,00. The show also features Japanese macaques and Steller's sea eagles.

5. Madagascar - Bayer and Garnick go to Madagascar to film Verreaux's sifaka. They aim to film the acrobatic lemur's long range jump. Ring tailed lemurs and chameleons are also seem.

6. India - Bayer and Garnick find themselves in Jodphur, India hoping to film the Hanuman langurs. The langurs coexist with humans in this city. The human citizens believe they are incarnations of the Hindu god Hanuman.

Later, Bayer and Garnick travel to the red cliffs of Daijar to film more langur. The blackbuck and brown rat are given some screen time too.

7. Monterey Bay - Bayer and Garnick are now on their way to America's largest marine sanctuary, known as the "Serengeti of the Sea". Bayer and Garnick hope to film the gray whale migration, however there are killer whales or orcas waiting for these whales as they pass through the sanctuary.

8. Thailand - Bayer and Garnick visit Thailand. The mission is to film some wild Asian elephants. The only problem is that they are very much endangered in the wild. Their first stop is the city Chiang Mai, Thailand's largest city. They are appalled at the sight of young elephants on street corners being used to help beggars get some attention.

Later, they go to an elephant sanctuary which rescues elephants that were mistreated on streets and in safari camps.

9. Mongolia - Bayer and Garnick travel to Mongolia to film the wild horse, or better known as the Przewalski's horse. Also featured in the episode are marmot and vulture.

10. Best Moments - Composed of best moments from the previous nine episodes, ended with the conservation music video which Tristan Bayer had been talking all through the show. The song is Touch the Sky performed by Irish group Young Dubliners.

== Reception ==
Common Sense Media rated the show 4 out of 5 stars.
