= Beverly Hills Vet =

- Presented by: Katrina Warren
- No. of seasons: 2
- No. of episodes: 10

Original release
- Network: Animal Planet
- Release: September 2 – December 7, 2003

Beverly Hills Vet is an American television program that deals with problematic pets and their eccentric owners. This show is hosted by Katrina Warren. It was shown on the channel Animal Planet.
