= Insane Pools: Off the Deep End =

- Genre: Home Improvement, Reality
- Starring: Lucas Congdon; John "Old Man" Messner; Matt "Sunshine" Schuler; Chris "Crash" Warren; Jane "Woman" Werley
- Country of origin: United States
- Original language: English
- No. of seasons: 3
- No. of episodes: 27

Production
- Executive producers: Vin DiBona; Juliana Kim
- Running time: 45 min.
- Production company: Fishbowl Worldwide Media

Original release
- Network: Animal Planet
- Release: February 20, 2015 – August 20, 2018

Related
- Treehouse Masters, The Pool Master

Insane Pools: Off the Deep End is a home improvement show airing on Animal Planet and DIY Network that follows pool designer Lucas Congdon and his team from Lucas Lagoons. Congdon and his team renovate existing pools and build new ones on residential properties, primarily with the use of hand-selected stones from Tennessee

== Series overview ==
Season	Episodes	Originally released	
Season	Episodes	First released	Last released
1	6	February 20, 2015	March 27, 2015
2	10	February 26, 2016	May 20, 2016
3	11	June 15, 2018	August 20, 2018

== Episodes ==
=== Season 1 (2015) ===
No. overall	No. in season	Title	Original release date
1	1	"Swimming with the Fishes"	February 20, 2015
An outdated pool & new koi pond in Siesta Key, FL.
2	2	"Paradise on the Bay"	February 27, 2015
Paradise on Florida's Gulf Coast.
3	3	"Mountain Lodge Oasis"	March 6, 2015
Bringing the Rocky Mountains to Florida.
4	4	"In Hot Water"	March 13, 2015
Two pools connected by a stream in Bradenton, FL.
5	5	"Growing Pains"	March 20, 2015
A natural atrium in Sarasota, FL.
6	6	"Green with Envy"	March 27, 2015
A tropical Caribbean destination in the backyard.

=== Season 2 (2016) ===
No. overall	No. in season	Title	Original release date
7	1	"Welcome to the Jungle"	February 26, 2016
A jungle-theme with connecting island in Bradenton, FL.
8	2	"Living Under the Sea"	March 4, 2016
An under the sea-theme in Cortez, Florida
9	3	"Fiesta de Laguna"	March 11, 2016
Mexican style resort pool in Venice, Florida
10	4	"Rockin’ it in Rocket City"	March 18, 2016
A fresh build in Huntsville, Alabama
11	5	"Waterpark Wonderland"	April 1, 2016
A backyard waterpark in Parkland, Florida
12	6	"Zen & the Art of Pools"	April 8, 2016
An aquatic healing space in Parrish, Florida.
13	7	"Hidden Party Zone"	April 22, 2016
Lucas and the crew transform a tinybackyard into a luxurious 5-star resort-worthy pool
14	8	"For the Birds"	May 6, 2016
Lucas and the crew build an oasis for a family living in a designated bird sanctuary
15	9	"A Lazy River Runs Through It"	May 13, 2016
Lucas and the crew build their first lazy river pool on Pine Island
16	10	"Castle by the Sea"	May 20, 2016
Lucas and the crew build a Roman style pool on the Gulf of Mexico

=== Season 3 (2018) ===
No. overall	No. in season	Title	Original release date
17	1	"Ultimate Backyard Paradises"	June 15, 2018
Revisiting five past builds.
18	2	"What's Up Dock?"	June 16, 2018
Building a pond for a teamworker.
19	3	"Piña Pool-ada"	June 29, 2018
Tropical theme pool.
20	4	"Dream Mulligan"	July 6, 2018
A pool for a golfer.
21	5	"Top of the Mountain"	July 13, 2018
A backyard pool in Bountiful, Utah.
22	6	"Sliding Into Neverland"	July 20, 2018
A pool for golfer J.B. Holmes.
23	7	"Small Yard, Big Dream"	July 27, 2018
A small backyard pool.
24	8	"Rocks of Love"	August 3, 2018
A Mediterranean-themed backyard pool.
25	9	"From Mild to Wild"	August 13, 2018
A pool in Tampa, Florida.
26	10	"Pool-a-Vida"	August 20, 2018
A pool in Plantation, Florida.
