= DogDay =

1997 video game

- Developer(s): Eyst
- Publisher(s): Infogrames Entertainment SA
- Platform(s): Windows; PlayStation
- Release: Windows: NA: 1997; EU: 1998; PlayStation: JP: 1998
- Genre(s): Graphic adventure
- Mode(s): Single-player

DogDay is a 1997 graphic adventure game developed by Australian studio Asylum Productions, later known as Eyst and published by Infogrames Europe SA for the PlayStation and Windows. The Japanese PlayStation title translates in English as "Curiosity kills the cat?".

== Production ==
The game was published by Impact Interactive Publishing (USA), Bomico Entertainment Software (Germany) and Hyper Force (Netherlands). In late 1998 the game was ported on the PlayStation by the studio Something Good as a Japan-only title, re-titled Curiosity kills the cat?.

Dog Day II was tentatively scheduled for release in the third quarter of 1999, but this never came to fruition.

== Plot and gameplay ==
The title plays as a 1st-person point and click adventure game. The narrative sees the player take the role of a dog (in a world where dogs are people). They are living under a corrupt regime caused by a dictator named Chegga. The player must find evidence of Chegga's crimes and sell it to a group called C.A.T.S. (Coalition Against Totalitarian Society), who will give him enough money to buy a train ticket to escape.

== Critical reception ==
Just Adventure praised the "great graphics, music, and wonderful puzzles", and noted its replay value. Hardcore Gaming praised the game's atmosphere and mise-en-scène. Tap Repeatedly wrote the game was visually impressive by 2003 standards. PC Joker felt the title embodied "solid mediocrity" and "all around average[ness]".
