= Wild West Alaska =

American reality television series

- Genre: Reality
- Country of origin: United States
- Original language: English
- No. of seasons: 4
- No. of episodes: 38

Production
- Running time: 42 minutes
- Production company: Jupiter Entertainment

Original release
- Network: Animal Planet
- Release: January 13, 2013 – February 10, 2016

Wild West Alaska is an American reality television series. The series premiered on January 13, 2013, on Animal Planet. The series is filmed in Anchorage, Alaska, where it chronicles the daily activities at the Wild West Guns gun shop.

== Series overview ==
| Season | Episodes | Originally released | |
| Season | Episodes | First released | Last released |
|---|---|---|---|
| 1 | 11 | January 13, 2013 | December 26, 2013 |
| 2 | 12 | January 2, 2014 | March 13, 2014 |
| 3 | 8 | January 8, 2015 | February 26, 2015 |
| 4 | 7 | January 6, 2016 | February 10, 2016 |

== Episodes ==
=== Season 1 (2013) ===
| No. overall | No. in season | Title | Original release date | US viewers (millions) |
|---|---|---|---|---|
| 1 | 1 | "The Kodiak Experience" | January 13, 2013 | N/A |
| 2 | 2 | "The Zombie Salmon" | January 20, 2013 | N/A |
| 3 | 3 | "The Great Alaskan Legend" | January 27, 2013 | N/A |
| 4 | 4 | "Bear Problems" | February 10, 2013 | N/A |
| 5 | 5 | "The Salmon Are Running and Hans Needs a Date" | February 17, 2013 | N/A |
| 6 | 6 | "The First Annual Beard and Mustache Competition" | February 24, 2013 | N/A |
| 7 | 7 | "Surf and Turf Wedding" | March 3, 2013 | N/A |
| 8 | 8 | "Fools Gold Fever" | March 10, 2013 | N/A |
| 9 | 9 | "The Wild West Gun" | March 17, 2013 | N/A |
| 10 | 10 | "Vegas Or Bust?" | March 24, 2013 | N/A |
| 11 | 11 | "A Wild West Christmas" | December 26, 2013 | N/A |

=== Season 2 (2014) ===
| No. overall | No. in season | Title | Original release date | US viewers (millions) |
|---|---|---|---|---|
| 12 | 1 | "What About Us?" | January 2, 2014 | N/A |
| 13 | 2 | "Special Delivery" | January 9, 2014 | N/A |
| 14 | 3 | "The Curse" | January 16, 2014 | N/A |
| 15 | 4 | "Let the Games Begin" | January 23, 2014 | N/A |
| 16 | 5 | "Grandma "Cowboys Up"" | January 30, 2014 | N/A |
| 17 | 6 | "Fishing for Gold" | February 6, 2014 | N/A |
| 18 | 7 | "Survival Challenge" | February 13, 2014 | N/A |
| 19 | 8 | "Hell on Wheels" | February 20, 2014 | N/A |
| 20 | 9 | "An American Hero" | February 27, 2014 | N/A |
| 21 | 10 | "Best Friends" | March 2, 2014 | N/A |
| 22 | 11 | "Music to Their Ears" | March 6, 2014 | N/A |
| 23 | 12 | "Will He Stay or Will He Go" | March 13, 2014 | N/A |

=== Season 3 (2015) ===
| No. overall | No. in season | Title | Original release date | US viewers (millions) |
|---|---|---|---|---|
| 24 | 1 | "Camo Mark Returns" | January 8, 2015 | N/A |
| 25 | 2 | "The Ghost of Hans" | January 15, 2015 | N/A |
| 26 | 3 | "Alaska True" | January 22, 2015 | N/A |
| 27 | 4 | "Guys VS Girls" | January 29, 2015 | N/A |
| 28 | 5 | "Smooth Criminal" | February 5, 2015 | N/A |
| 29 | 6 | "Midnight Madness" | February 12, 2015 | N/A |
| 30 | 7 | "The Ultimate Retreat" | February 26, 2015 | N/A |
| 31 | 8 | "Fathers and Sons" | February 26, 2015 | N/A |

=== Season 4 (2016) ===
| No. overall | No. in season | Title | Original release date | US viewers (millions) |
|---|---|---|---|---|
| 32 | 1 | "The Ultimate Scavenger Hunt" | January 6, 2016 | N/A |
| 33 | 2 | "Glacier Girls" | January 7, 2016 | 0.67 |
| 34 | 3 | "Kindness of Strangers" | January 14, 2016 | 0.61 |
| 35 | 4 | "Pony Express" | January 21, 2016 | 0.68 |
| 36 | 5 | "Pizza Madness" | January 28, 2016 | 0.61 |
| 37 | 6 | "Alaska Dreaming" | February 4, 2016 | 0.71 |
| 38 | 7 | "The New Girl" | February 11, 2016 | 0.62 |
