= List of veterinary medicine schools in Australia =

There are several Australian universities that offer entry-level veterinary medicine degrees.

== Table ==
Veterinary medicine schools in Australia
University	Locations	Entry level	Duration	Degrees
Charles Sturt University	Wagga Wagga	Undergraduate	6 years	BVetBio/BVetSci
James Cook University	Townsville	Undergraduate	5 years	BVetSci (Hons)
Murdoch University	Perth	Undergraduate	5 years	BSc/DVM
University of Adelaide	Adelaide	Undergraduate	6 years	BSc/DVM
University of Melbourne	Melbourne	Graduate	4 years	DVM
University of Queensland	Gatton	Undergraduate	5 years	BVetSci (Hons)
University of Sydney	Sydney	Undergraduate; Graduate	6 years 4 years	BVetBio/DVM; DVM
