= Chris Humfrey =

Australian zoologist and television personality

Chris Humfrey is an Australian zoologist and television personality. He appeared in the ABC3 documentary series Chris Humfrey's Wild Life (now on the Viasat Nature channel) and the Animal Planet series Chris Humfrey's Animal Instinct.

Humfrey also appeared as a reporter on Talk to the Animals.
