= Bad Dog! =

Animal Planet series of candid videos of pets misbehaving

Bad Dog! is an Animal Planet series that showcases viral caught on video moments of dogs behaving terribly and doing things they're not supposed to be doing. Bad Dog! started as a pilot episode on August 28, 2010 then it became a full series a year later in September 2011.

== History ==
Bad Dog! started as a television pilot episode on August 28, 2010. The show became a series in 2011 and aired on the Animal Planet channel. The press release called the show a, "...hilarious hour of television documenting just how far pets can push their owners and still get unconditional love." The show debuted in 2011 and the first episode was titled, Bad to the Bone.

== Episodes ==
Season	Episodes	Originally released	
Season	Episodes	First released	Last released
Pilot	1	August 28, 2010	
1	5	September 10, 2011	October 8, 2011
2	6	June 30, 2012	August 4, 2012
3	8	July 12, 2014	August 23, 2014

== Reception ==
In 2011 Ann Tatko-Peterson of The Mercury News said, "As guilty pleasures go, this one is a winner." Writing for The New York Times Neil Genzlinger stated, "The show presents assorted dogs that are expanding the boundaries of bad canine behavior, then does nothing to correct the beasts. Instead, it seems to revel in their wickedness."

== See also ==
- List of Animal Planet original programming
