= Housecat Housecall =

- Starring: Katrina Warren, D.V.M. (host); Stacy Fuchino, D.V.M. (season 1); Debra Horowitz, D.V.M. (season 1); Rich Goldstein, D.V.M. (season 2); Karen Sueda, D.V.M. (season 2); David Markus (narrator)
- Country of origin: United States
- No. of seasons: 3
- No. of episodes: 18

Production
- Running time: 30 minutes

Original release
- Network: Animal Planet
- Release: June 7, 2008 – July 10, 2010

Housecat Housecall is a weekly 30-minute television program that aired on Animal Planet in the United States and Australia. The show was broadcast from June 7, 2008 to July 10, 2010. It was hosted by veterinarian Katrina Warren.

== Format ==
In each episode, people emailed Dr. Warren videos about the problems they had with their cats. Dr. Warren then (in seasons 1 and 2) consulted her colleagues and devised a plan of action. She then visited the people with cat problems at their homes, met their cats, discussed the problems, and offered solutions. She came back a few days later and checked to see if her suggestions worked. Usually they did, and the problems were solved. The show also contained a segment called "Dr. Kat's Corner" in which she gave general cat care advice.

== Season 1 ==
Season 1 aired from Saturday, June 7 to Saturday, July 12, 2008. In season 1, Dr. Warren was joined by Dr. Stacy Fuchino and Dr. Debra Horwitz.

== Season 2 ==
Season 2 aired from Saturday, June 6 to Saturday, July 11, 2009. It featured two new colleagues, Dr. Karen Sueda and Dr. Rich Goldstein. Some celebrities also appeared. The premiere featured actor Peter Weller. Another episode had radio host Kerri Kasem. Musician David Benoit appeared in the season finale.

== Season 3 ==
Season 3 no longer had the mentors and aired from Saturday, June 5 to Saturday, July 10, 2010. This season's celebrity appearances included rapper Kurupt and his daughter, St. Louis Cardinals manager and Animal Rescue Foundation founder Tony La Russa, musician Michael Feinstein, and Carrie Ann Inaba of Dancing with the Stars fame.
