= Your Worst Animal Nightmares =

- Countries of origin: Australia; United States
- No. of seasons: 1
- No. of episodes: 12

Production
- Producer: John Stainton

Original release
- Network: The Discovery Channel
- Release: May 27 – June 24, 2009

Your Worst Animal Nightmares is a 2009 television series made by John Stainton broadcast by Animal Planet for The Discovery Channel. It is a docudrama with real events and stories of animal attack incidents re-enacted by actors, along with actual news footage of the events and some interviews. Most of the episodes are set in Australia, with one set in New Zealand.

== Episodes ==
Your Worst Animal Nightmares focuses on stories of 12 incidents, involving victims and survivors of the worst Australian animal attacks with 7 survival stories and 5 of them being fatal. Two episodes are aired together. Of the twelve episodes so far, five have been about crocodiles, four about sharks, two about snakes and one about spiders. Out of the incidents that have showcased Australian animal attacks, only dingoes and jellyfish are excluded, despite being included in the intro.

=== Episode 1 - Camp Terror: The Alicia Sorohan Story ===
Aired May 27, 2009

Subject: A grandmother, Alicia Sorohan tries to defend her family from a crocodile attack.

=== Episode 2 - Blood Bath: The Nick Peterson Story ===
Aired May 27, 2009

Subject: A group of teenagers get attacked by a great white shark. One of them, Nick Peterson is killed just as his father predicted in his nightmare.

=== Episode 3 - Bloody Monday: The Ken Crew story ===
Aired June 3, 2009

Subject: Another shark attack on an Australian beach. Ken Crew is fatally injured, while Dirk Avery survives.

=== Episode 4 - Trial by Venom: The Gordon Wheatley Story ===
Aired June 3, 2009

Subject: A spider bite by an Australian funnel-web spider on Gordon Wheatley, whose hope for survival is a newly developed antivenom which had not been tested on humans.

=== Episode 5 - Death Roll: The Val Plumwood Story ===
Aired June 10, 2009

Subject: Rowing on a river, Val Plumwood is attacked by a rogue crocodile in a canoe.

=== Episode 6 - Shark Bait: The Paul Morris story ===
Aired June 10, 2009

Subject: In New Zealand, Paul Morris survives being stalked by a great white shark. Initially traumatized by the experience, he earns help from shark attack survivor Rodney Fox in overcoming his fears.

=== Episode 7 - Perfect Prey: The Rodney Fox story ===
Aired June 17, 2009

Subject: The famous Rodney Fox bite, as a great white shark attacks during a spear fishing competition in the Neptune Islands.

=== Episode 8 - Horror Down Under: The Isabel Von Jordan Story ===
Aired June 17, 2009

Subject: An attack by a saltwater crocodile in an outback water hole, Sandy Billabong in Kakadu National Park in which the guide Glenn Robless leads a group of tourists, leading to one of them, Isabel Von Jordan getting killed during night swimming with her sister, Valerie.

=== Episode 9 - Mortal Coil: The Daniel Blair Story ===
Aired June 24, 2009

Subject: A surfer, Daniel Blair survives a snakebite by a death adder on the isolated Moreton Island in Australia, but is left traumatized by the event.

=== Episode 10 - Fatal Crossing: The Kerry Mcloughlin Story ===
Aired June 24, 2009

Subject: Fisherman Kerry Mcloughlin is decapitated in a fatal crocodile attack while crossing a river.

=== Episode 11 - Deadly Strike: The Ryan Cole Story ===
Subject: An Australian adolescent, Ryan Cole gets bitten by an eastern brown snake, the world's second most venomous snake, next to a river and faints in the water.

=== Episode 12 - Lethal Trap: The Ginger Meadows Story ===
Subject: Two women, Jane Burchett and Ginger Meadows are cornered next to a waterfall in the Prince Regent River, when Ginger tries to flee, she gets mutilated on the water by a saltwater crocodile.

== Reception ==
Common Sense Media rated the show 2 out of 5 stars.
