= Weird, True & Freaky =

- Genre: Documentary; Animals based on a game from tecmo
- Narrated by: Beau Weaver
- Country of origin: United States
- Original language: English
- No. of seasons: 3
- No. of episodes: 65

Production
- Executive producer: Michael Hoff
- Running time: 22 minutes
- Production company: Hoff Productions

Original release
- Network: Animal Planet
- Release: September 7, 2008 – November 23, 2010

Weird, True & Freaky (alternatively written as Weird, True and Freaky; Weird, True, and Freaky; or Weird, True, & Freaky) is a program that aired on Animal Planet in 2008 which focuses on unusual biology. Although some episodes center on unique animal behavior and traits, some focus on cryptids, animal-human relationships, experimental animals, humans who possess animal instincts, exotic breeds, surviving populations, etc. Weird, True & Freaky was produced by Hoff Productions.

== Episodes ==
=== Season 1 (2008) ===
- "Mutant Animals"
- "Animal Swingers"
- "Snake Meals"
- "Creepy Cuisines"
- "Humanimals"
- "When Animals Snap"
- "Peculiar Pets"
- "Dangerous Jobs"
- "Odd Couples"
- "Swarms"
- "Beast vs. Beast"
- "Animal Intruders"
- "Colossal Catches"
- "Animal Giants"
- "Creepy Cures"
- "Critter Creations"
- "Animal Cannibals"
- "Animal Obsessions"
- "Animal Rescues"
- "Invaders"
- "Creature Feats"
- "Mob Mentality"
- "Disgusting Jobs"
- "Snake Bites"
- "Bizarre Beasts and Beings"

=== Season 2 (2009) ===
- "Mutants 2"
- "Peculiar Pets 2"
- "Crazy Canine Companions"
- "Odd Couples"
- "Albinos"
- "Venom Cures"
- "Trapped"
- "Infestations"
- "Swallowed"
- "Caught on Tape 2"
- "Giants 2"
- "Removed From The Body"
- "Disturbing World Records"
- "Rituals"
- "Under The Influence"
- "Bizarre Births"
- "Dodging Death"
- "Lost And Found"
- "Restaurant Horror Stories"
- "Medical Mysteries"
- "Obese Beasts"
- "Hauntings"
- "Way Too Freaky"
- "Primates Gone Wild"
- "Fight Club"
- "Phobias"

=== Season 3 (2010) ===
- "Furless Freaks"
- "Color Freaks"
- "Mad Medicine"
- "Inked"
- "Don't Eat That"
- "Bizarre Looking Cats"
- "More Fat Animals"
- "They Should Be Dead"
- "Little Animals, Big World"
- "Smuggled and Seized"
- "Eternally Stuffed"
- "Nasty And On The Menu"
- "Alien Offspring"
- "the Toothless Clown"

== Reception ==
Common Sense Media rated it 2 out of 5 stars.

== See also ==
- List of programs broadcast by Animal Planet
