= Craig Busch =

New Zealand television personality

- Born: Craig Kevin Busch; 18 December 1964; Palmerston North, New Zealand
- Known for: The Lion Man

Craig Kevin Busch (born 18 December 1964) is a former New Zealand television personality. He was the founder of Zion Wildlife Gardens, the subject of the Discovery show The Lion Man. Zion Wildlife Gardens is now named Kamo Wildlife Sanctuary.

He now lives in South Africa where he runs Libran Wildlife Reserve, a Wildlife Rehabilitation Sanctuary facility specialising in Big Cats.

== Zion Wildlife Gardens ==
In 2005, Busch arranged the exchange of New Zealand's first natively born white tigers, from the Rhino and Lion Nature Reserve near Johannesburg.

In 2007, Busch was convicted in the Whangarei District Court of assaulting his former partner Karen Greybrook in 2005. Greybrook sustained a cut to her head, a fractured vertebra and bruising.

In November 2008, Busch was dismissed from Zion Wildlife Park. In the years that followed, Busch and his mother Patricia battled in court over ownership of the park and its assets. In August 2011, Busch attempted to have his mother adjudicated bankrupt over an alleged debt of $3800. In October, Busch withdrew the bankruptcy proceedings after a judge ordered Busch to pay $3800 as security costs for a hearing to proceed.

On 31 January 2012, Zion Wildlife Gardens was sold by receivers PricewaterhouseCoopers to Zion Wildlife Kingdom Limited. Busch also returned as a self-employed contractor, fulfilling a specialist animal handler role at the facility.

In April 2012, the park reopened under the name Kingdom of Zion.

In August 2013, Busch's former lawyer Wayne Peters again took action against his former client for unpaid legal fees. Presiding judge John McDonald ruled that Busch was required to pay the sum of $86,351.47 for the legal work carried out, as well as interest and costs.

From 2014 to 2015 Busch was the star of a reality TV series, The Lion Man: African Safari, on the Discovery Channel.

== Jabula Big Cat Sanctuary ==
Until 2021 Craig Busch ran a new park near Rustenburg in South Africa - the "Jabula Big Cat Sanctuary", a Wildlife Rehabilitation Sanctuary facility specialising in Big Cats.
