= Dog Days (American TV series) =

2002 American reality television series

Dog Days is an American reality television series which aired on Animal Planet in the fall of 2002. The show followed a number of New Yorkers, notably former Saturday Night Live choreographer Danielle Flora and top male model Edward Cruz, as they raised their pet dogs in New York City.

Dog Days aired eight episodes, and was not renewed for a second season. It was produced by Steven Rosenbaum and his New York production company CameraPlanet.
