= The Lion Man =

- Directed by: Reuben Pillsbury & AJ Johnson (Series 1-2); Craig Busch (Series 3-4)
- Starring: Craig Busch
- Narrated by: Paul Casserley (New Zealand); Miles Anderson (United Kingdom)
- Country of origin: New Zealand
- No. of series: 3
- No. of episodes: 47

Production
- Executive producers: Phillip Smith; Rachel Gardner; Craig Busch (Series 3-4)
- Running time: 30 minutes
- Production company: Great Southern Television

Original release
- Network: TVNZ
- Release: 17 June 2004 – 27 July 2008

The Lion Man is a New Zealand television documentary series about a New Zealand big cat park called Zion Wildlife Gardens. The series was named after Craig Busch, the park's founder, who had styled himself as "the Lion Man". The series followed Busch and the park's employees as they managed the park and its collection of approximately 30 lions and tigers of various species, and other animals. As well as first-hand comment from Busch and his staff, the series was narrated throughout by Paul Casserley in New Zealand and actor Miles Anderson in the United Kingdom.

The series also showed Busch during related promotional activities as well as his various wildlife missions abroad, including trips to Africa and Thailand. The Lion Man was one of New Zealand's most successful television series, showing in 93 countries worldwide, including Sky1 in the United Kingdom.

Three series were produced, the first of which began screening in New Zealand on 17 June 2004. The first two series were commissioned by state broadcaster TVNZ, but a third series looked in doubt following Busch's conviction in 2007 for assaulting his ex-wife at the park in 2005. Independent funding was found to produce the third series and TVNZ decided to broadcast it after determining that there was still popular demand for the show. The show was produced by Great Southern Television. All three series' music was composed by Peter Blake and the theme tune lyrics written by Bob Smith.

The show highlighted the activities of the park, including the birth of cubs from different species, and the filming of lions for television adverts and other promotions. As well as its visitor income and these promotions, the series itself became a source of vital funding for the park.

The Lion Man was broadcast in the United Kingdom on Sky3 (now Pick) but no longer does.

== Episodes ==
=== Series One ===
Series One aired in 2004.

Ep No.	Description
1	In Whangarei, Northland, we meet New Zealand's 'Lion man', Craig Busch, a self-taught cat 'trainer'. He runs the Zion Wildlife Gardens with his partner Karen. The large safari park-type private zoo is devoted to wild felines, with twelve lions and six tigers, notably the nearly extinct Barbary lions (North African), starring male zoo mascot Zion, and five white Bengal tigers. His dream is to add the rare African white lion to this collection. Other species include serval cats, deer and a rascal baboon, Foxy. Today is memorable: the first new Zealand birth of a Bengal cub; he's ten days early, but Craig manages to get mother Shikana (both have orange fur, but carry white genes) to suckle.
2	The one year young park has two resident builders, Tony 'Shrek' Organ and John 'Moses' Davis, who work on the permanent facilities, sometimes with external contractors. They must trust Craig to prevent them ending up as cat food. Tiger mother Shikana did well, despite the stress caused by neighbouring males as the early birth prevented moving away, but at night accidentally crushed the cub fatally.
3	Unlike mascot Zion and his mate, Samson's pride is rather wild and rowdy. Two cubs, Aslan and sister Narnia, have so far lived alone, but are now exposed to their notoriously mischievous big sister Savannah. Now tigress Shikana has recovered from losing her cub, she's introduced to Tygo, a white Bengal male, given her genes a one out of five chance of adding to the world's population of white tigers. Eight weeks later, resident vet Didier Poot, who brings his little son Matthieu, confirms she's already lactating. Resident artist Gordon Howard helps with feeding time. Moses and Shrek continue work on the birthing den. Craig and Shrek walk Shikana on a leash.
4	Craig, training lion mascot Zion for acting in a commercial, makes unique lunch entertainment. Bengal tigress Shikana has another orange cub, more relaxed now the birthing den was ready. Sampson defends his siring privilege in the pride's cage. Savannah is toppled by Narnia in the lion trio enclosure. Aslan gets his first walk on a leash.
5	Craig finally gets an opportunity to legally bid on a white lion cub in South Africa, but must leave in two weeks. Meanwhile, tigress Shikana has grown so protective of her cub Sita that only he can still approach her, and bonding early is crucial for her training later. The father, white tiger Tygo, also needs his and vet Didier's attention. The lion cubs come along on a beach walk.
6	On his expedition to acquire Gandor, a 3-4months old white lion cub, Craig visits the Lion and Rhino Park, near Johannesburg. An, exchange for a white tiger appeals to both zoos chiefs. Craig finds the park well run, Gandor in perfect condition and good-natured.
7	Craig's cats are quite happy in their daily routine back home, the high-points including feeds. Meanwhile, Craig's South African tour continues at White River Cheetah and Rhino Park, where he makes contacts to get involved in breeding the fastest, perfectly adapted feline.
8	On his South African trip, Craig visits Timbavati park, where ranger Dave's team show him the natural habitat of the African white lions, amidst elephants, rhinos and other wildlife. He proves himself more knowledgeable than the traditionally reputed 'lion queen' dynasty, an able tracker and animal handler and even the tribal rangers.
9	Just back from South Africa, Craig bonds again with his 'cats', though Zion is Grumpy having missed his 'dad'. he hopes Abu and Rewa will mate and produce a white tiger cub he can exchange with Ed Hern for a white lion. Since this reality show is on TV, all Whangarei is proud of 'their' rather shy Craig, who returns from his rare night out to check up on tiger Abu's stomach trouble. The park gets ever more visitors, today New Zealand Idol stars Ben and Michael, but will have to close for three months to complete extension phase two.
10	This season finale recapitulates how Craig and his small staff started his New Zealand endangered big cats park. It overviews how the various felines -lions and Bengal tigers- fared, individually and/or as enclosure companions. Special stars are the tigress new mother Shikana and Craig's mascot actor, lion Zion. Finally there's the breeding program, and Craig's South African trip to arrange swapping white lion cub Gandor his next white tiger cub.

=== Series Two ===
Series Two aired in 2005.

Ep No.	Description
1	Mainly using flash-backs to season 1, this opening episode sketches Craig's life, making the boyish dreams come true to live with big cats. After spending time in the US, Craig then became a self-made Hollywood animal handler and moved back to northern New Zealand and started the Zion park - now an expert trainer to acting standard. We recapitulate its building, the feline cats and their stories, and the breeding program, which includes exchanges four white lions from South Africa for four white Bengals tiger cubs.
2	A recapitulation of Craig's successfully trip to Africa in season 1, when he saw the African fauna in the wild, especially the felines, and arranged for the exchange of white lions for white tigers. Indeed, instead of one, two cubs were exchanged. Some extra footage, and the sequel: how white lion cub Gandor and female lion cub Shakira passed quarantine and got welcomed and integrated into Zion Park.
3	This episode, again remixing much footage from season one, focuses on breeding, notably tiger cubs, also crucial as exchange for the South African white lion cubs. Both orange Bengal tigress Shikana and white tigress Rewa deliver. Craig manages to get close before, during and after birth, even after taking the previous cubs away temporarily so he can bond as surrogate parent for their training future. Shikana is now a perfect mother for Indira and Khali, but Rewa ignores her two.
4	This episode, again reusing some footage from season one, focuses first on Craig's cat training for commercials and even a motion picture with lions Zion and Aslan and white tiger Abu. Next it deals with his growing popularity and various more educational jobs, such as visiting schools. Finally their appearances in TV programs and receiving celebrities to Zion Park.
5	The story of Gandor, the first white lion in New Zealand, with flash-backs to Craig's successful South African trips to negotiate viz. actually effectuate the trade of spontaneous white lion blood -invaluable to counter inbreeding- for a white tiger cub, (two as young lioness Shikira is thrown into the bargain). After leash training, blood tests and four months quarantine, Gandor arrives in Zion park and gets acquainted with staff and fellow felines. Meanwhile, Shikana's first surviving cub Sita proves a real handful.
6	After six months the lion cubs finally arrive in New Zealand. Craig gets them through customs for a last month of quarantine, now inside Zion Park, where the new cat quarters are nearing completion, albeit behind schedule. Craig further concentrates on the new pregnancy of Shikana, which is confirmed by vet Poot.
7	The Zion Wildlife Gardens staff bets on the date of Shikana's latest births. Water-loving tigers get a hosing-down to cool down but only young Sita isn't quite into getting wet yet. Soon their new permanent troughs are installed and happily baptized. The birth barn takes extra effort to be ready just in time for Shikana's double delivery. Meanwhile, Zion stars in a TV commercial shoot. Both tiger cubs are healthy females, but neither is white.
8	Craig's next hope for a white cub, Rewa, gets pregnant, only not monogamously with the planned father Abu. He in turn wounds rival Jadhu, a stitching job for vet Didier, who brings his two young sons along. Craig visits a fellow trainer, who specializes in halfbreed wolves, on an Auckland film set.
9	Craig prepares to take the two orange tiger cubs Indira and Kahli away from their Bengal mother, Shikana, so he can forge a 'parental' bond by hand-feeding them. Craig and young male lion Aslan are hired for a 19th-century lion-taming British commercial. Back home, Shikana and Sita are reunited, softening the loss of the young cubs, and moved back into their den.
10	Craig trains Aslan and Narnia to walk on a leash, helped by Gavin because at two the lions are just too strong for the girls. Even Craig has a hard time making the white tiger, Abu, pose for photographer Johnno, his team and young son for a Ceylon tea campaign, as the equipment inspires suspicion. External vet Hugh Black's final inspection gives lions Gandor and Shikira the go-ahead to leave quarantine.
11	Craig shows that even a lion Aslan's size goes easily into the office on a leash with him, although a stuffed tiger gets it before he's reunited with his sisters. The tiger cubs show their playful and rebellious sides during leash training, but also have diet and medical troubles.
12	Craig demonstrates how much harder reluctant white lion Gandor is to handle on a leash than eager Shakira. Rewa's pregnancy is confirmed. With his help, and at great danger, she delivers two white tiger cubs, the first ever in New Zealand - these cubs promised in return for obtaining the South African lions. Rewa refuses to mother them, so Craig starts bottle-feeding etc. right away.
13	Craig must concentrate on both pairs of tiger cubs, and training two assistants before he leaves on a Thailand trip in two weeks. Meanwhile, the 'wild' lion pride is in 'civil war' as leader Samson's throne is challenged by younger male Shumba. To separate them, work on the new enclosures is hastened.
14	Craig visits a Buddhist tiger temple outside the Thai capital Bangkok. The abbot presides over a tiger sanctuary that is both cat and tourist-friendly, and is earning its own keep. British volunteer Colin Dickens doesn't mind the rough play by the big cats although he's repeatedly clawed and bitten 'playfully', he still has scars on legs and bottom.
15	Craig's Thai trip continues north, to Lampang conservation centre. There Asian elephants and mahouts, their life-time handlers, are trained. The elephants serve mainly the tourism industry and are for hire to ceremonies as logging was banned to save the dwindling rain-forest. Craig proves a talented handler. Back home, Craig's friend Nick takes care of the park's cats.
16	Craig's next Thai destination is a zoo where two people from the UK breed the rare clouded leopard. Then it's off to an elephant hospital, where abused animals get treatment. After ten days Craig returns home, happily reunited with mascot Zion and his other cats.
17	This season finale comprises flash-backs to favourite fragments from the second season. This includes the arrival of Craig and New Zealand's first white lion cub Gandor and tawny lioness Shakira. Other obvious favourites were Bengal tigress Shikana's latest cubs, Indira and Kahli, and two more for exchanges. Also clips of leash-training, the park extension works and the Thailand trip.

=== Series Three ===
Series Three aired in 2007.

Ep No.	Description
1	Zion Gardens now has 43 big cats. Craig prepares to personally deliver white Bengal tiger cubs Rongo and Kiwi to Ed Hern's in South Africa. They are the promised counterpart for white - and tawny lion cubs Gandor and Shikira, now adults at Zion.
2	Craig helps White Lion Imvula with the first white lion births in New Zealand. Two healthy males are born; Timba and Themba. White Tiger cub Khan has surgery for a hernia, which ends well despite sedation trouble. Meanwhile, the adult white lions pride must be protected against intrusion by the wild lions, so a concrete rim is built, preventing any passage digging.
3	Thanks to Craig's assistance, even lion Shikira's dentist appointment goes easily. The various cubs are settling into their routine, which is new for Kahn, but he soon finds his place. Meanwhile, rivalries and character differences complicate life for the park staff.
4	Craig is surprised when white tigress Rewa gives birth sooner than expected, and has three healthy cubs; Anila, Kala and Azra, which she starts caring for well. Heavy rains test the drainage system to the limit and cause a mess which staff must frantically remove. The cats get listless and Rewa rejects her litter like the previous one, so they get fed by zoo staff. While dragging a big branch into a tigers cage for enrichment, Craig falls and Kahli's natural instincts come out, Craig takes control of the situation and regain control.
5	Craig continues 'socializing' his big cats. Next several of the playful white youngsters are to 'perform' at a pet shop's grand opening, demonstrating the remarkable results of Craig's pseudo-parental touch. Despite all efforts, such as hand-feeding, tensions and rivalries still cause many problems and worries.
6	In order to stop the physically dangerous rivalry between old and new lion kings Zion and Gandor, Craig's team builds a new enclosure, within one day. Meanwhile, there is tiger (cub) feeding, socializing youngsters with people and their dad as well as leashed-walk-training go on.
7	Craig delighted to discover a young adult white lioness, which he just gave a separate enclosure with a known father, just give birth, unexpectedly early, to three cubs already. A fourth follows while he keeps a watchful eye, needed as she lacks maternal routine. The nursery duties are accordingly increased. Craig still finds time to go fishing for his cats menu variation, but their appreciation is most disappointing. Meanwhile, tiger cubs get their infancy shots.
8	Craig has to help vet Brett treat a tiger's tooth ache, a very delicate balance exercise between medical animal welfare and safety-vital confidence-grudge-accounting. The young white tigress mother has such a bad maternal instinct that Craig has to transfer the cubs to human substitute mothering and even supervises personally her return to the pride where another mother has somewhat older cubs. Bengal tigress Kali demonstrates to visitors what amazing socializing results Craig's method can achieve, yet never without residual risk.
9	Sadly, vet Brett can't cure tiger cub Khan's congenital problems, so the decision is made to euthanize Kahn. Khali is the star of Craig's fund-raising show, which has to be prepared for on schedule.
10	Craig takes a selection of tigers, lions and cubs to the largest show on Southland, a major chunk in Zion's annual budget. It requires elaborate preparation, before, during and after the trip. Despite some surprises and an uncharacteristically moody Kahli, everything works out well. This season finale also includes a series of flash-backs.
1	In this season premiere, a fairly quiet day in Craig's life allows the viewers to catch up with the present state of affairs in Zion Wildlife park. He, staff and visitors enjoy the adult and cub tigers and lions. After hours, Craig worries about the lion pride social dynamics. He hoped to diverts the adolescent lions with a novelty woodland walk. A refrigeration problem with the meat supply looks to be a costly mishap.
2	Craig travels to Ed Hearn's wild park in South Africa to pick up two cheetah cubs. First he visits the two tiger cubs he traded with Ed on his last visit. Next he joins a trip hoping to see white lion cubs in the wild.
3	On his South African trip to collect two cheetah cubs, Craig joins a trip to search for wild lions, which brings him dangerously close to elephants, the largest land animals. Back in Zion Park, Gandor's broken tooth is an even harder problem in Craig's absence.
4	While his South African cheetah cubs are in quarantine, Craig comes home take stock of things back in Zion Gardens. Grooming the cubs, dirty from out- and indoors frolicking, comes on top of the staff's daily chores, such as leash training and socialization.
5	Craig is back in South Africa, where both 'his' cheetah cubs remain in prolonged quarantine, being diagnosed with a parasite and a respiratory infection. Craig helps the vet nurse them, but one dies and the other is declared incurable, so neither can come to New Zealand. His only hope now are two 'spare' cubs' Ed Hearn has also quarantined, but those are older, wilder.
6	While he waits for the next cheetah cubs' quarantine, Craig is back. After greeting his cats, he must concentrate on helping the vet's crew sedate an old lion so the dentist can operate his badly infected tooth. Meanwhile, some enterprising lion cubs not only prove hard to leash-train, they keep escaping, so Moses must improvise a higher enclosure.
7	Craig is back in South Africa to collect Ed Hearns's semi-wild pair of 'spare' cheetah cubs. First he visits two white tigers he bred and gives the South African staff pointers how to handle them during a visit to the whole park with them. After the Cheetah cubs get a clean bill of health, Craig takes the time to exchange expertise with a TV commercial shoot team starring a lioness. After some customs paperwork, the cheetahs are tranquilized and fly to New Zealand, where they start another quarantine month.
8	The cheetahs have arrived in Zion park, but running champions need space, meaning the large enclosure Zion's pride of lazy lions never really uses. So those are moved to a temporary one. It's a lot of hasty work, but even moving the lions goes well. A ministry vet finds all quarantine rules met, so the cheetahs can be moved.
9	The cheetahs are slowly getting used to Zion park's daily routine, such as feeding. Craig also receives new deer and the vet injects them preventively. Mozes continues building extra enclosures, but some cubs find their own playful use for his tool belt. An Australian make-A-Wish minor gets an exceptional tour behind the screens.
10	Most of this season final is taken up by recapitulating the main story, Craig's South African trips to get Zion's two first-ever cheetah cubs. Furthermore, we see some funny scenes concerning socializing cubs.

=== Animals ===
These are the animals that were at the park at some point while filming was taking place. Most appeared in the series.

==== Lions ====
- Zion
- Shia
- Shikira
- Sampson
- Shania
- Abdullah
- Cleo
- Tshaka
- Aslan
- Cora
- Jabu
- Narnia
- Tanza
- Savannah
- Shumba
- Zamba

==== White Lions ====
- Gandor
- Laduma
- Amafu
- Imvula
- Marah
- Moya
- Sabie
- Sibili
- Timba
- Themba

==== Orange Tigers ====
- Shikana
- Sita
- Indira
- Kahli

==== White Tigers ====
- Abu
- Jahdu
- Rewa
- Tygo
- Azra
- Anila
- Kala
- Shanti
- Rongo
- Kiwi
- Khan
- Aotea
- Tane

==== Other ====
- Foxy - Baboon
- Mandla - Black Leopard
- Zoe - Serval
- Silas - Serval
- Kenya - Cheetah
- Thabo - Cheetah
