= Curiosity killed the cat =

Proverb

"Curiosity killed the cat" is a proverb used to warn of the dangers of unnecessary investigation or experimentation. The original form of the proverb, now rarely used, was "care killed the cat". The modern version dates from at least the 19th century.

== Origin ==
The earliest printed reference to the original proverb appears in the 1598 play, Every Man in His Humour, written by the English playwright Ben Jonson:

Helter skelter, hang sorrow, care'll kill a cat, up-tails all, and a louse for the hangman.

In this context, "care" refers to worry, or sorrow for others.

The play was first performed by Shakespeare's playing company, the Lord Chamberlain's Men. Shakespeare used a similar quote in his circa 1599 play, Much Ado About Nothing:

What, courage man! what though care killed a cat, thou hast mettle enough in thee to kill care.

The proverb remained the same until at least 1898. Ebenezer Cobham Brewer included this definition in his Dictionary of Phrase and Fable:

Care killed the Cat.
It is said that "a cat has nine lives," yet care would wear them all out.

== Transformation ==
The origin of the modern variation is unknown. It is found in an Irish newspaper from 1868: "They say curiosity killed a cat once." An early printed reference to the actual phrase "Curiosity killed the cat" is in James Allan Mair's 1873 compendium A handbook of proverbs: English, Scottish, Irish, American, Shakesperean, and scriptural; and family mottoes, where it is listed as an Irish proverb on page 34. In the 1902 edition of Proverbs: Maxims and Phrases, by John Hendricks Bechtel, the phrase "Curiosity killed the cat" is the lone entry under the topic "Curiosity" on page 100.

O. Henry's 1909 short story "Schools and Schools" includes a mention that suggests knowledge of the proverb had become widespread by that time:

Curiosity can do more things than kill a cat; and if emotions, well recognized as feminine, are inimical to feline life, then jealousy would soon leave the whole world catless.

The phrase itself was the headline of a story in The Washington Post in 1916 about a cat who had climbed the flue of a chimney, and died after falling down to a lower floor.

Despite these earlier appearances, the proverb has been wrongly attributed to Eugene O'Neill, who included the variation, "Curiosity killed a cat!" in his play Diff'rent from 1920:

BENNY—(with a wink) Curiosity killed a cat! Ask me no questions and I'll tell you no lies.

== Variations ==
=== "…but satisfaction brought it back" ===
A variation of the idiom is followed by the rejoinder "but satisfaction brought it back".

On 10 August 1905, The Galveston Daily News newspaper printed the following quotation without the word satisfaction:

Curiosity killed a cat; but it came back.

On 14 April 1909, The Waxahachie Daily Light newspaper printed the following quote with the word frought instead of brought:

"Curiosity killed a cat,
Satisfaction brought it back,
It is almost time to stand in line,
Ahen when your turn comes
To take your whack."

On 23 December 1912, a printed reference to this variation of the proverb is found in The Titusville Herald newspaper:

You will find greater values here. We are told:
"Curiosity killed the cat,
But satisfaction brought it back."
It is the same story with groceries.
"Prices will sell Groceries, but it is always finality that brings the buyer back."

The proverb appears to have become well known soon after, as these quotes indicate.

The Harrisburg Patriot newspaper, 26 March 1917:

Curiosity killed a cat, But satisfaction brought it back

The Jewell Record newspaper, 15 May 1924:

Come May 19th and 21st and see this puzzle completed. As the saying goes "Curiosity killed a cat, satisfaction brought it back."

=== Modern usage ===
Stephen King's 1977 horror novel, The Shining, includes the following lines:

Curiosity killed the cat, my dear redrum. Redrum my dear, satisfaction brought him back.

The album New Values (1979) by Iggy Pop contains the song "Curiosity" written by Iggy Pop and Scott Thurston. The song includes the following line:

Curiosity killed the cat but what it found brought it back.
