= Katrina Warren =

Australian television veterinarian

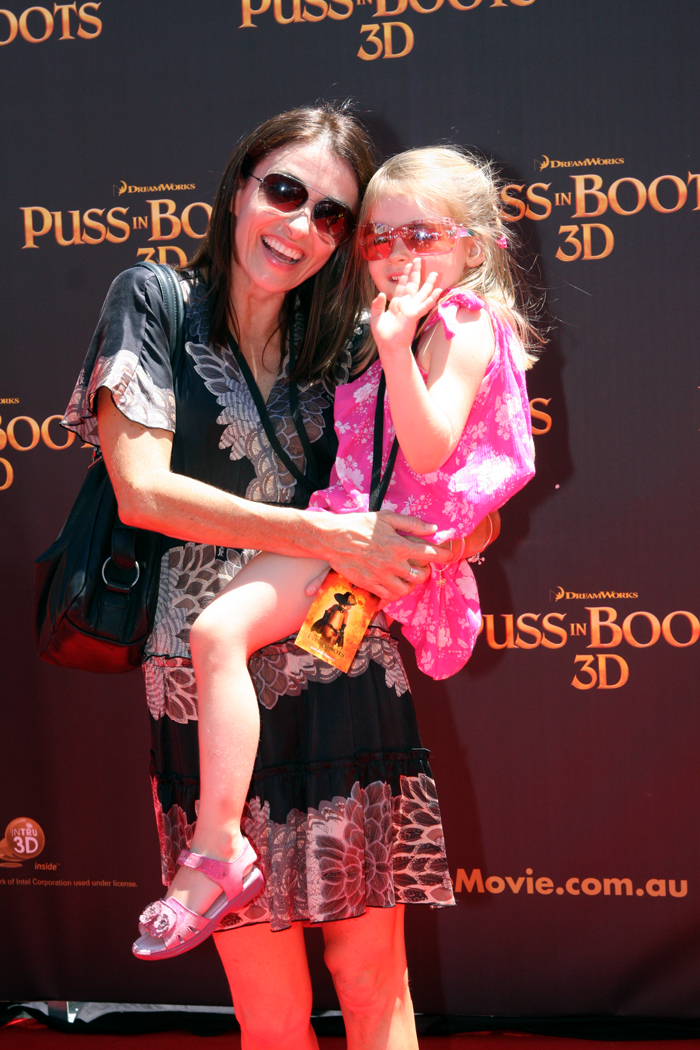
- Katrina Warren (left) at the Puss in Boots Australian premiere, in November 2011
- Born: Katrina Louise Warren; 8 December 1967 (age 58); Sydney, New South Wales
- Occupations: Veterinarian and TV presenter
- Years active: 1994–present
- Children: 1
- Website: http://www.drkatrina.com.au

Dr Katrina Louise Warren (born 8 December 1967) is an Australian veterinarian, best known as the co-host of several popular television programs on the Seven Network.

== Career ==
After working as a fashion model in Japan, Warren first appeared on television screens in the Ten Network's children's program Totally Wild in 1994.

Warren is best known for her appearances from 1997 on the Seven Network family show Harry's Practice as a resident vet. She was the star of Beverly Hills Vet a show produced by Animal Planet in 2003. She also appeared in 2004 as a contestant on Australia's Dancing with the Stars. Warren also presented on the Channel Seven lifestyle show Melbourne Weekender with Jo Silvagni.

From 2008 to 2010, Warren worked as a host of the TV Show Housecat Housecall on Animal Planet in the US.

== Personal life ==
In 2007 Warren gave birth to her daughter Charlotte Darcy. Warren and her husband Anthony Darcy separated 15 months later. Warren lives in Sydney.
