= Grizzy & the Lemmings =

French animated television series

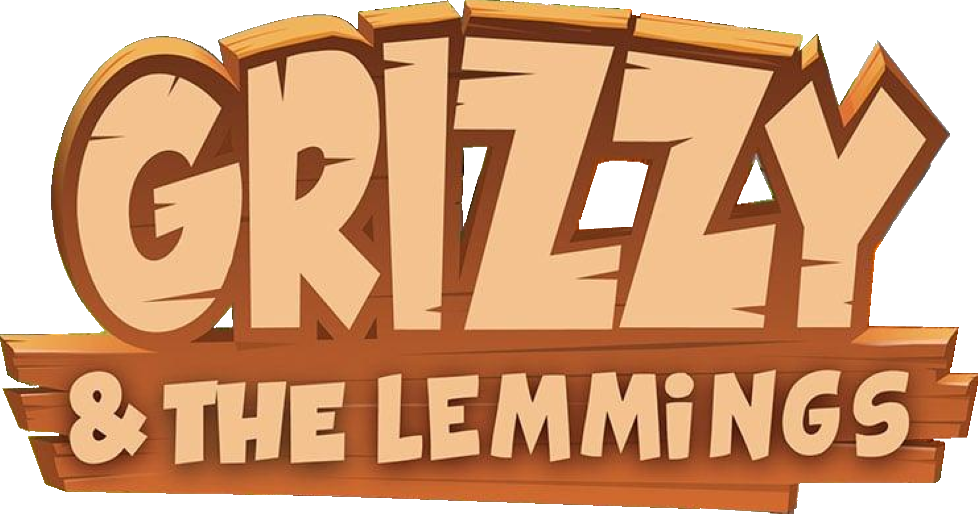
- Also known as: Grizzy & the Lemmings: World Tour (seasons 3–4); Grizzy & the Lemmings: Time Travel (seasons 5–6)
- Original title: Grizzy et les Lemmings
- Genre: Comedy; Slapstick
- Created by: Antoine Rodelet; Josselin Charier
- Directed by: Victor Moulin (seasons 1–3)
- Voices of: Josselin Charier; Pierre-Alain de Garrigues
- Composer: The Sonor Brothers
- Country of origin: France
- Original language: None
- No. of seasons: 4
- No. of episodes: 104 (312 segments) (list of episodes)

Production
- Producers: Antoine Rodelet; Josselin Charier
- Running time: 21 minutes (7 minutes per segment)
- Production company: Studio Hari

Original release
- Network: France 3 Boomerang
- Release: 10 October 2016 – present

Grizzy & the Lemmings (French: Grizzy et les Lemmings) (French pronunciation: [ɡʁi.zi e lɛ lɛ.mɪŋ]) is a French animated children's comedy television series produced by Studio Hari with the participation of France Télévisions and Boomerang. It is a silent comedy focusing on a food-loving, homebody brown grizzly bear named Grizzy, whose life is constantly interrupted by a band of adrenaline junkie bluish-gray lemmings, who constantly irritate each other. The show has no real dialogue, as characters speak gibberish. The three-dimensional designs are by Bertrand Gatignol for the characters and Édouard Cellura for the sets.

The series was announced on 22 June 2015, and debuted internationally in the fall of 2016. It was renewed for a second season on 5 July 2017, which was stated to air on a number of channels around the globe in 2018. Season 1 was released for Netflix on 15 July 2019.

In the same year, Hari Productions (Studio Hari) announced the development of the third season, titled Grizzy & the Lemmings: World Tour. Season 3 came out in 2021 and ended on 15 March 2022. Season 4 came out on May 15, 2024 and ended on January 28, 2025. This season, alongside the fourth, is dubbed World Tour. Seasons 3 and 4 take Grizzy and the Lemmings to the Great Wall of China; a tropical island in the Pacific Ocean; snowy Antarctica; the African desert; the highlands of Scotland; a rainforest jungle; and Asia respectively.

Seasons 5 and 6 have both been greenlit and will air in 2027 and 2029 respectively, both centred around a "time travel" theme which will take them to the Jurassic era, Ancient Egypt, Ancient Greece, Ancient China, Renaissance Italy and the Wild West respectively. A feature-length film based on the series is currently in development, and the script and visual development have been completed by Studio HARI.

== Synopsis ==
Grizzy & the Lemmings is set in Nutty Hill, a fictional park in Canada, at the hillside cabin of the park's mostly unseen forest ranger. The national park is primarily inhabited by various forest animals. When the ranger leaves for work each day, Grizzy, a grizzly bear, slips into the cabin and takes advantage of its numerous amenities, usually seeking to relax, watch television and snack. Unfortunately, he shares his house with a pack of rambunctious and mischief-making blue-gray lemmings that always disturb his peace, who all have similar personalities.

As Grizzy and the Lemmings are drawn into conflict, various pieces of high-tech equipment and sometimes magic objects in and around the cabin come into play, as the lemmings seek to make more mischief and Grizzy tries to stop them. The battle invariably spills onto the passing highway, leading to high-speed chases in almost every episode. Almost every episode (aside from "Cabin, My Love") ends in a comically bad ending for both sides as Grizzy and the Lemmings would be trapped in some sort of undesirable and apparently inescapable situation.

== Episodes ==
| Season | Segments | Episodes | Originally released | | |
| Season | Segments | Episodes | First released | Last released | Network |
|---|---|---|---|---|---|
| 1 | 78 | 26 | October 10, 2016 | November 17, 2017 | France 3 Cartoon Network; Boomerang; Netflix; Pop |
| 2 | 78 | 26 | September 2, 2018 | May 24, 2019 | France 3 Cartoon Network; Boomerang; Netflix; Pop |
| Shorts | | | September 4, 2019 | March 27, 2020 | Official website YouTube channel |
| 3 | 78 | 26 | September 21, 2021 | March 15, 2022 | France 4 Cartoon Network; Boomerang; Okoo; Netflix; CBBC |
| 4 | 78 | 26 | May 15, 2024 | January 28, 2025 | France 4 Cartoon Network; Boomerang; Okoo; Netflix; CBBC |

== Characters ==
=== Main ===
- Grizzy (voiced by Pierre-Alain de Garrigues) – The titular co-protagonist of the series, a grizzly bear who lives in the Forest Ranger's cabin. He has a brown body, a light brown fat stomach, and a height of approximately two meters (6 feet 7 inches) tall. He wears a green-colored locket and a pair of sandals, which belonged to the Forest Ranger. In the cabin, he does not do anything except sleeping on the sofa, watch TV and eat salmon covered with a spread of Yummy XL (chocolate spread, moreover an off brand recreation of Nutella). He likes watching a TV program entitled "The Secret of the Salmon". He dislikes opera music, which sometimes starts when he is switching channels. The only thing that stands in his way of luxury is the Lemmings, who cause him a lot of trouble and mischief. Grizzy does not like them and doesn't like to share anything with them. In the episode "Intensive Care", it is shown that when the Lemmings get sick, he develops some sympathy for them. He does not say anything meaningful, but he is seen reading English from a mobile phone screen. Grizzy is actually very smart, able to find a solution to any situation.
- The Lemmings (voiced by Josselin Charier, the founder of Hari Productions) – The titular co-protagonists of the series, a group of dozen of lemmings with blue bodies and light bluish-gray stomachs, also inhabiting the Forest Ranger's cabin. All of them have the same appearance, behaviors, mannerisms, and interests. They speak in a language which only consists of the word "Tabodi". Said to be a tribe of forty, the Lemmings' single motivation of fun gets them into trouble with Grizzy, whom does not like or support the lemmings in any way. Despite their intelligence, their personality is that of dim-witted teenage pranksters, but they appear to work very well as a team, which can make the bear's life in the cabin quite difficult. They love having rave parties and they also eat Yummy XL like Grizzy, stealing his jars at every opportunity. They love watching a TV program about a cat and a mouse (a parody of Tom and Jerry). They can sing lullabies that make Grizzy fall asleep. They also love dancing to music, which he dislikes. They also don't like to share anything with him. They cause a lot of chaos, with most of their mischief being targeted at Grizzy. Like Grizzy, they love technology, such as 3D printers, mobile phones, radio speakers, and, in case of avoiding being chased by Grizzy, use blow-dryers or fans to make their skateboard go faster.

=== Major ===
- She-Bear – She is a female grizzly bear who is Grizzy's love interest. Unfortunately for Grizzy, she shares no interest in him and his attempts to impress her end in failure, either caused by him or by the Lemmings. The She-Bear has an interest in the natural wildlife, but on some occasions in the episodes she takes part in the crazy antics between Grizzy and the Lemmings. Her color and height are the same as Grizzy but she is slimmer and has a heart-shaped spot on her belly. In season 2, she received a redesign, giving her a huge pink spot (like Grizzy's) on her belly, instead of the former heart-shaped spot. She always has a flower accessorized in her hair. She lives in the forest and loves sniffing flowers, watching butterflies and kites. She sleeps at night on a log of wood in the forest. She also likes popcorn. It's revealed in the episode "Babysitting", where she has a bear cub daughter "She-Bear Kid". She-Bear has featured a larger role with main characters in the episode "Mind in a Whirl".
- Other creatures – There are also some other animals, birds and insects in the forest. And they don't do anything like the three of them and live in the forest like real and simple animals. Both Grizzy and the Lemmings tend to use these animals for their own schemes, but usually, by the end of every episode, both of them suffer from the hilarious consequences of their actions. Sometimes other living organisms also get caught up in these troubles.
  - Moose – Many moose appear in episodes of the show. The Lemmings (and sometimes Grizzy) use them for transportation. The moose are fond of eating carrots, so sometimes the Lemmings hang a carrot in front of their eyes to make them run. They can eat other things like glass bottles or a ring, as shown in "Bear Luck" and "Clean Bear". They are incredibly passive and don't do anything apart from graze. The color of nearly all of the moose is mostly brown, but a black-colored moose is shown in the episodes "A Midsummer Bear's Dream" and "Wandering Spirits". A moose is featured in a larger role with Grizzy and Lemmings in the episode "Rainbow Moose".
  - Partridge/Ruffed grouse – These mountain bamboo partridge birds are often used as a mode of transport by the Lemmings. Grizzy also uses them in many situations. They have big eyes and the color of their feathers are brown and black. Sometimes a partridge becomes bigger in size due to the actions and consequences of Grizzy and the Lemmings. A giant partridge is shown in the episodes "A Midsummer's Bear dream", "Timeless Bear" and "The Bear Next Door" (not in the main background but in another place). In the show, the partridges fly in the sky. They are largely featured with Grizzy and the lemmings in the episodes "A Sizeable Problem" and "Call of the Bear".

=== Minor ===
- Frog – Frogs are generally shown eating flies. In the show the tongues of the frogs are long. Frogs are featured mainly with the main characters in the episode "Bear Charm".
- Fly – Flies are generally shown being eaten by frogs. Sometimes, flies are a victim to various chemical potions brewed by Grizzy. A fly has mainly shown with the main characters in the episode "Yummy Fly".
- Butterfly – Butterflies are generally seen in blue, pink or yellow colors. The She-Bear loves them. Butterflies are usually small in size but a big butterfly is shown in episodes "Timeless Bear", "The Bear Next Door" and "The Bear and the Butterfly" (in this episode, the butterfly has a larger role with the main characters).
- Raccoon – The raccoons are dirty and often rummage in the trash and eat garbage. Their noses twitch very fast. The lullaby of lemmings also makes them go to sleep as shown in the episode "Inspector Grizzy". A raccoon has been featured in a large role with the main cast in the episodes "Bear's Best Friend", "Sniffer Raccoon" and "Masked Raccoon".
- Spider – Spiders are rarely seen. Their color is mainly black. Grizzy has a fear of spiders, shown in the episode "Spider Lemmings".
- Dinosaur – A T. rex-like dinosaur(s) is unfrozen from a block of ice in "Jurassic Bear" (red and green in color) and also appears in episodes "Timeless Bear", "The Bear Next Door" (in lime-green color), "Ancestral Bear" and "Surprise Deglaciation".
- Bat – Bats (appears in season 2) are also rarely seen. Bats have a larger role with Grizzy and Lemmings in the episode "BatGrizzy" (in this episode, it is shown that they do not like anyone controlling them for their own means).
- Polar Bear – A polar bear appears in the episode "Ice and Bears". He quickly overheats without ice and behaves like a playful dog when cooled, becoming a pal to the Lemmings and a perplexing annoyance to Grizzy.
- Forest Ranger – The Forest Ranger very rarely appears in person. His only appearance in the show is in the intro and in the episode "As Far As Bear Can Remember" in a flashback. He is shown as a man who left his cabin in the forest where Grizzy and the Lemmings now live. In some episodes, his poster and photos are shown. He is the only human character in the show. He seems unaware that animals are roaming his workplace, because none of the episodes are taken to remove them.

=== World Tour ===
World Tour has the Chinese Partridge, which is a Chinese version of the original partridge. The following species which appear are:

- A panda
- A rooster
- A crab
- A whale
- A boar
- A polar bear cub
- A walrus
- A saber-toothed raccoon
- A mammoth
- A penguin
- An elephant
- A warthog
- An ostrich
- A sheep
- A tapir
- A parrot
- A grasshopper
- Grizming
- Big Red Parrot
- Santa
- Yeti Bear
- Green Elephant

== Staff ==
| Roles | Names (season 1) | Names (season 2) |
|---|---|---|
| Directors | Victor Moulin, Cedric Lachenaud, Clement Girard and Alexandre Wahl | Victor Moulin, Cedric Lachenaud, Alexandre Wahl, Corentin Lecourt, Idriss Benseghir and Celestine Jacquel-Plays |
| Scriptwriters | Josselin Charier, Antoine Rodelet, Alexandre So, Victor Moulin, Fanny Marseau, Simon Lecocq, Valerie Chappellet, Clement Girard, Cedric Lachenaud, Alexandre Wahl and Sebastien Guerout | Josselin Charier, Antoine Rodelet, Simon Lecocq, Valerie Chappellet, Clement Girard, Victor Moulin, Corentin Lecourt, Idriss Benseghir, Celestine Jacquel-Plays, Cedric Lachenaud, Alexandre Wahl and Sebastien Guerout |

== Production ==
Development of Grizzy & the Lemmings was started in October 2014, when HARI (known as Studio Hari at that time) announced a new animated slapstick comedy series that was set in the Canadian forest, known as Grizzy & the Lemmings, with Studio Hari planning to establish a dedicated department within its Angoulême-based animation production facility to produce and animate the then-upcoming series with the co-founders of Studio Hari, Antoine Rodelet & Josselin Charier, who would serve as creators & producers for the then-upcoming series while Charier would provide the voices of the Lemmings for the series.

A year later in June 2015, Studio Hari officially announced that production for their then-upcoming series had been started, as France Télévisions had commissioned Studio Hari's then-upcoming series to be broadcast for their France 4 channel, as Studio Hari was in negotiations with Turner Broadcasting System to bring Studio Hari's then-upcoming series Grizzy & the Lemmings for its Boomerang channels worldwide and for the US under a presales deal. Four months later in October, during MIPCOM of that year, Studio Hari officially signed a global distribution deal with Turner Broadcasting System to bring Studio Hari's slapstick comedy animated series for Turner's Boomerang channels worldwide, as it marked Boomerang's first original series from Studio Hari.

In May 2016, during production of Studio Hari's then-upcoming global hit, Studio Hari entered the international distribution business, as it had established its very own dedicated in-house international distribution arm division to take control of handling its future programming and Grizzy & the Lemmings in-house, called Hari International.

== Broadcast ==
Grizzy & the Lemmings originates in France, where it aired on networks France 3, Cartoon Network and Boomerang.

- In France, the series aired from December 31, 2016, and it first broadcast on France 3 in the Ludo youth box. Season 1 of the series is re-telecast on Boomerang since September 4, 2017 and on France 4 from February 19, 2018. The broadcast of season 2 began on France 3 and in the Ludo youth box on April 6, 2019. Grizzy & the Lemmings: World Tour, the third and fourth seasons, was premiered on the Okoo platform on July 2, 2021, and from August 28, 2021, on France 4.
- The series initially aired on Boomerang in the UK and Ireland from October 10, 2016. Seasons 1 and 2 aired on Pop, Pop Max and Tiny Pop, while seasons 3 and 4 air on CBBC.
- In Italy, the show is telecast on Boomerang, Boing, Cartoonito and Cartoon Network.
- In Germany, it airs from November 7, 2016, on Boomerang, Super RTL and Cartoon Network.
- In Canada, Grizzy & the Lemmings airs on from December 17, 2016, on Télé-Québec, Family Channel, Cartoon Network, Family CHRGD and Family Jr.
- It also aired in India from January 2, 2017 to 2020 on Pogo. From December 2020, its sister channel Cartoon Network started re-telecasting the first two seasons of the series. Season 3 titled Grizzy & the Lemmings: World Tour released on August 9, 2021 on Cartoon Network. In February 2022, Pogo started broadcasting the series again. In February 2023, the series again shifted to Cartoon Network and aired till September 2023. The Indian version of the show is unique in that it has Hindi dialogue dubbed over by Manoj Pandey (as the narrator of the show and as Grizzy) and Anshul Saxena (as the Lemmings). The characters' names were also localized.
- In the United States, Grizzy & the Lemmings made its debut on April 3, 2017 on Boomerang. The second season of the show premiered on September 2, 2018, The third season of the show premiered on Cartoon Network for the first time on July 18, 2026.
- It also airs in Pakistan on Cartoon Network.
- In Russia, the show aired on Boomerang, Cartoon Network and Carousel.
- It also aired on Cartoon Network in Sri Lanka, the Philippines and Bangladesh.
- In Romania and Turkey, it telecasts on Boomerang and Cartoon Network.
- It also aired in Poland on Cartoon Network, Boomerang, and Puls 2.
- It airs on Boing in Spain.
- In Iceland, it airs on RÚV.
- It also aired in the Netherlands on NPO Zappelin, Cartoon Network and Boomerang.
- In Belgium, the series has been broadcast on OUFtivi since September 2017.
- In Indonesia, the series started broadcasting on ANTV only in 2020, but is still broadcast on RTV, Boomerang and Cartoon Network until now.

=== International broadcast ===
The show airs in the following countries:

| Country | Channels |
|---|---|
| France | France 3 Boomerang; France 4 |
| Angola | Cartoonito |
| Australia | Boomerang; Cartoon Network |
| Austria | Cartoonito |
| Azerbaijan | Xazar TV |
| Bangladesh | Duronto TV |
| Belgium | RTBF; VRT; Boomerang; Cartoonito |
| Bosnia and Herzegovina | Pikaboo; Cartoonito; Cartoon Network |
| Canada | Télé-Québec; Family Jr. Family Channel; WildBrainTV |
| Croatia | HRT 2 Pikaboo; Cartoonito; Cartoon Network |
| Cyprus | Cartoonito |
| (Czech Republic) Czechia | Cartoonito; Cartoon Network; ČT :D; ČT2 |
| Denmark | Cartoonito |
| Finland | Cartoonito |
| Germany | Cartoonito; Super RTL |
| Greece | Cartoonito; ERT; Star Channel |
| Hungary | Cartoonito Kiwi TV; Cartoon Network |
| India | Pogo TV; Cartoon Network |
| Indonesia | Cartoonito; Cartoon Network |
| Iceland | RÚV |
| Italy | Boomerang; Boing; Cartoonito; Cartoon Network |
| (Kurdistan Region) Kurdistan | Kidco |
| Latin America | Boomerang; Cartoonito |
| Malaysia | Cartoonito; Cartoon Network |
| (Middle East and North Africa) Middle East | Cartoon Network Arabic; Cartoonito |
| Montenegro | Pikaboo; Cartoonito; Cartoon Network |
| Mozambique | Cartoonito |
| Netherlands | NPO Zappelin; Cartoonito |
| Norway | Cartoonito, NRK Super |
| Pakistan | Cartoon Network; Pop; LTN Family |
| Philippines | Cartoon Network |
| Poland | Cartoonito; Cartoon Network; Puls 2 |
| Portugal | Zig Zag; Cartoonito |
| Romania | Cartoonito; Cartoon Network |
| Russia | Boomerang; Carousel; Cartoon Networkl; Solntce |
| Serbia | Cartoonito; Cartoon Network; HBO Max |
| Singapore | Cartoonito; Cartoon Network; Mediacorp Channel 5 (through Okto on 5 block); Okto (formerly) |
| South Korea | Cartoon Network; Cartoonito; Anione; Anibox; Champ TV |
| Spain | Boing; Super3 |
| Slovenia | POP TV; Cartoonito; Cartoon Network |
| Sri Lanka | Cartoon Network |
| Sweden | SVT Barn; Boomerang |
| Switzerland | Boomerang; Cartoonito |
| Taiwan | Netflix; Cartoon Network; PTS |
| Turkey | Cartoonito; Minika |
| Turkmenistan | Ýaşlyk |
| Ukraine | Niki Kids; Niki Junior; Cartoonito |
| United Kingdom | Boomerang; Pop (seasons 1 and 2); Pop Max (seasons 1 and 2); Tiny Pop (seasons 1 and 2); CBBC (seasons 3 and 4); Netflix |
| United States | Boomerang (seasons 1 and 2) Cartoon Network (season 3); Netflix |
| Vietnam | Cartoon Network; Netflix |

== Accolades ==
The show won several awards:

- On February 12, 2018, Grizzy & the Lemmings won the Laurier in the youth animation category, at the 23rd ceremony of the Lauriers de la Radio et de la Télévision.
- On February 13, 2018, Grizzy & the Lemmings won the Kidscreen Awards for best-animated series, Kids category, at the 2018 Kidscreen Summit in Miami.
- In April 2018, the show received an EMIL Award for the best children's programs, awarded by the German magazine TV Spielfilm.
- In October 2018, Grizzy & the Lemmings won the award for best TV series at the TOFUZI International Animated Film Festival in Georgia.
- On March 18, 2019, the show won the TV France International Animation export prize at the Trianon in Paris.
- On September 7, 2019, season 2 of Grizzy & the Lemmings was awarded the Best Children's Television Program Award by the International Dytiatko Festival in Ukraine.

== Spin-off ==
=== Baby Lemmings ===
Baby Lemmings is a 3D computer-animated preschool television series which is officially spin off of Grizzy & the Lemmings. The show reimagines the chaotic titular characters as gentler, younger versions of themselves.

The show is set entirely within a Canadian forest. The core narrative treats the vast outdoor world as a massive, natural playground. The infant-aged Lemmings explore their environment and share their joyful philosophy of life with various little animal neighbors.

== In other media ==
A video game titled Grizzy and the Lemmings - Crazy Party released on Nintendo Switch and Nintendo Switch 2 on 7 August 2026. Published and developed by Balio Studio, the game 50 mini-games and supports local multiplayer for up to four players.

In September 2024, Hari Studios had partnered with British-based European licensing & branded product company Fashion UK and crafting company UHU to bring Grizzy & the Lemmings for clothing product range such as T-shirts & trosuers for children & parents and it became avalibale at major and independent mechandising chain stores all over the world while UHU launches limited editions of its glue sticks featuring Grizzy & The Lemmings artwork, which had launched three years later in Dscember of that year.

== See also ==
- List of French animated television series
- List of French television series
- Servbot, a similar type of yellow childlike henchmen in video games developed and published by Capcom.
- Rabbids, a similar group of wild rabbit-like creatures in video games developed and published by Ubisoft.
- Minions (Despicable Me), a similar group of yellow childlike henchmen and published by Universal and Illumination.
- Masha and the Bear, a Russian animated comedy series with a similar premise launched in 2009.
