= The Heroic Quest of the Valiant Prince Ivandoe =

Animated television series

- Genre: Adventure; Animated sitcom
- Created by: Christian Bøving-Andersen; Eva Lee Wallberg; Daniel Lennard (co-creator)
- Based on: Ivanhoe by Walter Scott
- Directed by: Christian Bøving-Andersen; Eva Lee Wallberg; Daniel Lennard
- Voices of: Rasmus Hardiker; Freddie Fox
- Theme music composer: Mathias Valiant; Johan Petersen
- Opening theme: "Prince Ivandoe" (performed by Damian Humbley and Martin Buch)
- Ending theme: "Prince Ivandoe" (Instrumental)
- Composers: Morten Dalsgaard; Xav Clarke
- Countries of origin: Denmark; United Kingdom
- Original languages: English; Danish
- No. of seasons: 1
- No. of episodes: 10 (shorts); 40 (series)

Production
- Executive producers: Sarah Fell; Patricia Hidalgo; Jeanette Reutzer; Bo Østergård; Christian Bøving-Andersen; Eva Lee Wallberg; Vanessa Brookman; Daniel Lennard; Sam Register
- Producers: Sarita Christensen; Charlotte de la Gournerie; Petter Lindblad; Emma Fernando; Hope Devlin Kristiansen; Charlotte Sanchez; Mathieu Courtois
- Editors: Rikke Malene Nielsen; Bo Juhl; Andy Goodman BFE; Nanna Maria Ingemann
- Running time: 3 minutes (season 1); 11 minutes (seasons 2–5)
- Production companies: Sun Creature; Public Service Puljen (short-form series); Hanna-Barbera Studios Europe (Note: Originally known as Cartoon Network Studios Europe for the short-form series.)

Original release
- Network: Cartoon Network (Denmark); YouTube (UK)
- Release: November 20 – November 24, 2017
- Network: Cartoon Network (UK)
- Release: December 5, 2022 – January 16, 2024
- Network: Cartoon Network (US)
- Release: November 11, 2023 – January 31, 2026

Related
- The Amazing World of Gumball; Elliott from Earth; The Wonderfully Weird World of Gumball

The Heroic Quest of the Valiant Prince Ivandoe (often shortened to Prince Ivandoe or just Ivandoe) is an animated television series created by Eva Lee Wallberg and Christian Bøving-Andersen and co-created by Daniel Lennard for Cartoon Network. It began airing on Cartoon Network in Denmark, Finland, Iceland, Norway, and Sweden on November 20, 2017. The series is the second to be produced by Cartoon Network Studios Europe (now Hanna-Barbera Studios Europe). It is a parody of the 1820 British novel Ivanhoe by Sir Walter Scott. The shorts take on a style very reminiscent of Studios Europe's earlier cartoon, The Amazing World of Gumball, featuring animation created with a variety of different sources.

On June 15, 2020, it was announced that Cartoon Network had ordered a long-form series consisting of 40 11-minute episodes. The series made its premiere at the Annecy Festival on June 14, 2022. The series aired on Cartoon Network and Max on November 11, 2023. Although, various international feeds have already started to air the series, starting with Italy where it premiered on December 5, 2022, Latin America and Asia on February 4, 2023, Canada on April 1, 2023, the UK, Turkey, MENA (Middle East and North Africa), CEE, Southern Europe, Benelux, Germany and France on May 13, 2023, and Africa on May 15, 2023.

== Plot ==
The series follows the adventures of Ivandoe (voiced by Rasmus Hardiker), the young prince of the forest whose father, The Mighty Stag, sends him on a quest for the magical Golden Feather of the fearsome Eagle King. Ivandoe and his dedicated squire, a small blue bird named Bert (Freddie Fox in the series, voiced by Hardiker in the shorts), discover new and mysterious areas of the forest and an array of peculiar creatures along the way.

== Cast and characters ==
=== Main voices ===
- Rasmus Hardiker as Prince Ivandoe, Bert (shorts), and various characters
- Freddie Fox as Bert (series) and various characters

=== Other voices ===
- Laura Aikman
- Mathew Baynton
- Brian Blessed
- Mark Bonnar
- Christian Bøving-Andersen
- David Dawson
- Dustin Demri-Burns
- Wayne Forester
- Steve Furst
- Teresa Gallagher
- Hugo Harold-Harrison
- Kieran Hodgson
- Colin Hoult
- Kerry Howard
- Alex Jordan
- Colin McFarlane
- Giles New
- Susie Oosting
- Naz Osmanoglu
- Rob Rackstraw
- Tanya Reynolds
- Jess Robinson
- Elizabeth Sankey
- Madli Võsoberg
- Susan Wokoma

== Episodes ==
Chapter	Episodes	Originally released	
Chapter	Episodes	First released	Last released
Shorts	10	November 20, 2017 (Denmark); December 4, 2023 (US)	November 24, 2017 (Denmark); December 12, 2023 (US)
Chapter One	8	December 5, 2022 (Italy); November 11, 2023 (US)	December 12, 2022 (Italy); December 2, 2023 (US)
Chapter Two	8	December 13, 2022 (Italy); December 9, 2023 (US)	December 16, 2022 (Italy); February 17, 2024 (US)
Chapter Three	8	August 5, 2023 (Central And Eastern Europe); April 6, 2024 (US)	August 5, 2023 (Central And Eastern Europe); May 25, 2024 (US)
Chapter Four	8	October 2, 2023 (Italy); July 13, 2024 (US)	October 11, 2023 (Italy); August 24, 2024 (US)
Chapter Five	8	December 25, 2022 (Italy); December 13, 2025 (US)	January 16, 2024 (Italy); January 31, 2026 (US)

=== Shorts (2017) ===
No.	Title	Written by	Storyboard by	Air date (Denmark)	Air date (US)	Prod. code
1	"The Prince and the Sassy Gnomes"	Christian Bøving-Andersen, Eva Lee Wallberg and Daniel Lennard	Christian Bøving-Andersen and Eva Lee Wallberg	November 20, 2017	December 4, 2023	101
As Prince Ivandoe and his squire Bert begin their quest for the golden feather, they come across a bridge that is constantly being cleaned by six sassy gnomes. The gnomes refuse to let Ivandoe and Bert cross because of the former's "nasty, stinky hooves". They form into mech-style person and Ivandoe and Bert pathetically do the same. When Bert accidentally defecates on the bridge, the gnomes cannot resist doing their jobs and get distracted. Ivandoe and Bert cross with the former claiming that the gnomes "crumbled" from his "royal rage".
2	"The Prince and the Hissy Swan"	Christian Bøving-Andersen, Eva Lee Wallberg and Daniel Lennard	Kenneth Ladekjær and Eva Lee Wallberg	November 20, 2017	December 5, 2023	102
After, poorly, practicing a fierce roar, Ivandoe and Bert come across Prince Svan and Rodent, his squire who had mistaken Ivandoe's high pitched squeal for a damsel in distress. The two princes get into a "Prince-Off" with Svan besting Ivandoe. During the Royal Roar, Svan lets out a mighty quack while Ivandoe makes another squeal. However, a giant fearsome monster, who just so happens to have a similar squeal, arrives. Bert points to Svan and the monster takes him away with Ivandoe claiming to have "kingly" roar and Rodent celebrating his freedom.
3	"The Prince and the Kissy Frog"	Christian Bøving-Andersen, Eva Lee Wallberg and Daniel Lennard	Christian Bøving-Andersen and Eva Lee Wallberg	November 21, 2017	December 5, 2023	103
Ivandoe and Bert come across a tiny, miserable, human-looking prince in the forest. He claims to have once been a tall beautiful bullfrog, but was cursed by a witch and wishes for a kiss to return to normal. Ivandoe has Bert try to kiss the prince on the cheek, but is disgusted by his vocal sac. Bert finally suggests that the prince kiss his own reflection, but just as he is about to do so, Ivandoe kicks him in the water and the two flee leaving the mildly annoyed prince behind.
4	"The Prince and the Thieftress"	Christian Bøving-Andersen, Eva Lee Wallberg and Daniel Lennard	Kenneth Ladekjær and Eva Lee Wallberg	November 21, 2017	December 6, 2023	104
Ivandoe and Bert rescue a female pig named Jezebel from a wolf. Ivandoe becomes smitten with her, but Bert discovers that she is after Ivandoe's locket. Jezebel is actually in league with the wolf, who is actually a raven named Poe, and the two attempt to flee, but end up angrily fighting Ivandoe and Bert. When Ivandoe accidentally slaps Jezebel, she kicks him in the groin and takes his locket, but gives it back when he starts crying. She casually smiles at him when she leaves and Ivandoe keeps her wolf potion as a memento.
5	"The Prince and the Pretty Poodle"	Christian Bøving-Andersen, Eva Lee Wallberg and Daniel Lennard	Kenneth Ladekjær and Eva Lee Wallberg	November 22, 2017	December 7, 2023	105
While traveling through the dark forest, Ivandoe and Bert get captured and tied up by a forest survivalist who happens to be a pink poodle named Cupcake. Cupcake refuses to let them leave and is shown to be quite paranoid about many things. Bert starts using Cupcake's canine instincts to his advantage by calling him a good boy and getting him to untie them, though Ivandoe is offended that he was not called a good boy instead. As they escape, Cupcake sighs "Not again," implying others have used his canine instincts to their advantage.
6	"The Prince and the Raspberry Fairy"	Christian Bøving-Andersen, Eva Lee Wallberg and Daniel Lennard	Christian Bøving-Andersen and Eva Lee Wallberg	November 22, 2017	December 7, 2023	106
Whilst escaping from a grizzly bear, Ivandoe and Bert fall into a cave where a large Troll-woman in a party dress keeps them captive in order to play with them like dolls.
7	"The Prince and the Plucky Duck"	Christian Bøving-Andersen, Eva Lee Wallberg and Daniel Lennard	Christian Bøving-Andersen and Eva Lee Wallberg	November 23, 2017	December 8, 2023	107
Ivandoe dismisses Bert and takes on a duck as his new Squire. The duck proves to be worse than useless when they come face to face with an angry tentacled forest creature. Ivandoe misses Bert and wants him back but is too proud to admit it.
8	"The Prince and the Talking Tree"	Christian Bøving-Andersen, Eva Lee Wallberg and Daniel Lennard	Kenneth Ladekjær and Eva Lee Wallberg	November 23, 2017	December 11, 2023	108
Ivandoe and Bert come across a Talking Tree who promises to tell their fortune in exchange for gold. An enthusiastic Ivandoe hands over his golden locket, just before Bert discovers the sassy gnomes hidden away inside the hollow tree.
9	"The Prince and the Moany Mountain"	Christian Bøving-Andersen, Eva Lee Wallberg and Daniel Lennard	Christian Bøving-Andersen and Eva Lee Wallberg	November 24, 2017	December 12, 2023	109
Ivandoe and Bert must remove an annoying creature from the nose of a magical mountain in order to continue on their quest. They almost come to a very sticky end.
10	"The Prince and the Prom-Date"	Christian Bøving-Andersen, Eva Lee Wallberg and Daniel Lennard	Christian Bøving-Andersen and Eva Lee Wallberg	November 24, 2017	December 11, 2023	110
A formidable king of the deep drags Ivandoe and Bert to the bottom of his lake, so that Ivandoe can be a royal prom-date for his daughter, the devastatingly unattractive Princess Syllabob.

=== Series (2022–24) ===
No.	Title	Written by	Storyboard by	Air date (International)	Air date (US)	Prod. code
Chapter One: Journey to Svanland
1	"The Prince and the Valiant Quest"	Christian Bøving-Andersen, Eva Lee Wallberg and Daniel Lennard	Mads Juul	December 5, 2022 (Italy)	November 11, 2023	101
As Ivandoe and Bert leave for their quest in order to find the Golden feather, a winged Snake steals Ivandoe's map, which is then revealed to be the photograph his mother the Queen gave him before leaving, getting a new sword in the process.
2	"The Prince and the Chicken of Doom"	Christian Bøving-Andersen, Eva Lee Wallberg and Daniel Lennard	Kenneth Ladekjær	December 5, 2022 (Italy)	November 11, 2023	102
Ivandoe and Bert arrive in a village in prey of the so-called "Chicken of Doom" which devastates the village just to get their vegetables. After an attempt to fight it, Ivandoe figures out that the chicken isn't a dreadful beast after all.
3	"The Prince and the Sing Songy Stag"	Christian Bøving-Andersen, Eva Lee Wallberg, Daniel Lennard and Stephen M. Collins	Oriol Vidal	December 6, 2022 (Italy)	November 18, 2023	103
Ivandoe comes across then saves a marsh deer called Brian who reveals to be a bard. However, his bard manners are very blunt and Ivandoe wants to get rid of him in every way possible.
4	"The Prince and the Tears of Triumph"	Christian Bøving-Andersen, Eva Lee Wallberg and Daniel Lennard	Piet Kroon, Kenneth Ladekjær & Mads Juul	December 6, 2022 (Italy)	November 18, 2023	104
Ivandoe saves Jezebel, the thieftress who almost stole his locket. Becoming smitten of her again, he accepts to get her the famous tears of triumph which are said to cure every illness.
5	"The Prince and the Turnip Tricksters"	Christian Bøving-Andersen, Eva Lee Wallberg and Daniel Lennard	Tom Labaff	December 7, 2022 (Italy)	November 25, 2023	105
Ivandoe and Bert arrive at a farm village, where the turnips appear to be missing. Strange creatures show him and his squire the way to find them, but then under the costumes of the creatures they reveal to be the sassy gnomes, who swore revenge against his careless attitude of throwing away turnip tops.
6	"The Prince and the Swoony Swanstress"	Christian Bøving-Andersen, Eva Lee Wallberg and Daniel Lennard	Kenneth Ladekjær	December 7, 2022 (Italy)	November 25, 2023	106
Ivandoe hates swans, especially his worst enemy Prince Svan, but when Bert becomes smitten of a swanstress called Svandaline, revealed to be Svan's sister, who had lost her memory, for a moment he realizes that not all swans are swoony... Until Svandaline gets her memory back and bluntly and meanly rejects Bert.
7	"The Prince and the Feather Fluffer-Upper"	Christian Bøving-Andersen, Eva Lee Wallberg and Daniel Lennard	Bianca Ansems	December 12, 2022 (Italy)	December 2, 2023	107
8	"The Prince and the Feather Fluffer-Upper"	Christian Bøving-Andersen, Eva Lee Wallberg and Daniel Lennard	Bianca Ansems	December 12, 2022 (Italy)	December 2, 2023	108
Part One: After reading a story about the legendary Trident of Tides, for her birthday princess Syllabob wants that for her gift for her Sweet 16, so Axalotyl forces Ivandoe and Bert to retrieve that at the swan palace. Part Two: After getting caught by Svan, Ivandoe attempts to fight him to get the trident which Svan transformed that to a feather fluffer-upper. Once it was to Syllabob's hands, she uses it to get revenge on the Swan Kingdom for stealing the trident and enslaving her kingdom then having her people eaten by the swans.
Chapter Two: Journey to the Forest of Outlaws
9	"The Prince and the Feast of Fopdoodles"	Christian Bøving-Andersen, Eva Lee Wallberg and Daniel Lennard	Akis Dimitrakopoulos	December 13, 2022 (Italy)	December 9, 2023	109
Ivandoe and Bert gets rushly woke up by Toby, Svan's guinea pig servant, who tells him that he was invited by Svan to his mid swanner's feast. At first, Ivandoe's reluctant to go but then he accepts to go, but the truth is that this feast is organised Just to humiliate his guests.
10	"The Prince and the Boasty Boar"	Christian Bøving-Andersen, Eva Lee Wallberg, Daniel Lennard and Stephen M. Collins	Akis Dimitrakopoulos	December 13, 2022 (Italy)	December 9, 2023	110
Ivandoe and Bert come across Boaris von Tusk, a vain boar who organises a tournament in order to get Jezebel's hand. But Jezebel has a trump card...
11	"The Prince and the Blobby Princess"	Christian Bøving-Andersen, Eva Lee Wallberg, Daniel Lennard and Stephen M. Collins	Oriol Vidal	December 14, 2022 (Italy)	December 16, 2023	111
When Princess Syllabob gets brought away by the seagulls, Ivandoe and Bert find her and try to bring her back to the lake, despite Ivandoe's allergy to fish. While going on their journey, Ivandoe will soon develop friendship with Syllabob.
12	"The Prince and the Wise Wizard of Wisdom"	Christian Bøving-Andersen, Eva Lee Wallberg, Daniel Lennard and Stephen M. Collins	Oriol Vidal	December 14, 2022 (Italy)	December 16, 2023	112
Ivandoe meets a vendor called Winky, who accidentally sells him a poison turnip. In a "Wizard of Oz" style, Ivandoe and Bert begin a journey to the wise wizard of wisdom, while encountering other victims on the way. Once at the place, Bert finds out that this wizard is nonother than the Sassy Gnomes, who made everyone they "cured" sign a contract in which all of their belongings was theirs. They managed to defeat the gnomes and they find out that the turnips wasn't poisoned after all.
13	"The Prince and the Squeak of Obedience"	Christian Bøving-Andersen, Eva Lee Wallberg, Daniel Lennard and Stephen M. Collins	Akis Dimitrakopoulos	December 15, 2022 (Italy)	February 3, 2024	113
Some she-cats steal his map and Titan's Thunder, and Ivandoe wants to retrieve them. He meets Cupcake, the poodle who in the shorts who kidnapped them. He wants Ivandoe to ally with him, since the she-cats stole something from him as well, and he reluctantly accepts.
14	"The Prince and the Princenappers"	Christian Bøving-Andersen, Eva Lee Wallberg, Daniel Lennard and Stephen M. Collins	Akis Dimitrakopoulos	December 15, 2022 (Italy)	February 10, 2024	114
Whilst traveling through the notoriously dangerous Forest of Outlaws, Prince Ivandoe is repeatedly "princenapped" by three different thieves gangs, and it's up to Jezebel to save them... Or does she?
15	"The Prince and the Playdate"	Christian Bøving-Andersen, Eva Lee Wallberg, Daniel Lennard and Stephen M. Collins	Eva Figueroa Lopez	December 16, 2022 (Italy)	February 17, 2024	115
16	"The Prince and the Playdate"	Christian Bøving-Andersen, Eva Lee Wallberg, Daniel Lennard and Stephen M. Collins	Eva Figueroa Lopez	December 16, 2022 (Italy)	February 17, 2024	116
Part One: After the events of the previous episode, Jezebel introduces Ivandoe to her mother Grizabel, who immediately thinks her daughter and he make a great couple. Due to his clumsiness, Grizabel makes him the new jester at the castle just until his parents' response to the ransom. But Bert has a plan to flee from the thieves' castle. Part Two: While Boris entertains Jezebel, after Bert lied about Jezebel liking jesters, he and Ivandoe manage to flee, despite Jezebel knowing that Ivandoe had tricked her and starting to track him. In the end though, she then thinks that someone like Svan is better than Ivandoe since he's richer, and Ivandoe begins to feel jealous about that.
Chapter Three: Journey to the Red Squirrel Kingdom
17	"The Prince and the Legendary Rabbit Hood"	Christian Bøving-Andersen, Eva Lee Wallberg, Daniel Lennard and Sarah Courtauld	Adelia Ardovino	August 5, 2023 (Central and Eastern Europe)	April 6, 2024	117
In a parody of Robin Hood, the heroic outlaw named Rabbit Hood, who mistaken Ivandoe as a peasant, instead of an actual prince. She steals Prince Svan's jewels, and gave them to other peasants. As Svan is finding a framed Ivandoe and Bert, they must ask Rabbit Hood for help to become innocent.
18	"The Prince and the Yucky Duckling"	Christian Bøving-Andersen, Eva Lee Wallberg, Daniel Lennard and Mikkel Sommer	Hannes Stummvoll	August 5, 2023 (Central and Eastern Europe)	April 13, 2024	118
Related to the Ugly Duckling, Ivandoe's appearances was ruined by a hooded stranger, who disguise his identity. But always foiled by Bert, who improves Ivandoe better. Instead, the stranger kidnaps Bert, for Ivandoe to come.
19	"The Prince and the Unruly Royal"	Christian Bøving-Andersen, Eva Lee Wallberg, Daniel Lennard and Stephen M. Collins	Akis Dimitrakopoulos	August 5, 2023 (Central and Eastern Europe)	April 20, 2024	119
Ivandoe's cousin, Dudley, a misbehaving lunatic, is from instructions from the Mighty Stag Kingdom. Dudley, however, causes Ivandoe to misbehave as well. The two leads into a correctional school made out of candy, owned by a strict governess. That was similar to the "Candy House" story.
20	"The Prince and the Show-Off Stallion"	Christian Bøving-Andersen, Eva Lee Wallberg, Daniel Lennard and James Mcnicholas	Adelia Ardovino	August 5, 2023 (Central and Eastern Europe)	April 27, 2024	120
Ivandoe enters a Bunny village, which gets attacked by a monstrous beastie. The hero loses his confidence, as a mighty stallion was better fighting than him. But the stallion only saves the bunnies because he was demanding feeds for carrots.
21	"The Prince and the Dark Lord Of Moletown"	Christian Bøving-Andersen, Eva Lee Wallberg and Daniel Lennard	Tom Labaff	August 5, 2023 (Central and Eastern Europe)	May 4, 2024	121
Ivandoe enters the underground Moletown. The moles worshiped him, because their dark lord thought his blindness cured by Ivandoe himself, for giving him the cure, back from The Tears of Triumph.
22	"The Prince and the Squire-Off"	Christian Bøving-Andersen, Eva Lee Wallberg, Daniel Lennard and Stephen M. Collins	Oriol Vidal	August 5, 2023 (Central and Eastern Europe)	May 11, 2024	122
Bert and Ivandoe enters a competition for squires called the Squire-Off tournament. Against squires, Maggie, Toby, the gnomes, and Ducky from the shorts.
23	"The Prince and the Kissy Curse"	Christian Bøving-Andersen, Eva Lee Wallberg and Daniel Lennard	David Vinicombe, Oriol Vidal, Sergio García and Mads Juul	August 5, 2023 (Central and Eastern Europe)	May 18, 2024	123
Ivandoe got tricked by the same little frogman (revealed to be named Fabian) from the shorts, into kissing him. However, he got caught into the spell too, with frog arms. Ivandoe had to bring Fabian back to his ex-girlfriend the Batwitch.
24	"The Prince and the Nutty Wedding"	Christian Bøving-Andersen, Eva Lee Wallberg, Daniel Lennard and Sarah Courtauld	Adelia Ardovino	August 5, 2023 (Central and Eastern Europe)	May 25, 2024	124
Ivandoe enters the Red Squirrel Kingdom, and won a royalty contest. Since he won the prestigious contest, Ivandoe had to marry Princess Sprinkle Joy. Him and Bert need to escape the wedding.
Chapter Four: Journey to the Underground Kingdom of the Ogres
25	"The Prince and the Golden Father"	Christian Bøving-Andersen, Eva Lee Wallberg and Daniel Lennard	Magnus Kravik	October 2, 2023 (Italy)	July 13, 2024	125
After saving the magical "Wishapillar", Ivandoe gets one wish as a chance to finish his quest. He accidentally hiccupped feather wrong. Instead, Ivandoe got a needy, golden "Father".
26	"The Prince and the Birthday Bluesies"	Christian Bøving-Andersen, Eva Lee Wallberg, Daniel Lennard and Thom Phipps	Adrian Maganza	October 3, 2023 (Italy)	July 20, 2024	126
It's Ivandoe's birthday, but he doesn't get any gifts nor a party. So Bert decides to prepare him the best party he ever had.
27	"The Prince and the Chosen One"	Christian Bøving-Andersen, Eva Lee Wallberg, Daniel Lennard and Kate Davies	Akis Dimitrakopoulos	October 4, 2023 (Italy)	July 27, 2024	127
Bert becomes the chosen one as leader of the council of heroes after lifting their sword, with Henry the Hedgehog retired being leader. Because of being squire for Sir Bertbut (which is Bert), Ivandoe learns that the heroes were talking about the "Epic Griffin of Doom", making him had to fight it.
28	"The Prince and the Tickly Torment"	Christian Bøving-Andersen, Eva Lee Wallberg, Daniel Lennard and Sarah Courtauld	Magnus Kravik	October 5, 2023 (Italy)	August 3, 2024	128
Ivandoe accidentally falls into a scary underground lair that houses a secret society. Under the leadership of Queen Mother of Svanland, its members are Prince Svan, Princess Sprinkle Joy, Lady Agatha, and Barron von Twinkletoes. The group has plans to punish the peasants of the five kingdoms for their past humiliations.
29	"The Prince and the Ducky Day"	Christian Bøving-Andersen, Eva Lee Wallberg, Daniel Lennard and James McNicholas	Akis Dimitrakopoulos	October 6, 2023 (Italy)	August 10, 2024	129
Ivandoe discovers a special day of his old squire Ducky called "Ducky Day". It ends when Ducky eats a single grape, and everything stood the same every day. For a further 76 days, Ivandoe repeatedly suffers an awful routine.
30	"The Prince and the All-Alone Gnome"	Christian Bøving-Andersen, Eva Lee Wallberg, Daniel Lennard and Stephen McCollins	Akis Dimitrakopoulos	October 9, 2023 (Italy)	August 17, 2024	130
Ivandoe finds a left-alone Hansi, one of the sassy gnomes needed help from him by returning to Bridge #249. During the journey, Hansi was addicted into jumping on Ivandoe's head, related to the "Gnomes Assemble" form. Afterwards, Ivandoe develops a relationship with him.
31	"The Prince and the Dreamy Ogre"	Christian Bøving-Andersen, Eva Lee Wallberg, Daniel Lennard and James McNicholas	Oriol Vidal	October 10, 2023 (Italy)	August 24, 2024	131
32	"The Prince and the Dreamy Ogre"	Christian Bøving-Andersen, Eva Lee Wallberg, Daniel Lennard and James McNicholas	Oriol Vidal	October 11, 2023 (Italy)	August 24, 2024	132
Part One: Ivandoe discovers a secret passage to the treacherous Underground Kingdom of the Ogres on the map. And he met a singing, friendly ogre named Prince Goldenlocks, who wanted to escape to the surface world. Part Two: Bert and Goldenlocks disguised Ivandoe into an ogre in order to escape, but if they're busted, they will get devoured by a mutant-sized salamander. As they escape, the surface was more ironic than Goldenlocks was expecting.
Chapter Five: Journey to Eagle Mountain
33	"The Prince and the Sassy Skaters"	Christian Bøving-Andersen, Eva Lee Wallberg and Daniel Lennard	Oriol Vidal	January 8, 2024 (Italy)	December 13, 2025	133
Ivandoe has had enough of Prince Goldenlocks' silly songs and wants to get him out of his way. But when Ivandoe is captured by the terrifying ice skater Daddy, the father of the sassy gnomes, Goldenlocks is his only hope.
34	"The Prince and the Fraudy Lord"	Christian Bøving-Andersen, Eva Lee Wallberg and Daniel Lennard	Akis Dimitrakopoulos	January 9, 2024 (Italy)	December 27, 2025	134
When Ivandoe saves Lord Roderick, they quickly become good friends. They have a lot in common and look closely identical. But Bert is suspicious, especially when the Eagle Mountain map disappears...
35	"The Prince and the Lonely Trollstress"	Christian Bøving-Andersen, Eva Lee Wallberg and Daniel Lennard	Hannes Stummvoll	December 25, 2023 (Italy)	December 20, 2025	135
During Christmas Day, Ivandoe and Bert got trapped inside the trollstress' home and used as dolls yet again, but much worse than the last time. The two needed to find another solution to escape the childish party.
36	"The Prince and the Heroic Hooded Hermit"	Christian Bøving-Andersen, Eva Lee Wallberg, Daniel Lennard and Thom Phipps	Sergio García	January 10, 2024 (Italy)	January 3, 2026	136
When Prince Ivandoe becomes trapped in the Bog of Despair, Bert asks the mysterious Hooded Hermit for help. But can Bert restore this legendary hero's confidence in time to save his master from drowning?
37	"The Prince and the Foggy Bog Lady"	Christian Bøving-Andersen, Eva Lee Wallberg and Daniel Lennard	Adelia Ardovino	January 11, 2024 (Italy)	January 10, 2026	137
Prince Ivandoe rushes into the misty swamp to find turnips, but he encounters the fearsome Swamp Lady. Meanwhile, Bert is bewitched by the Queen of the Mist. But which one should we fear the most?
38	"The Prince and the Three Headed Knight"	Christian Bøving-Andersen, Eva Lee Wallberg and Daniel Lennard	Akis Dimitrakopoulos	January 12, 2024 (Italy)	January 17, 2026	138
When Prince Ivandoe discovers a secret chest, guarded by a three-headed knight, he is certain that the Golden Feather is inside. However, it actually contains another kind of feathering.
39	"The Prince and the Doomy Loom of Destiny"	Christian Bøving-Andersen, Eva Lee Wallberg, Daniel Lennard and Thom Phipps	Hannes Stummvoll	January 15, 2024 (Italy)	January 24, 2026	139
The heroic destiny of Ivandoe is predicted by the sisters Agatha and Hildr. When their Loom of Destiny predicts that Ivandoe will not find the Golden Feather, he decides to take his destiny into his own hands.
40	"The Prince and the Scrawny Squire"	Christian Bøving-Andersen, Eva Lee Wallberg and Daniel Lennard	Hannes Stummvoll	January 16, 2024 (Italy)	January 31, 2026	140
Very close to Eagle Mountain, Ivandoe and Bert are completely trapped by an avalanche. Their thoughts turn to their very first meeting and the beginnings of their quest. Will they live long enough to see it through?

== Broadcast ==
Broadcast of the series began in January 2018 throughout Central and Eastern Europe on the Cartoon Network, including Germany, Italy, Portugal, Poland, and Spain, and in February 2018 in France and Sub-Saharan Africa. In the United Kingdom, episodes premiere exclusively on the feed's YouTube channel. It aired in Latin America and Brazil on July 5, 2018. In the United States, it premiered on November 11, 2023.

The series also airs on DR Ramasjang in Denmark.

== See also ==
- The Amazing World of Gumball
- Elliott from Earth
- The Wonderfully Weird World of Gumball
