= Cartoon Network (Central and Eastern Europe) =

Central and Eastern European television channel

Cartoon Network CEE
- Country: United Kingdom; Germany
- Broadcast area: List: Albania; Baltic states; Bulgaria; Caucasus; CIS; Czech; Former Yugoslavia; Georgia; Hungary; Moldova; Poland; Romania; Slovakia; Ukraine
- Network: Cartoon Network
- Headquarters: London, United Kingdom; Munich, Germany

Programming
- Languages: List: Bulgarian; Croatian (continuity and bumpers in English); Czech; English; Hungarian; Polish; Romanian; Russian; Serbian (continuity and bumpers in English); Slovene (continuity and bumpers in English)
- Picture format: 1080i HDTV (downscaled to 16:9 576i for the SDTV feed)

Ownership
- Parent: Skydance Corporation
- Sister channels: Cartoonito; CNN International; Warner TV

History
- Launched: 1 June 1998; 28 years ago (as in height Cartoon Network Europe); 18 September 2024; 2 years ago (as a newly-merged channel)
- Closed: 9 March 2022; 4 years ago (Russia)

Cartoon Network is a Central European pay television channel broadcast in the Baltic States, Bulgaria, CIS, Croatia, Czech Republic, Hungary, Moldova, Poland, Romania, Serbia, Slovakia and Slovenia. It launched on 1 June 1998 and is owned by Skydance Corporation under its international division.

Throughout September 2024, most of Cartoon Network's European channels (except for the UK, Ireland, Turkey and Italy channels) were gradually remerged into pan-regional feeds. Cartoon Network CEE has a brand new signal on 18 September 2024, merging the Polish and RSEE feed. Later, on September 25th, the Western European feed launched, merging with the Dutch, French, German, Scandinavian, and Portuguese feeds. As of the same day, Cartoon Network's current slogan in Central and Eastern Europe and Western Europe since 2024 is: This is your Cartoon Network.

== History ==
Before the feeds united, Poland launched its channel on 1 June 1998. Hungary, Romania and Moldova received the Polish feed of Cartoon Network on 30 September 2002, broadcasting in Polish, Hungarian, Romanian and English.

On 4 January 2008, the channel started broadcasting 24 hours a day in Romania. Initially only TV provider Dolce offered the 24h feed. A CEE feed specifically for Romania and Hungary was launched, replacing Cartoon Network Poland on 1 October 2009.

On 1 April 2015, the channel started broadcasting 24 hours a day in Hungary.

Czechia and Slovakia used to receive this feed in English. However, on 20 September 2017, a Czech audio track was added to the channel in the Czech Republic and Slovakia. That same year, on 20 October, Cartoon Network started broadcasting 24 hours a day on all providers in Romania, following the end of timesharing with TNT (now known as Warner TV).

On 26 February 2018, the channel launched a high-definition feed. Later, on 15 October, Cartoon Network changed its aspect ratio from 4:3 to 16:9. On 18 September 2024, Cartoon Network CEE merged with the Polish and RSEE feed.

=== Poland ===
Cartoon Network Poland was launched on 1 June 1998, replacing Cartoon Network Europe.

On 30 September 2002, the channel began airing in Hungary and Romania, thus sharing its video feed with those countries while adding two additional audio tracks in Hungarian and Romanian.

On 1 March 2007, Cartoon Network Poland started broadcasting 24 hours a day. On 1 October 2009, a separate feed of Cartoon Network was created for Hungary and Romania, while the two additional audio tracks that were previously to the channel added in September 2002 were moved there. Both feeds are transmitted from Warsaw. The channel also carried a Toonami programming block between 2002 and 2006.

On 14 October 2015, Cartoon Network launched in HD.

On 1 September 2016, Cartoon Network Poland rebranded using Check It 4.0 package.

On 4 June 2018, Cartoon Network Poland aired Cartoon Network Classics block for the first time.

On 31 December 2019, Cartoon Network Poland aired Cartoon Network Classics block for the last time.

On 1 January 2021, Cartoon Network Poland began airing with the Czech license from RRTV.

On 2 September 2024, Cartoon Network Poland started sharing schedule with the CEE and RSEE feed. On September 18, 2024 Cartoon Network Poland merged with CEE and RSEE feed.

=== Southeastern Europe ===
From 14 April 1996 to 6 April 1997, the Russian channel TV-6 broadcast the Cartoon Network block with the channel's bumpers dubbed in Russian, as well as two whole series: The Jetsons and the classic Tom and Jerry theatrical cartoons.

In October 1996, Cartoon Network Europe began to be rebroadcast in English by the pay-TV operator Kosmos-TV (owned by American company Metromedia International), the duration of the broadcasts was not fixed. Broadcasting was carried out from 5:00 to 21:00 Moscow time, and the TNT UK TV channel was broadcast in the evening. In October 1999, the channel TCM Europe began broadcasting during non-working airtime instead of TNT UK.

On 1 November 1999, the pan-European version of Cartoon Network officially began broadcasting on the territory of Russia and in the CIS and Baltic countries on the platform of the Russian satellite operator NTV Plus and in other cable networks, broadcasting from the Sirius 2 (partially duplicated). Broadcasting was from 8:00 to 23:00 Moscow time, with the TV channel TCM Europe being broadcast at overnight hours. The distributor of the channel in the CIS and the Baltic States was Chello Zone.

On 1 April 2005, the pan-European Cartoon Network received a full-fledged Russian audio track, with dubs commissioned at studios in Moscow and St. Petersburg.

On 21 April 2006, a rebranding was carried out, which included an updated version of the logo and a new design. Later, the Cartoon Network Cinema block appeared.

In 2008, a representative office of Turner Broadcasting System Russia opened in Moscow, which began distributing the channel.

On 1 October 2009, a separate feed was established — Cartoon Network Russia and Southeastern Europe (CN RSEE), broadcasting in the CIS, Baltic States and Southeastern Europe. There is also a new block Cartoon Toon Toon. Both the CIS countries and Bulgaria received separate advertising. Ahead of the new feed's launch in Bulgaria, special events were held in Sofia, Varna, Plovdiv and Stara Zagora.

On 26 November 2010, a new corporate identity was introduced, as well as a new design. In the same year, a website was launched - cartoonnetwork.ru and cartoonnetwork.bg, the site is controlled and maintained in London.

Since March 2011, with the switch of the channel to 24-hour broadcasting, timesharing with TCM Europe on its frequencies ceased.

As of 2014, the editorial office of the TV channel was located in Munich, however, the playout was still done from London. In the same year, the Marathon Mix block appeared.

At the end of 2015, it became known that the distributor of the channel in Russia and the CIS would be Media Alliance, a subsidiary of the state media holding National Media Group and Discovery Inc. The transaction was completed in May 2016. The company managed the Russian legal entity of the channel — Turner Children's Programs LLC, which was headed by Discovery representative Grigory Lavrov, who was also the general director of Media Alliance.

Since 18 November 2020, Cartoon Network RSEE has a Czech license (RRTV) in order to ensure the continuation of legal broadcasting in the European Union (EU) in accordance with the EU Directive on Audiovisual Media Services (AVMSD) and the law on the single market following the withdrawal of the UK from the EU. Since the Czech Republic has minimum broadcasting rules, it was chosen for licensing purposes in the EU. The broadcasting center of the channel is still located in London.

Croatian, Serbian and Slovene audio tracks were added on 6 November 2021.

On 9 March 2022, the channel ceased broadcasting in Russia with the final program being an episode of Craig of the Creek, along with Boomerang and Discovery channels, as part of a response by WarnerMedia and Discovery Inc. on the actions of the Russian invasion of Ukraine, which happened more than a month before its merger was finalized. It continues broadcasting in other CIS and Baltic countries.

From 1 August 2022, some new cartoon series began to be released without Russian dubbing.

On 17 April 2023, the version of the channel stopped being distributed to Latvia and was replaced by the Scandinavian version at the request of the Czech regulator between the Latvian regulator NEPLP.

On 18 September 2024, Cartoon Network RSEE merged with the CEE and Polish feed.

== Programming ==
- The Amazing World of Gumball
- Underdog and the Canine Defenders
- Bakugan
- Clarence
- Craig of the Creek
- Dwarf Flash
- The Heroic Quest of the Valiant Prince Ivandoe
- Minions & Monsters
- Lana Longbeard
- Lego Dreamzzz
- Looney Tunes Cartoons
- Regular Show
- Teen Titans Go!
- Tiny Toons Looniversity
- Total DramaRama
- Totally Spies!
- We Baby Bears
- The Wonderfully Weird World of Gumball
- Adventure Time: Side Quests
- Regular Show: The Lost Tapes

== See also ==
- Cartoon Network WE
- The Cartoon Network, Inc.
