= Cartoon Network (Portugal) =

Defunct Portuguese pay TV channel

- Country: United Kingdom
- Broadcast area: Portugal; Angola; Cape Verde; Mozambique
- Headquarters: London, UK

Programming
- Languages: Portuguese; English (dual audio)
- Picture format: 16:9; HDTV 1080i SDTV 576i 16:9 (downscaled)

Ownership
- Owner: Warner Bros. Discovery EMEA
- Sister channels: Cartoonito; CNN; Discovery Channel; Discovery Showcase HD; Eurosport 1 Eurosport 2 Food Network; Investigation Discovery; TLC; Travel Channel

History
- Launched: 17 September 1993; 33 years ago (as Cartoon Network Europe); 1 October 2013; 13 years ago (as an independent channel in Angola, Cape Verde and Mozambique); 3 December 2013; 12 years ago (as an independent channel in Portugal)
- Closed: September 25, 2024; 2 years ago
- Replaced by: Cartoon Network WE

Cartoon Network Portugal, commonly abbreviated as CN, was a British-managed Portuguese digital cable and satellite television channel launched on 3 December 2013 and was owned by Warner Bros. Discovery EMEA under its international division.

Cartoon Network (both before and after merging) was the most-watched kids and teens' channel in Portugal, surpassing Disney Channel since 2022.

On 25 September 2024, Cartoon Network Portugal merged with the French, Dutch, German and Scandinavian feeds.

== History ==
The Pan-European feed received in Portugal, Angola and Mozambique was transmitted for a long time (from 17 September 1993 to 3 December 2013), this feed is now CN Africa.

The Portuguese-language version of the channel started to broadcast their feed to Angola and Mozambique on 1 October 2013, coincidentally a few months after Cartoon Network Spain closed.

On 3 December 2013, the Portuguese channel was officially launched in Portugal on all cable operators, switching from the Pan-European version (in English). at 20:00, broadcasting in 16:9. The Pan-European English feed was removed from the operator NOS, along with other foreign language international channels on 1 February 2010, and the Portuguese-language Panda Biggs was included in its place.

When the Pan-European feed was still being broadcast, the daily broadcast was 15 hours (from 05:00 to 20:00) in Portugal. During that time, the channel shared time with TCM, focusing on classic movies and professional wrestling, and in its final years, with TCM Europe. Some cable TV operators preferred dividing the two channels with their own channel (some with a description of their opening and closing times). Shortly after the Portuguese version of the channel launched, TCM and Boomerang Africa ceased broadcasts in Portugal.

Around February 2014, the channel started airing advertisements, but in March 2014, they stopped airing them, returning in the middle of the month.

Cartoon Network Portugal was also the first European CN feed to adopt the CHECK it 3.0 branding, which happened on 30 May 2014. On 31 March 2017, it changed its design to a version based on the American feed's Dimensional branding.

On 26 April 2018, Boomerang Portugal was launched on Nowo and Vodafone. This version had already been launched in Angola and Mozambique on 21 April 2015 and the European channel (English-language) stopped being broadcast when Cartoon Network was launched in Portuguese. In 2022 the channel arrived on MEO schedule, only available on IPTV and Satellite. Boomerang was later replaced by Cartoonito on 23 March 2023 and later 11 September 2024, it was replaced by Cartoonito WE, merged with the Nordic countries.

The channel begun broadcasting in HD in 2022 on MEO and NOS.

On 16 September 2024 (after it had been announced in July 2024 by Warner Bros. Discovery EMEA), Cartoon Network Portugal begun following the same schedule as Cartoon Network in the Nordics, France, Germany and the Netherlands. On 25 September the unification took a step further as the Portuguese feed was merged with the feeds mentioned above. From now on, these individual feeds have been phased out and the only difference between the broadcast in each country is an exclusive sub feed for local ad breaks.

== Programming ==
=== Current programming ===
Title	Portuguese title	Premiere date	Status
Cartoon Network Studios and Hanna-Barbera Studios Europe original programming
Clarence	Clarence	29 November 2014 (original); 16 June 2024 (return)	Rerunning; Replaced by Western Europe
Adventure Time	Hora de Aventuras	1 October 2013	Rerunning; Replaced by Western Europe
The Amazing World of Gumball	O Incrível Mundo de Gumball	1 October 2013	Rerunning; Replaced by Western Europe
Regular Show	Regular Show	5 April 2014	Rerunning; Replaced by Western Europe
Uncle Grandpa	Titio Avô	26 April 2014	Rerunning
Steven Universe	Steven Universe	1 June 2014	Rerunning; Replaced by Western Europe
We Bare Bears	Nós os Ursos	28 November 2015	Rerunning; Replaced by Western Europe
Apple & Onion	Maçã e Cebolinha	5 October 2018	Rerunning
Craig of the Creek	O Mundo de Craig	10 November 2018	Currently Premiering New Episodes; Replaced by Western Europe
We Baby Bears	Nós os Ursinhos	2022	Running; Replaced by Western Europe
The Heroic Quest of the Valiant Prince Ivandoe (main series)	O Destemido Príncipe Ivandoe	13 May 2023	Running; Replaced by Western Europe
Other Warner Bros. TV original programming
Teen Titans Go!	Teen Titans Go!	10 November 2014	Currently premiering new episodes Replaced by Western Europe
Bunnicula	Bunnicula	25 May 2018 (original); 2024 (return); Replaced by Western Europe	Rerunning, formerly on Boomerang; Replaced by Western Europe
Jellystone!	Jellystone!	2021	Rerunning; Replaced by Western Europe
Looney Tunes Cartoons	Looney Tunes Cartoons	2022	Rerunning, formerly on Boomerang; Replaced by Western Europe
Acquired programming
Jade Armor	Jade Armor	10 October 2022	Rerunning; Replaced by Western Europe
Hero Inside	Hero Inside	January 2024	Currently on Hiatus; Replaced by Western Europe

=== Specials ===
Specials
Title	Portuguese title	Premiere date	Status
The Powerpuff Girls: Dance Pantsed	As Powerpuff Girls: Bailarico Sem Fim	22 March 2014	
Planos + Top	Planos + Top	2023-2024	
Special "We Love Gumball"	Especial "We Love Gumball"	August 2024	
Carnavatoon	Carnavatoon"	2014	

=== Former programming ===
Title	Portuguese title	Premiere date	Status
Cartoon Network Studios and Hanna-Barbera Studios Europe original programming
The Adventures of Don Coyote and Sancho Panda	As Aventuras de Dom Coiote e Sancho Panda	1990s	
Fangface	Bicudo, o Lobisomem	17 September 1993	
The Fruitties	As frutas	1990s	
My Favorite Martians	O Meu Marcianos Favorito	1995	
Sharky & George	Sharky e George	December 1996	
Taz-Mania	Taz-Mania	1 September 1997	
The Adventures of Batman	As Aventuras do Batman	1990s	
The Adventures of Batman & Robin	As Aventuras de Batman e Robin	1990s	
The Adventures of Gulliver	As Aventuras de Gulliver	1990s	
The Adventures of Rocky and Bullwinkle and Friends	As Aventuras de Rocky e Bullwinkle e Amigos	1990s	
Alvin and the chipmunks	Alvim e os Esquilos	1994-1995	
Batfink	Batfino	1994-1997	
Batman: The Animated Series	Batman	1 September 1997	
Galaxy Goof-Ups	Os Trapalhões Espaciais	17 September 1993	
Gilligan's Planet	Planeta de Gilligan	17 September 1993	
Galtar and the Golden Lance	Galtar e a Lança Dourada	1994	
The Funky Phantom	Fantasminha Legal	17 September 1993	
The Smurfs	Os Estrunfes	1990s	
Snorks	Os Snorkels	1990s	
Pound Puppies	Os Cãezinhos do Canil	1990s	
Paw Paws	os Ursinhos Mágicos	1990s	
A Touch of Blue in the Stars	Um toque de azul nas estrelas	January 1996	
Spartakus and the Sun Beneath the Sea	Spartakus e o Sol Submarino	1990s	
Little Dracula	Pequeno Drácula	1990s	
The Raccoons	A Família Guaxinim	1995	
Dexter's Laboratory	O Laboratório do Dexter	2 September 1996	Transmitted from the EMEA feed
The Powerpuff Girls	As Powerpuff Girls	4 January 1999	Transmitted from the EMEA feed
Ben 10	Ben 10	1 October 2013	Transmitted from the EMEA feed
Ben 10: Alien Force	Ben 10: Alien Force	1 October 2013	Transmitted from the EMEA feed
Ben 10: Omniverse	Ben 10: Omniverse	1 October 2013	Transmitted from the EMEA feed
The Grim Adventures of Billy & Mandy	As Aventuras Assustadoras de Billy e Mandy	1 February 2014	Transmitted from the EMEA feed and formerly on 2:
Over the Garden Wall	Para Lá do Jardim	23 March 2015	Miniseries
The Powerpuff Girls (2016)	As Powerpuff Girls	30 April 2016	Transmitted from the EMEA feed, Ended
The Heroic Quest of the Valiant Prince Ivandoe (shorts)	O Destemido Príncipe Ivandoe	27 January 2018	Ended
Ben 10 (2016)	Ben 10	15 October 2016	Ended
Victor and Valentino	Victor e Valentino	16 September 2019	Ended
OK K.O.! Let's Be Heroes	OK K.O.! Let's Be Heroes	13 November 2017	Ended
Summer Camp Island	Acampamento Mágico	19 January 2019	Ended
Mao Mao: Heroes of Pure Heart	Mao Mao: Heróis de Coração Puro	8 January 2020	Ended
Other Warner Bros. TV original programming
The Tom and Jerry Show	O Show do Tom e Jerry	1 May 2014	Currently on Cartoonito
Scooby-Doo! Mystery Incorporated	Scooby-Doo! Mistérios, Lda.	6 December 2014	Rerunned, formerly on Boomerang
Be Cool, Scooby-Doo!	Be Cool, Scooby-Doo!	12 February 2016	Rerunned, formerly on Boomerang
Justice League Action	Justice League Action	11 February 2017	Rerunned
ThunderCats Roar	ThunderCats Roar	25 May 2020	Ended
Unikitty!	Unikitty	16 April 2018	Ended
Scooby-Doo and Guess Who?	Scooby-Doo e Companhia	2022	Rerunned, formerly on Boomerang
Acquired programming
The Garfield Show	Garfield	3 December 2013	Rerunned, formerly on RTP2 and Boomerang and now on Panda Kids.
Johnny Test	Jonathan Test	3 December 2013	Rerunned, formerly on Biggs
Mixels	Mixels	15 February 2014	Rerunned
Just Kidding	Just Kidding	16 June 2014	Rerunned
Dragons: Riders of Berk	Dragões: O Esquadrão de Berk	2 June 2014	Rerunned
Dragons: Defenders of Berk	Dragões: Os Defensores de Berk	13 October 2014	Rerunned
Dr. Dimensionpants	Dr. Dimensional	19 January 2015	Rerunned
Doraemon (2005)	Doraemon	28 February 2015 (first run); 12 June 2023 (second run)	Rerunned, formerly on Boomerang/Cartoonito
Doraemon (1979)	Doraemon	1 June 2015	Rerunned, formerly on Canal Panda, RTP1 & RTP2, using Canal Panda's dub
Total Drama: Pahkitew Island	Drama Total: Ilha Pahkitew	29 June 2015	Rerunned
Total Drama All-Stars	Drama Total: Famosos	16 July 2015	Rerunned
Cartoon Network Toys	Toys na Cartoon Network	1 October 2015	Rerunned
Numb Chucks	Numb Chucks	15 September 2014	Rerunned
Grojband	Grojband	4 February 2015 (Post-Premiere); 6 July 2015 (official Premiere)	Rerunned, formerly on SIC K
Lego Nexo Knights	Nexo Knights	21 March 2016	Rerunned
Yo-kai Watch	Yo-kai Watch	16 May 2016	Ended
Total Drama Presents: The Ridonculous Race	Drama Total Apresenta: Corrida Alucinante	4 July 2016	Rerunned
LazyTown	Vila Moleza	27 June 2015	Rerunned
Supernoobs	Supernovatos	21 March 2016	Rerunned
Cloudy with a Chance of Meatballs	Chovem Almôndegas	8 January 2018	Rerunned
La Casa de los Retos (in English: The House of Challenges)	A Casa dos Desafios	2019	Currently on hiatus, Original programming from Boing in the Spain. Not aired since 2024.
Wipeout	Wipeout	2022	Ended

== Controversies ==
Properly throughout September 2024, Cartoon Network Portugal was in the channel's censorship and controversies, when it moved to Western Europe.

=== Tom and Jerry Shorts ===
Between May and October 2014, the channel censored 103 Tom and Jerry shorts. The censorship was motivated by the channel's decision not to acquire the Portuguese-dubbed version from PSB (which dubbed the golden age of American animation onto VHS), which is notable for containing xenophobic and racist caricatures and actions, as well as violence involving weapons, household objects and torture. With this in mind, and to avoid controversy and problems with the media, Cartoon Network only aired the silent episodes (although it censored some of them) and only subtitled the graphics. Another censorship occurred during the Gene Deitch period (1960 - 1962), in which all episodes were censored.

=== Scooby-Doo ===
On 29 October 2021, Cartoon Network Portugal rebroadcast as a Halloween special, the first live-action Scooby-Doo film, which already had a Portuguese dub produced by Matinha, but for the same reasons, it was broadcast on original subtitled version.

=== Application in MEO ===
In June 2013 (before the launch of the Portuguese version of the channel), MEO, owned by Portugal Telecom (now Altice Portugal) launched an app on MEO Kids, providing content from the channel in Portuguese. Among the available content are the series Dexter's Laboratory, The Powerpuff Girls, Ben 10 and Ben 10: Alien Force, dubbed in Portuguese, and three games (two from Ben 10 and one from The Grim Adventures of Billy and Mandy).

=== Doraemon ===
In 2015 and 2016, the channel re-aired the two anime series "Doraemon (2005)" and "Doraemon (1979)" and the film "Doraemon: Nobita and the New Steel Troops—Winged Angels", with several scenes from both the anime and the film having been cut or censored.

It then lost exclusivity in 2018, moved only to the Boomerang/Cartoonito Portugal channel and stopped broadcasting in May 2023. Then between 2023 and 2024, Cartoon Network Portugal re-aired the 2005 anime series.

=== Entra na onda de diversão Cartoon Network ===
Between June and August 2024, Cartoon Network Portugal aired the 2024 summer ident: Entra na onda de diversão Cartoon Network [Get on the Cartoon Network fun bandwagon].

Its ident on the Portuguese children's channel had been adapted to show the characters in the series.

=== Restart ===
From 1 April 2017 to 25 September 2024, the Cartoon Network Portugal channel aired the quick restart in the "Dimensional" era graphic that appeared the loop of this image in each showing, similar to the American channel.

Since 26 September 2024, with the move to Western Europe, the channel has used the 2016 functional restart in the Check It 4.0 graphic era

== See also ==
- Cartoon Network (Western Europe)
- Warner Bros. Discovery EMEA
