= Baby Lemmings =

French animated television series

- Created by: Antoine Rodelet; Josselin Charier; Cédric Lachenaud
- Based on: Grizzy & the Lemmings by Antoine Rodelet & Josselin Charier
- Composer: Les Freres Sonor
- Country of origin: France

Production
- Producers: Antoine Rodelet; Josselin Charier
- Production company: Hari Studios

Original release
- Network: France 4
- Release: 11 May 2026 – present

Baby Lemmings (French: Bébés Lemmings) is a 3D computer-animated preschool television series, created by Antoine Rodelet and Josselin Charier, that serves as a spin-off to the hit slapstick comedy Grizzy & the Lemmings series, produced by the French CGI animation production company Hari Studios, the series follows young baby lemmings, as the preschool spin-off series reimagines the chaotic rodents as gentler, younger versions of the lemmings, who navigate the world through innocent, imaginative play as they explore the Canadian forest and transform their environment into a playground.

== Synopsis ==
The series follows a group of young lemmings living entirely by a lake within a vast Canadian forest, far from the human accessories, high-tech devices, and chocolate spread of the original ranger's cabin. The core narrative treats the natural environment as a massive playground as they explore it and use the natural elements around them to invent various activities with other animals.

Each episode is a self-contained adventure in which the characters must solve a difficulty or overcome an obstacle through play, experimentation, and cooperation as the baby lemmings run into everyday toddler-like conflicts or natural challenges, they use boundless creativity and cooperation to ensure every episode ends happily unlike the main series Grizzy & the Lemmings. Unlike the original series—which revolves around constant, explosive turf wars over a human cabin and usually ends in mutual defeat or a downer ending—the spin-off preschool series focuses on a cooperative world where the Canadian forest is a massive playground. Any challenge or conflict is resolved through creative, imaginative games, ensuring a happy ending.

== Production ==
Baby Lemmings was announced in September 2024, when HARI Studios commissioned its first preschool series aimed at preschoolers & families and a 78x7 preschool animated spin-off series to their globally popular series Grizzy & the Lemmings, entitled Baby Lemmings. The preschool animated spin-off series is produced by the studio behind the global hit series, HARI Studios, which handles pre-production, writing and storyboarding at its main Paris-based production studio; the animation production services for the spin-off series are provided at its Angoulême-based animation production facility, whom animate its main series Grizzy & the Lemmings. The creators of Grizzy & the Lemmings, Antoine Rodelet and Josselin Charier, would serve as the creators of the spin-off preschool series.
