= Charlotte de la Gournerie =

French film producer

- Born: January 15, 1989 (age 37); France
- Education: Gobelins, l'École de l'image
- Occupations: Producer, co-owner of Sun Creature
- Years active: 2012-present
- Known for: Oscar Nominated with Flee for Best Documentary Feature and Best Animated Feature

Charlotte de la Gournerie (born January 15, 1989) is a French film producer. She has been nominated for her film Flee for the Best Documentary Feature and Best Animated Feature at the 94th Academy Awards.

== Life and career ==
Charlotte was born in France and grew up in Bretagne, Bordeaux and Paris where she graduated, in 2013, from the Gobelins Animation School. She started her career at Animation Sans Frontières, a workshop supported by Creative Europe, then she moved to Denmark to work as a producer. In 2015, she became partner at Sun Creature Studio. In 2020, she started Sun Creature France in Bordeaux.

== Filmography ==
As Producer

- The Reward: Tales of Alethrion - The First Hero (2015)
- The Heroic Quest of the Valiant Prince Ivandoe (Season 1 - 2017)
- The Heroic Quest of the Valiant Prince Ivandoe (Season 2 - 2021)
- Flee (2021)

== Accolade(s) ==
Year	Film	Presenter/Festival	Award/Category	Status
2022	Flee	Oscars	Best Animated Feature; Best Documentary Feature	Nominated
2022	Flee	Roberts	Best Documentary Feature	Won
