= Cartoonito (Western Europe) =

- Country: Germany; United Kingdom
- Broadcast area: List: Angola; Cape Verde; Mozambique; Denmark; Faroe Islands; Finland; Iceland; Greenland; Norway; Portugal; Sweden
- Headquarters: Munich, Germany; London, United Kingdom

Programming
- Languages: Danish; Swedish; Norwegian; Portuguese; English
- Picture format: 1080i HDTV (downscaled to 16:9 576i for the SDTV feed)

Ownership
- Parent: Skydance Corporation
- Sister channels: List: 6'eren; Animal Planet; Canal 9; Cartoon Network; CNN International; Discovery Denmark; Discovery Finland; Discovery Sweden; Discovery Norway; Discovery Portugal; Eurosport 1; Eurosport 2; FEM; Frii; Food Network; Investigation Discovery; Kanal 4; Kanal 5; Kutonen; Kanal 5 Sweden; Kanal 9; Kanal 11 Sweden; REX; TLC Norway; TLC Portugal; TLC Sweden; Travel Channel International; TV5; TVNorge; VOX

History
- Launched: 15 January 2015; 11 years ago (as Boomerang Nordic); 11 September 2024; 2 years ago (as Cartoonito Western Europe)
- Former names: Boomerang (2015–23)

Cartoonito is a pan-European children's television channel owned by the EMEA sub-division of the international division of Warner Bros. Discovery. It launched on 11 September 2024, following the merger of Cartoonito Portugal and Cartoonito Nordic, which had been in operation since 2023.

== History ==
On 5 June 2005, Boomerang Europe was launched in English for all Europe, Middle East and Africa, including Portugal, Angola, Cape Verde and Mozambique. On 31 December 2013, the Pan-European feed was removed in Portugal due to the launch of the Portuguese feed of Cartoon Network. On 21 April 2015, Boomerang in European Portuguese was launched in Angola, Cape Verde and Mozambique as a partnership with DStv and it is available on the DStv Bué and DStv Grande packages. Later, it was launched in Portugal on 26 April 2018 and it is available with Vodafone and Nowo TV operators. The channel also became available on Meo on 2022.

Both Cartoonito Portugal and Cartoonito Nordic originated as blocks on Boomerang in 2022, before taking over the channel space in March and September 2023 respectively.

=== Nordic countries ===
On 19 January 2015, Boomerang Nordic applied the 2014–15 rebrand.

In January 2022, it was announced that a Cartoonito programming block would also come to Boomerang on 1 February 2022. Due to the channel changes from 17 April to 1 May 2023, the Czech Radio and Television Broadcasting Council also gave the green light to show the channel in Latvia.

Boomerang Nordic fully transformed into a 24/7 Cartoonito channel on 4 September 2023, along with its Turkey and MENA counterparts.

On 11 September 2024, the channel's feed merged with Cartoonito Portugal, forming Cartoonito Western Europe.

=== Portugal ===
On 21 February 2022, Cartoonito launched as a morning and afternoon block on Boomerang. Boomerang Portugal would become a 24/7 Cartoonito channel on 23 March 2023.

On 11 September 2024, the channel's feed merged with Cartoonito Nordic, forming Cartoonito Western Europe.

== Cartoonito in Spain ==
Cartoonito was launched as a 24-hour channel on 1 September 2011, replacing the Spanish version of Boomerang, as part of Turner Broadcasting System EMEA's plans to roll out the Cartoonito brand across Europe, the Middle East and Africa.

Turner Broadcasting System Europe announced on 14 June 2013 that Cartoonito and Cartoon Network would close in Spain on 30 June 2013, due to dwindling TV ratings and the pay TV crisis Spain had at that time as a consequence of the 2008 financial crisis.

== Programming ==
Sources:

- Batwheels
- Bugs Bunny Builders
- Dorothy and the Wizard of Oz
- Grizzy & the Lemmings
- Lu & the Bally Bunch
- Mr. Bean: The Animated Series
- Moley
- Mush-Mush & the Mushables
- The Tom and Jerry Show

== See also ==
- Cartoonito CEE
- The Cartoon Network, Inc.
