= Kosmos-TV =

Russian television operator

Kosmos-TV was a Russian MMDS television operator in the metropolitan area of Moscow. The service operated between 1991 and 2012.

== History ==
Kosmos-TV was created in 1991 by Metromedia International, an offspring of the former Metromedia conglomerate in former Communist states, who had previously arranged an agreement to distribute MTV Europe to Lencentel in Saint Petersburg, which was renamed from the former Leningrad at the end of the year.

Broadcasts of Kosmos-TV started in December 1991, at the time of the dissolution of the Soviet Union. It was a joint-venture between Metromedia's subsidiary ITI (International Telcell Inc.) and the Russian State TV and Radio Company «Ostankino» having 50% each. At the time of its launch, there were no pay-TV services in the Russian language, causing Kosmos-TV to concentrate on a niche market of foreigners, including elite Anglophone Russians. Alexander Lapshin was appointed president in 1992–1993 and again in 1995–1997. Lapshin's relationship with the company was far from amicable, due to issues between Metromedia and Ostankino. During Lapshin's absence, in 1994, Kosmos-TV was registered as a joint stock company. Talks had emerged in the summer of 1997 of the sale of Ostankino's assets in the operator, and that Metromedia representants said that Lapshin had renounced from his post on 24 June 1997.

The service transmitted its signals from the Ostankino Tower, spanning a range of 60 km. The service had provided 20 channels by 1996, among them BBC World, NBC Europe, MTV (scheduled to start stereo broadcasts in 1997), TNT & Cartoon Network, CMT Europe, Bloomberg TV, Euronews, Discovery Channel, Travel Channel, Eurosport, CNN International, NHK and two in-house movie channels: Noviy Kanal, airing Russian movies as far back as the Soviet age, from studios such as Mosfilm, Lenfilm and Forum, and Sezam, airing more recent movies translated to Russian, by means of a licensing agreement with VHS distributor Varus Video. Plans were being made to reach the 100 channel benchmark by 2000. In the first ten months of 1996 alone, about 8,000 new local subscribers joined, mostly because of BBC Prime.

A mixture of developments partly attributed to the 1998 Russian financial crisis saw Kosmos-TV reformat its activities to a more Russophone audience. A substantial amount of foreign subscribers left the service, owing to their exit from Russia, and new foreign companies began delivering services with Russian translation, such as Nickelodeon and Discovery.

On 17 November 2000, Kosmos-TV announced that it would start providing digital television services, planning to nearly double its number of channels from 31 to 60. The operator started a massive campaign to counter NTV-Plus, which saw a record number of subscriptions when the Ostankino Tower caught fire in September 2000, affecting Kosmos-TV for a 12-day period. The service was planned before the blaze hit the tower, initially scheduled for 1999 but delayed due to poor market conditions. Conversion started on 20 November and by early December it had claimed 1,000 subscribers.

In July 2003, Metromedia sold its 50% share in the service to offshore Adamant Advisory Services, who then sold its assets in Russia to AFK Sistema on 27 October 2003. In 2004, Kosmos-TV announced that it would start its service in regions other than Moscow.

In August 2011, Vladimir Yevtushenkov bought Kosmos-TV in order to later sell the frequencies to LTE operators. The provider sent a letter to its subscribers in August 2012 announcing the shutdown of operations on 1 September and the conversion of the frequencies to the LTE network. At closing time, Kosmos-TV had 35,000 subscribers, much smaller than the average number of pay television subscribers in Moscow at 4.8 million. Its subscribers moved to other providers.
