= Cartoon Network (Western Europe) =

Western European television channel

- Country: France; Germany; United Kingdom
- Broadcast area: List: Angola Austria Belgium Cape Verde France Germany Haiti Lebanon Liechtenstein Luxembourg Madagascar Mauritius Monaco Morocco Mozambique Netherlands Nordic countries Overseas France Portugal South Tyrol Sub-Saharan Africa Switzerland Lithuania
- Headquarters: Munich, Germany; Neuilly-sur-Seine, France; London, United Kingdom

Programming
- Language: List: Danish Dutch English French German Norwegian Portuguese Swedish
- Picture format: 576i (SDTV); 1080i (HDTV)

Ownership
- Owner: Skydance Corporation
- Sister channels: Boomerang France; Cartoonito France; Cartoonito CEE; Cartoonito WE; Warner TV

History
- Launched: 17 September 1993; 33 years ago (as Cartoon Network UK/Europe); 25 September 2024; 2 years ago (as Cartoon Network Western Europe)

Cartoon Network is a pan-European children's pay television channel owned by the EMEA sub-division of the international division of Skydance Corporation. The channel started broadcasting on 25 September 2024, as a result of the merger between the French, German, Dutch, Portuguese and Scandinavian feeds. A localization of the namesake American channel, it airs primarily in Western Europe along with other countries in the EMEA region and French-speaking territories.

== History ==
Cartoon Network Europe first launched on 17 September 1993. As part of a timesharing service with TNT Classic Movies. Although it was legally licensed in the UK, as it transmitted from London, the French and Belgian authorities objected to the American programming available in the French language. In June 1998, an autonomic Cartoon Network was launched for Southern Europe (France, Spain, and Italy). The Italian channel became independent a few months later, and on 23 August 1999, the French and Spanish channels were split.

Since 25 September 2024, Cartoon Network's European channels were gradually remerged into pan-regional feeds. In CEE, the Polish and RSEE feeds were brought under Cartoon Network CEE on 18 September 2024. On September 25, few days ago after relaunched to new Cartoon Network CEE, the new feed has been officially launched in Western Europe merging the Dutch, French, German, Scandinavian, and Portuguese feeds. At the moment, Cartoon Network's channels in the UK, Ireland, Turkey and Italy stayed separate. As of the same day, Cartoon Network's current slogan in Central and Eastern Europe and Western Europe since 2024 is: This is your Cartoon Network.

=== France ===
In 1999, all shows began to be shown in French. Cartoon Network broadcast mainly Hanna-Barbera and Warner Bros. cartoons in the early 2000s. In 2006, the channel changed its programming to aim a more modern audience by removing old shows. These shows were replaced with movies and some live-action series.

Starting in 2010, less Hanna-Barbera productions have been broadcast. Most of these were moved to sister network Boomerang. An original video game titled Cartoon Network: Punch Time Explosion XL was released on the Xbox 360 and Nintendo 3DS. In December 2012, Cartoon Network began to air the first seasons of Wakfu: The Animated Series. In early 2014, Turner announced the new series Uncle Grandpa, Steven Universe and Clarence.

Since 2014, Cartoon Network France has been available in Sub-Saharan Africa through StarTimes. On 25 July 2016, Cartoon Network France fully rebranded using graphics from the Check It 4.0 branding package. On 4 September 2017, Cartoon Network France fully rebranded using graphics from the Dimensional branding package.

On 25 September 2024, Cartoon Network France merged with German, Dutch, Portuguese and Scandinavian feeds.

=== Germany ===
Unlike the other Big Four countries in Western Europe, and even Spain, Germany did not receive a localized version of Cartoon Network during the 1990s. Instead, programming from Hanna-Barbera, Warner Bros. Animation and Cartoon Network Studios was licensed to the various free to air broadcasters in Germany, with later reruns happening on the German kids channel Junior during the 2000s, for shows such as Animaniacs and Underdog (TV series).

Kabel eins would launch a Cartoon Network themed Saturday morning programming block on 3 September 2005. In December 2013 Kabel eins cancelled the programming block, but its programming continues to be available on German terrestrial television through channels like Super RTL and even Disney Channel Germany.

In June 2006, a German version of Boomerang was launched; this was followed by the simultaneous launch of Cartoon Network Germany as a 24-hour channel and TCM on 5 December 2006. In December 2013 kabel eins cancelled the programming block. On 1 September 2016, Cartoon Network Germany re-branded using graphics from the Check It 4.0 branding package. The channel's broadcasts included other Germanic-speaking countries such as: Austria, Switzerland, Liechtenstein, South Tyrol in Italy, and Luxembourg.

On 25 September 2024, Cartoon Network Germany merged with the French, Dutch, Portuguese and Scandinavian feeds.

=== Netherlands and Flanders ===
The first incarnation of the Dutch feed launched on 12 July 1997. The first company that was confirmed to carry the service was Castel; as of March 1997, negotiations with other companies began. It primarily aired animated programming in the Netherlands and Belgium. This version was available in the Dutch and English languages and broadcast for 18 hours a day, from 6AM until midnight on Channel 25 on Digitenne. As of December 1997, 40% of households with cable had access to the channel.

Overnight in its first version, the channel relayed the British version, which according to the team, was cheaper. This included sign language programming, in British Sign Language, which received criticism from sign language associations. Cartoon Network justified that the post-10pm slot was "unfeasible" to feature a Dutch sign language interpreter.

The Dutch feed closed down on 1 August 2001, and was replaced by the pan-European feed with a Dutch audio track, yet some shows still aired in English with subtitles and all continuity was in English. It aired 16 hours a day, from 6AM until 10PM. The channel's airtime was shortened on 1 April 2003, now broadcasting from 6AM until 9PM. A new logo was introduced on 21 April 2006. On 25 April 2008, UPC added an English audiotrack to the channel; Ziggo would do the same in 2010. Shortly after the shutdown of the first incarnation of the Dutch feed, Yorin's block Yorkiddin' started airing selected CN shows as part of a one-hour block (Yorkiddin' presents Cartoon Network) from 5 November 2001.

On 17 November 2010, the Dutch feed relaunched, broadcasting 24 hours a day and featuring the 2010 on-air style. All programs and ads air in Dutch.

On 18 July 2018, Cartoon Network launched in HD on KPN, and Ziggo added HD signal on 3 December.

On 25 September 2024, Cartoon Network Netherlands merged with the German, French, Portuguese and Scandinavian feeds.

=== Nordic countries ===
Some programs on the pan-European feed were dubbed into Norwegian, Swedish and Danish, dubbed locally by companies such as SDI Media and Dubberman Denmark, for the Danish soundtrack. On December 16, 1996, Cartoon Network became a 24/7 channel, as did TNT. However, a version of the channel called TNT & Cartoon Network continued to appear on some providers in Europe. On 1 January 2000, a regional Scandinavian version of Cartoon Network was created, broadcasting in Danish, Swedish and Norwegian.

In mid-May 2006, the channel rebranded to the City era, with the logo, promos, bumpers and idents altered as well. The Boomerang block was removed but most of its program content still continued to be offered on the channel. In mid-May 2009, the branding was changed to the Arrow era as seen on other CN feeds in the EMEA region at the time. In early 2011, the channel rebranded to the Check It 1.0 era, with a new logo, bumpers and idents influenced by the Checkerboard era.

From 1 October 2012 onwards, there are local Swedish commercials on the Swedish subfeed's ad breaks as opposed to the pan-Nordic commercials aired in Denmark, Norway, Finland and Iceland. Since 1 November 2013, Cartoon Network has been broadcasting in widescreen. Although the channel airs 24/7, some distributors only broadcast the channel between 6:00 am and 9:00 pm, with Turner Classic Movies filling the remainder of the schedule. Distributors that only broadcast the partial version include Viasat, Telia Digital-tv and many smaller analogue cable systems. The channel is not yet available in Finnish in Finland, but some of the programs on the channel are available in Finnish on local Finnish channels such as MTV3, C More Juniori, Sub and Nelonen.

In November 2014, the channel rebranded to Check It 3.0, following various other EMEA feeds doing so. On April 2, 2016 Cartoon Network Nordic rebranded to the Check It 4.0 graphics package, marking the first major stage towards the rebrand rollout across the EMEA region. On May 1, 2017, the channel started broadcasting in Finland.

At the request of the Czech regulator, between NEPLP, from 17 April 2023, the channel starts broadcasting in Latvia, replacing the Southeastern European version, but completely on 1 May 2023. On 25 September 2024, Cartoon Network Scandinavia merged with the German, Dutch, Portuguese and French feeds.

=== Portugal ===
The Portuguese-language version of the channel started to broadcast their feed to Angola and Mozambique on 1 October 2013, coincidentally a few months after Cartoon Network in Spain closed.

On 3 December 2013, the Portuguese channel was officially launched in Portugal on all cable operators, switching from the Pan-European version (in English) at 20:00, broadcasting in 16:9. The Pan-European English feed was removed from the operator NOS service, along with other foreign language international channels on 1 February 2010, and the Portuguese-language Panda Biggs was included in its place.

When the Pan-European feed was still being broadcast, the daily broadcast was 15 hours (from 05:00 to 20:00) in Portugal. During that time, the channel shared time with TNT, focusing on classic movies and professional wrestling, and in its final years, with TCM. Some cable TV operators preferred dividing the two channels with their own channel (some with a description of their opening and closing times). Shortly after the release of Portugal's version of the channel, TCM and Boomerang stopped being aired in Portugal.

Around February 2014, the channel started airing advertisements, but in March 2014, they stopped airing them, returning in the middle of the month. Cartoon Network Portugal was also the first European CN feed to adopt the CHECK it 3.0 branding. From 30 May 2014 to 30 March 2017, Cartoon Network used white background graphics. On 31 March 2017, it changed its design to a version based on the US feed's Dimensional branding.

On 26 April 2018, Boomerang Portugal was launched on NOWO and Vodafone. This version had already been launched in Angola and Mozambique on 21 April 2015 and the European channel (English-language) stopped being broadcast when Cartoon Network was launched in Portuguese. The channel begun broadcasting in HD in 2022. Boomerang was later replaced by Cartoonito on March 23, 2023.

On 16 September 2024, Cartoon Network Portugal begun following the same schedule as Cartoon Network in the Nordics, France, Germany and the Netherlands. On September 25 the unification took a step further as the Portuguese feed was merged with the feeds mentioned above. From now on, these individual feeds have been phased out and the only difference between the broadcast in each country is an exclusive sub feed for local ad breaks.

== Cartoon Network in Spain ==
On 4 March 1994, (despite Turner announcing before the end of 1993) the sixth language of the channel was added: Spanish. Later, the channel was also added to Spanish cable networks. In 1997, Canal Satélite Digital signed an agreement with Time Warner in which, apart from obtaining rights from the production company, it also benefited from the entry of Cartoon Network and TNT in its offer.

Turner Broadcasting System Europe announced on 14 June 2013 that Cartoon Network and Cartoonito would close in Spain on 30 June 2013, due to dwindling TV ratings and the pay TV crisis Spain had at that time as a consequence of the 2008 financial crisis.

On 20 June, it was published on the blog of the Cartoon Network website the cessation of its television broadcasts, but noting that the website would remain active, with its content becoming available on demand (VOD) services for tablets, smartphones or televisions connected to the Internet in which viewers could watch the series and content of the channel. This would eventually lead to the creation of Time Warner's own online VOD service in Spain, HBO España in 2016 (which would become HBO Max in 2021, later on Max in 2024).

It was also explained that these contents would also be available on the channel's website, and that Turner would increase its presence on Boing, the children's channel which TBS España jointly owns with Mediaset España.

Shortly before midnight on 1 July 2013, the channel ceased broadcasting in Spain after 19 years, with the last programme to be aired being an episode of Star Wars: The Clone Wars. The channel then displayed a filler, and after a few minutes, each operator that distributed the signal replaced it with an information screen informing customers that the channel stopped broadcasting in Spain. However, the channel's website remained active until 21 November 2024, when it was discontinued and redirected to Max.

== Cartoon Network in Italy ==
After the launch of the pan-European Cartoon Network Europe feed, distributed from the United Kingdom, on 17 September 1993, the channel distributed a multilingnual feed to 34 European countries, among them Italy, from late 1994. In January 1996, Turner Broadcasting signed an agreement with Atena to transmit Cartoon Network to the Italian public through the Telepiù satellite package. Being the first digital satellite bouquet in Italy, the channel added an Italian audio track for part of the programming. The channel's official announcers are Andrea Piovan (from 1996 to 2004).

On 30 June 1996, a Cartoon Network-branded programming block was introduced on Telemontecarlo's second network, TMC2. It was an hour-long block (from 7:45pm) presented by Emanuela Panatta and Beppe Rispoli. The block was officially launched the following day, airing content from Hanna-Barbera's archives and, sometimes, from Warner Bros. Television and Metro-Goldwyn-Mayer. The block was also broadcast on Telemontecarlo in the morning, while on Sundays it aired a special edition in the afternoon. Cartoon Network Italy started broadcasting on 31 July 1996 on the Italian satellite pay TV platform TELE+ Digitale, and it later began available also on Stream TV's cable and satellite bouquet. Initially it broadcast 14 hours a day, timeshared with TNT, only with the English audio track available. In Switzerland, the channel was distributed by Cablecom Ticino.

In October 1997, Stream TV began distributing a 24/7 Italian-language feed of the channel, also making it available on Telepiù. By June 1998 it split off creating a unified Spanish, French and Italian Cartoon Network feed. The three versions were split into their own channels in August 1999. Its official website opened in April 2000. Following the buyout of Telemontecarlo to create the current La7, the Cartoon Network block returned from 2001 to 2004 under the new name Cartoon Network Week-end and later Cartoon CARTOON, presented by Panatta alone. On 31 July 2003, it became exclusively available on Sky Italia, born after the two previous pay TV providers merger. In 2004, Turner participated with Wind at the time of the launch of de service in Italy, sealing an agreement, the first in the world, to distribute Cartoon Network on mobile TV.

On 11 September 2006, like what happened to other versions of the channel abroad before, the channel rebranded to the City era along with a new logo. On 8 December 2008, the channel became available on Mediaset Premium, with the launch of the new Premium Fantasy package of kids channels. The arrival coincided with its special marathon for the tenth anniversary of The Powerpuff Girls, which was scheduled for the same day.

The channel rebranded again on 29 November 2010, to the CHECK it. era, with the new slogan Ce N'è., uniting it with the original American channel, this coincided with the Italian premiere of Ben 10: Ultimate Alien. On 28 November 2016, an HD feed began transmitting exclusively on Sky Italia. On 1 June 2018, the channel closed on Mediaset Premium. On 1 May 2020, the channel became available on Now, replacing Disney Channel following its closure.

On 15 December 2020, Cartoon Network SD feed closed (after being limited to Sky Go since March), becoming thus only available in HD. However, its +1 timeshift channel is still only available in SD. Following Sky's NowForTheKids initiative, some of its programs were available from 21 April 2022 also available in the Ukrainian language with dubs or subtitles on Now for Ukrainian refugee children who fled the country due to the war. In June, Cartoon Network finished a refurbishing project of green areas in Milan, Florence and Naples, respectively: the Gardin of Desires, the Cubattoli garden and the Viviani Park orchard. In occasion of the network's thirtieth anniversary, a special event was held in Rome on 27 December 2022.

In May 2025, Cartoon Network Italy’s website along with Boomerang’s were sunsetted with the domains pointing to their YouTube channels. The final announcers were Paolo Monesi, Lorenzo Scattorin from 2013 and Gianluca Iacono from 2016.

In November 2025, it was announced that as part of Sky Italia not renewing its carriage deal with Warner Bros. Discovery, Cartoon Network and Boomerang would shut down on 1 January 2026. On 13 December, it was announced that Sky had entered into negotiations with Warner Bros. Discovery, which would allow both networks to remain broadcasting.

== See also ==
- Cartoon Network CEE
- The Cartoon Network, Inc.
