= Telekids =

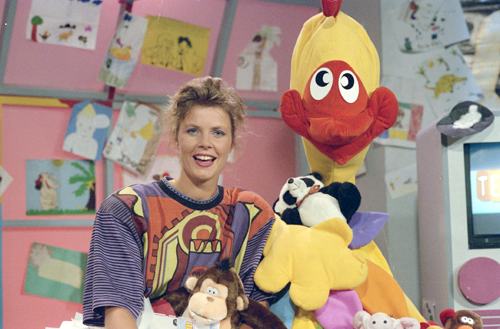
- Host Irene Moors in 1990
- Genre: Children's
- Presented by: Carlo Boszhard; Irene Moors
- Composers: John van Eijk; Carlo Boszhard
- Country of origin: Netherlands
- Original language: Dutch

Production
- Producer: Daphny Muriloff
- Production location: Netherlands
- Camera setup: Multi-camera
- Running time: 6 hours

Original release
- Network: RTL 4
- Release: 12 October 1989 – 2 October 1999

Telekids is a Dutch children's television programme showing on the RTL 4 channel from 1989 to 1999 and since 2010 on RTL 8.

The show first aired on 2 October 1989 at 6:25 pm, after the six o'clock news. Initially only Irene Moors presented the program and it was broadcast every day. To add even more strength, Carlo Boszhard joined in 1993, after which the program's popularity increased. From then on, Telekids was broadcast live every Saturday morning between 7 am and 12 noon. Later all cartoons were pushed back to the start, causing the studio program to start at 9 am. In the early days Telekids was co-hosted by Manon Thomas, Marc Postelmans and Caroline Tensen. These presenters filled in the absence of Moors. Telekids was also presented in its early years by Marcel de Nijs and Bart Bosch. They quickly disappeared, as presenter Anniko van Santen started presenting the weekday broadcasts of Telekids from 1992. After the weekday broadcasts were canceled, van Santen presented the Telekids-derived programs Cartoon Express (1993–1999) and Teleteens. When the broadcasting association Veronica joined RTL as a channel in 1995, Teleteens became NOW TV. This program aired on both Saturday and Sunday and was hosted by Danny Rook. Later, Now TV and all teen series moved to Veronica's own channel. During the same period, Rook did several live location items for Telekids on Saturday mornings.

The program was off the air between 1999 and 2010. On 19 August 2010 it was announced that Telekids would return to television, but on RTL 8. Since 18 October 2010, RTL Telekids can be seen every morning on RTL 8. On 3 September 2012 Telekids started its own digital channel (RTL Telekids), which can be received via Ziggo and Caiway.

== History ==
=== Classic Telekids ===
Telekids was broadcast from Luxembourg in the first season and later moved to the large studio in Hilversum. In the early years it was therefore a program that was broadcast daily, in which cartoons and live-action series (such as Transformers, Batman, The Raccoons, Little Wizards, Happy Days, My Secret Identity and Maple Town) were interspersed with studio segments. Such segments on weekdays weren't live, but were recorded on weekends. The 1000th broadcast of the program was broadcast in April 1992, with Boszhard having one of his first appearances. In the spring of 1993 Boszhard returned again, because he replaced Moors.

During the first season, longer movies for teenagers were broadcast. On one occasion the Czech movie The Firemen's Ball was broadcast by accident. The mistake was quickly identified but due to bad contact with the control room in Luxembourg, the movie was interrupted nearly one hour after it started.

Starting with the 1993–1994 television season, Telekids switched to the formula for which it became best known: cartoons alternated with the live studio segments of Boszhard and Moors every Saturday morning between 7 and 12 noon. Parts included Giegel and Goochel, the Mega Blubber Power Race, We are better, Spot Light, Girl Secrets and Carlo's Crisis. The broadcasts during the week, now presented by van Santen, were canceled. The Sunday morning was filled with many cartoons in the Cartoon Express, presented by van Santen. Around 11 o'clock the program turned into Teleteens in which films and series for teenagers were shown. Van Santen presented this program (which was similar to the Cartoon Express setup) as well. For a while there was also the Dino uur (Dino Hour) on Sunday mornings. It contained cartoons and series about dinosaurs. This hour was also presented by van Santen.

From September 1996, the cartoons were mainly placed in a block until 9 am, after which the studio slot started and was interrupted only once or twice by cartoons or series. More and more parts were added: Giegel and Goochel, for example, had their own quiz, Quizline, and the Mega Blubber Power Race became the Movie Race and further segments were added such as De Vliegende Ouwe Taart, Mrs. Zuurtje and Mrs. Pruimpje and Pittige Tijden (Spicy Times). The latter is a parody of Goede Tijden, Schlechte Tijden, performed by the two presenters and always with a guest (a well-known Dutchman, referred to in the program as De Vraag But Raak Gast). Pittige Tijden ensured that the audience that watched Telekids became much wider, the part was mainly popular among students.

When Boszhard and Moors just presented the program together, they pretended to be each other's lovers. Telekids songs hinted at their relationship. On 31 December 1994 an episode was even shown in which it was played that they married each other. As the seasons progressed, the public largely knew that Boszhard was gay and eventually revealed that Moors was pregnant with her actual boyfriend. The love affair of the duo therefore slowly faded into the background and turned into an ordinary friendship.

A number of CDs have also been released under the Telekids banner. The duo Carlo & Irene received a gold record in 1997 with a reissue of the Telekids CD from 1995 (with the hit single "Pittige Tijden"). Irene's earlier CDs from the solo era were also awarded; the 1992 CD Irene Moors en de Telekids received a gold record for 65,000 copies sold.

=== After Telekids ===
In 2000, after the classic version of Telekids ended, the brand was used for a morning block simply known as Telekids Cartoons. RTL 4 ended all children's programming with the launch of Yorin, moving and improving the output under the new name Yorkiddin' starting in October 2001, causing the cartoons to move there. By April 2005, the block was greatly reduced and when Yorin became RTL 7, the former Yorin output moved to RTL 5, which inherited the channel's children's output, being reduced to a handful of live-action series in the early afternoon.

=== Current Telekids ===
On 19 August 2010 RTL indicated that the name Telekids would be used for a new youth block on RTL 8.

Originally the new program was to start on 4 October 2010. However, three days before that, a collision took place on the A59 in which a woman and three children were killed on their way to Efteling, where recordings would take place for the program De Schatkamer, one of the new Telekids segments. Therefore, the start of Telekids was postponed for two weeks until 18 October 2010, out of respect for the victims.

Since 26 September 2011 Telekids has been running longer and is also broadcast in the afternoons (every Monday to Friday from 6:30 am to 5:00 pm and on weekends from 6:30 am to 5:00 pm). Since 3 September 2013 there is also a digital channel called Telekids 24/7.
