= Dubberman Denmark =

Danish dubbing company

- Industry: Dubbing
- Headquarters: Copenhagen, Denmark
- Key people: Anja Pajor
- Website: Official website

Dubberman Denmark is a Danish dubbing company based in Copenhagen, Denmark. It is a subsidiary of Dubberman.

== Clients ==
- Cartoon Network (Denmark)
- Disney Character Voices International
- Danmarks Radio
- TV 2 (Denmark)
