= Yorkiddin' =

Defunct programming block

- Network: Yorin
- Launched: 6 October 2001; 24 years ago
- Closed: July 2005; 21 years ago
- Country of origin: Netherlands
- Format: Children's programming
- Original language: Dutch

Yorkiddin was a programming block on Yorin from 2001 to 2005, which started upon its rebrand from Veronica.

It began on 6 October 2001, replacing the former Telekids. At launch, it mainly aired reruns of animated series previously shown on RTL 4 and virtually little new content. Its launch put it at a share of only 2.4 percent on weekends, ascending to between 3 and 4% on school days, which was far lower than the shares obtained by Kindernet, Zappelin and Fox Kids. The main programme was @Cindy, hosted by Cindy Pielstroom, airing on weekend mornings. @Cindy ended on 31 December 2002.

A multi-year agreement with Cartoon Network in October 2001 led to the creation of a daily one-hour Yorkiddin presents Cartoon Network strand from 5 November 2001. This enabled Cartoon Network to increase its visibility in the Netherlands, at a time when the channel was restricted to subscription packages.

In 2003, with the success of Beyblade, related competitions aired during the block (which aired the series) with further information available on its website. By then, the afternoon block was renamed Toonami and aired action cartoons and anime.

In October 2003, HMG announced a suspension and restructuring of the block from January. It was suggested that an aesthetic similar to Telekids was being thought of. HMG justified the decision in order to better compete with Fox Kids and Nickelodeon. Instead of returning with a new format in 2004, it was reduced to a morning block on weekends. The output was limited to European series, some American shows (Clifford the Big Red Dog, Underdog, etc.) and some anime.

In early 2005, children's programming on Yorin was greatly reduced, with Yorkiddin' being gradually replaced by infomercials. As of April, the strand was reduced to three series, down from seven in the previous month. By July, all the remaining series had left and Yorkiddin' ended; with the unbranded afternoon strand of live-action series remaining. With the corporate repositioning in 2005 and the content swap between Yorin - which became RTL 7 on 12 August - and RTL 5, these series moved accordingly.
