= Cartoon Network (France) =

Former French television channel

- Country: France
- Broadcast area: Nationwide; Belgium; Switzerland; Luxembourg; Monaco; Morocco; Lebanon; Madagascar; Mauritius; Overseas France; Haiti
- Headquarters: Neuilly-sur-Seine, France

Programming
- Languages: French; English (programs only, continuity was in French)
- Picture format: 576i (SDTV); 1080i (HDTV)

Ownership
- Owner: Warner Bros. Discovery EMEA
- Sister channels: Warner TV Next; Cartoonito; TCM Cinéma; Warner TV; TLC; Discovery Channel; Discovery Investigation; Boomerang

History
- Launched: 17 September 1993; 33 years ago (as part of Cartoon Network Europe); 23 August 1999; 27 years ago (as separate channel)
- Closed: 25 September 2024; 2 years ago
- Replaced by: Cartoon Network (Western Europe)

Availability

Terrestrial
- StarTimes: Channel 361

Cartoon Network was a French children's television channel, available for France, Belgium, Switzerland, Luxembourg and Francophone Africa. It was a localized version of the original U.S. subscription channel of the same name, and was launched on 23 August 1999, and owned by Warner Bros. Discovery International under its French division.

== History ==
In 1993 on the launched the day timesharing with TNT Classic Movies, in Europe. Although it was legally licensed in the UK, as it transmitted from London, the French and Belgian authorities objected to the American programming available in the French language. In June 1998, an autonomic Cartoon Network was launched for Southern Europe (France, Spain and Italy). The Italian channel became independent a few months after, and on 23 August 1999, the French and Spanish channels were split.

In 1999, all shows began to be shown in French. Cartoon Network broadcast mainly Hanna-Barbera and Warner Bros. cartoons in the early 2000s. In 2006, the channel changed its programming to aim a more modern audience by removing old shows. These shows were replaced with movies and some live-action series.

Starting in 2010, less Hanna-Barbera productions have been broadcast. Most of these were moved to sister network Boomerang. An original video game titled Cartoon Network: Punch Time Explosion XL was released on the Xbox 360 and Nintendo 3DS. In December 2012, Cartoon Network began to air the first seasons of Wakfu.

In early 2014, Turner Europe (now Warner Bros. Discovery EMEA) announced the new series Uncle Grandpa, Steven Universe and Clarence.

Between 2014 and 2024 (date of the merge), Cartoon Network France has been available in Sub-Saharan Africa through StarTimes.

On 25 July 2016, Cartoon Network France fully rebranded using graphics from the Check It 4.0 branding package. On 4 September 2017, Cartoon Network France fully rebranded using graphics from the Dimensional branding package.

In June 2024, HBO Max was launched in France, and the channel was made available through the service for all HBO Max subscribers. On 25 September 2024, Cartoon Network France merged with German, Dutch, Portuguese and Scandinavian feeds.

In November 2024, Canal+ has resumed the channel in its offerings, including in Africa and its overseas regions.

== Logos ==
Logo used from 23 August 1999 to 19 August 2006

Logo from 19 August 2006 to 1 December 2010

Logo from 1 December 2010 to 25 September 2024 (last logo before and after merger)
