= Boomerang (France) =

French children's television channel

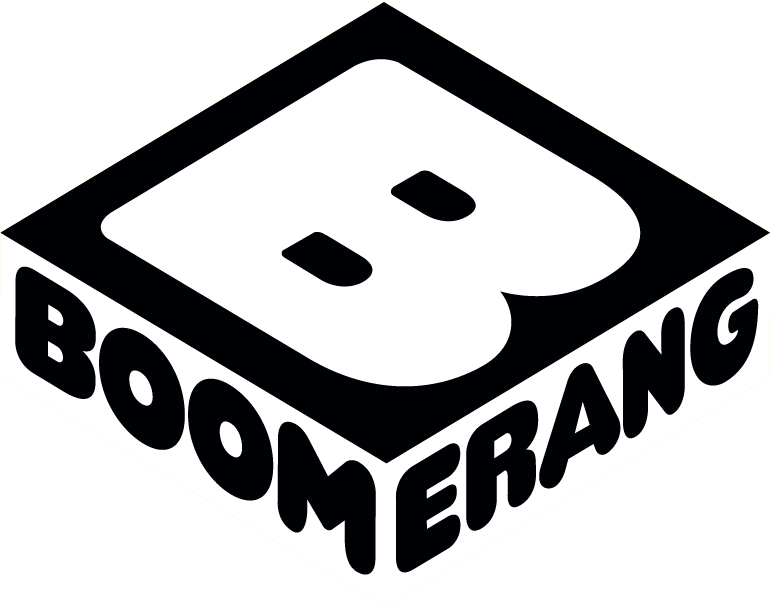
- Logo since 3 January 2015
- Country: France
- Broadcast area: Nationwide; Belgium; Switzerland; Monaco; Luxembourg; Morocco; Sub-Saharan Africa; Madagascar; Mauritius; Overseas France; Haiti

Programming
- Languages: French; English (continuity in French)
- Picture format: 16:9
- Timeshift service: Boomerang +1

Ownership
- Owner: Warner Bros. Discovery EMEA
- Parent: Skydance Corporation
- Sister channels: Cartoon Network; Cartoonito; TCM Cinéma; Warner TV; TLC; Warner TV Next; Discovery Investigation

History
- Launched: 23 April 2003; 23 years ago

Links
- Website: www.boomerangtv.fr

Availability

Terrestrial
- StarTimes: Channel 362

Boomerang is a French television channel which broadcast animated programs aimed at children. It is owned by Skydance Corporation under its EMEA and French divisions of the original namesake American channel.

== History ==
In early 2000s, Boomerang was a morning and a Monday evening block on Cartoon Network France.

The channel was launched on 23 April 2003 in TPS and cable providers.

On 23 February 2010, Boomerang +1 was launched on SFR. It joined Orange in January 2013, then on Free and Bouygues Telecom in August 2014, and finally on Numericable on 14 April 2016.

In 2010-2011, Boomerang switched its focus from classic programming to recent shows, taking away all cult licences from Cartoon Network (except Scooby-Doo! at the time). The channel took the slogan « la chaîne des personnages cultes du dessin animé », airing new shows such as Looney Tunes Show and The Garfield Show, and other shows for preschoolers.

Boomerang continued to carry classic shows (Looney Tunes, Tom and Jerry, The Pink Panther) on the Ça boom ! evening block. The block was completely pulled off on 3 July 2020.

Since September 2013, Boomerang broadcast in 16:9. Boomerang was launched in HD on 1 July 2015.

Following the launch of HBO Max in June 2024 in France, the channel was made available through the service for all HBO Max subscribers.

== Logos ==
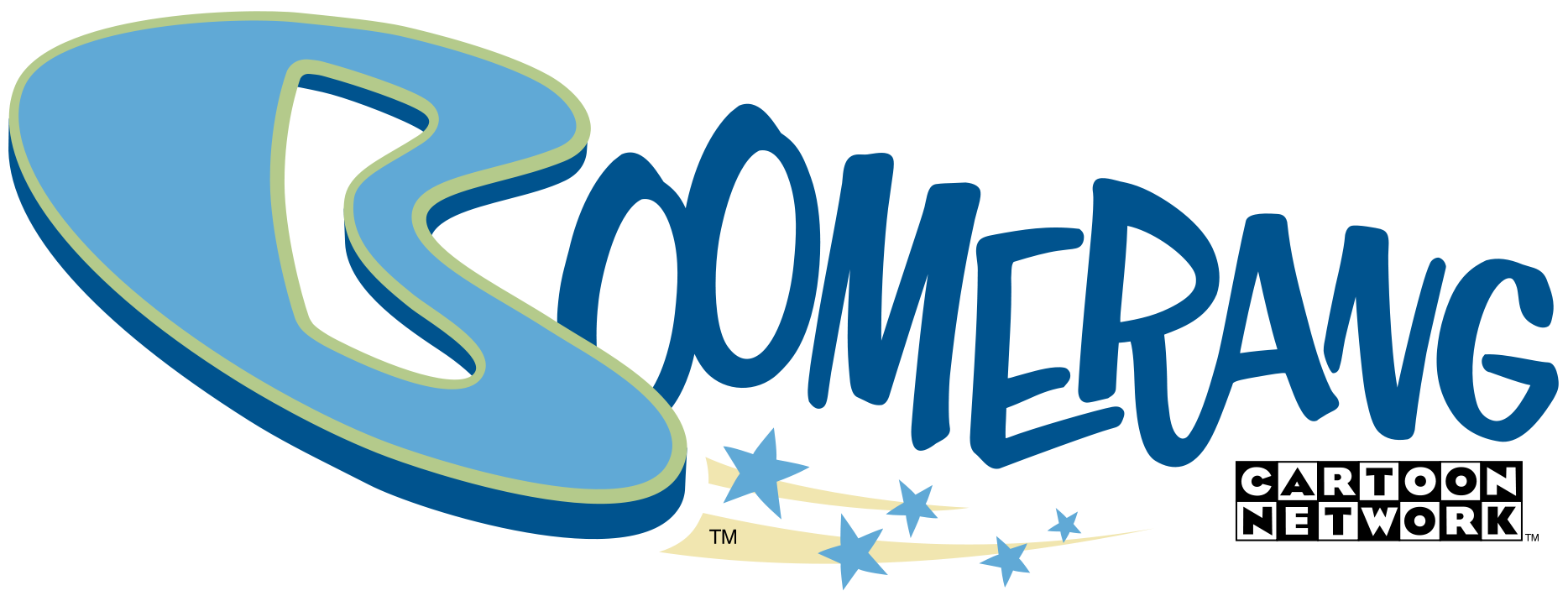
23 April 2003 – 16 April 2005

16 April 2005 – 3 January 2015

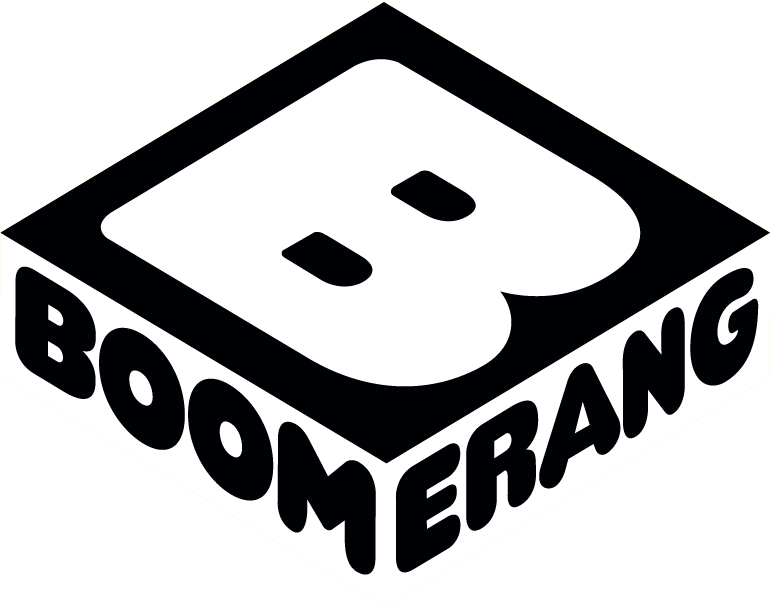
3 January 2015 – present
