= Metromedia International Group =

Radio and telecommunications company

Metromedia International is an offspring of the former larger Metromedia conglomerate that was set up to exploit radio stations, subscription television operators and telecommunications operators in former Communist countries in Eastern Europe, as well as most of the new countries that emerged after the fall of the Soviet Union. The company sold most of its assets in the mid-2000s, being limited to Magticom in the country of Georgia since 2006.

== History ==
John Kluge, the longtime mogul behind Metromedia, had sold his radio and television assets in 1986 (the company's TV assets were sold to News Corporation and WNEW-AM to another group) in order to concentrate on cellular telephony. In 1994, he announced his intent to return to the radio business, this time by buying radio stations in former Eastern Bloc countries, such as Russia and Hungary, which were owned by Carl Brazell, a former Metromedia entrepreneur. Metromedia had entered the radio market in 1993 in Hungary, with the creation of Radio Juventus, which eventually became the most popular commercial station in the country.

The new company went live on August 31, 1994, with the merger of Metromedia International Telecommunications, Actava Group Inc., Orion Pictures Corp. and MCEG Sterling Inc., who used its money to acquire its services. Actava's president and CEO, John D. Phillips, was appointed president, John Kluge was appointed chairman and Stuart Subotnick, vice chairman.

In March 1996, it won a license with local company Alina to operate Baltel, a GSM service in Latvia. In June, it announced the creation of a company to sell wireless phones in China. CEO Jack Philips resigned on December 4, announcing that he would pursue new business interests.

On March 3, 1997, it acquired Asian American Telecommunications Corp., which was a mixed-capital company aimed at building mobile telephony infrastructure in China. The Baltel network, for which Metromedia gained a license in the previous year, went operational in the same month. The company's lost US$200 million between 1995 and 1997 and had its stock dropped from 14 to 10.
