= Adult Swim (UK & Ireland) =

Television network in the UK and Ireland

- Network: Bravo (2006–2008); FX (2010); TCM2 (2012–2013); Fox (2015–2017); TruTV (2016); E4 (2019–2025); Channel 4 (2019); E4 Extra (2022–2025)
- Launched: 8 July 2006 (original launch); 10 September 2015 (first relaunch); 15 February 2019 (second relaunch)
- Closed: August 2013 (original launch); 1 September 2017 (first relaunch); 13 October 2025 (second relaunch)
- Country of origin: United Kingdom; Ireland
- Headquarters: London, England, United Kingdom
- Format: 576i (SDTV 16:9); 1080i (HDTV 16:9)
- Official website: http://www.adultswim.co.uk

Adult Swim was a British late night programming block which has sporadically aired on various channels in the United Kingdom and Ireland since 2006. Until 2025, Adult Swim programmes were broadcast on E4, E4 Extra and available for streaming on the Channel 4 streaming service.

The block first launched on 8 July 2006 before closing in August 2013. It was later relaunched on 10 September 2015 before closing again on 1 September 2017. The block was later relaunched for the second time on 15 February 2019 on E4 and E4 Extra until 13 October 2025.

In addition, Adult Swim also maintains a website and a mobile TV service which are run separately from its sister channel, Cartoon Network, unlike its American counterpart.

== History ==
Adult Swim is an American channel block that airs on the United States cable network Cartoon Network after the watershed, and features a mix of original and syndicated programming geared towards an adult audience. A Canadian version was launched as the late night counterpart to Cartoon Network Canada in 2012.

Some early Adult Swim programmes, notably Space Ghost Coast to Coast, appeared on Cartoon Network UK, predominantly in the late-90s evening block "AKA Cartoon Network" alongside older-skewing CN fare and UK productions such as Cult Toons; however, for Adult Swim's more edgy shows which followed, alternative homes had to be found.

Around 2002 - 2003, some Adult Swim shows were showing on the shortly-lived sister channel for Cartoon Network named CNX. The broadcasting of the shows ended after CNX was rebranded to Toonami.

Many of Adult Swim's original programmes have been aired in the UK on channels aimed at older audiences, having either been sold individually or as part of designated AS program blocks.

In the past, such blocks have aired on Bravo, TCM 2, FX (later Fox), and Comedy Central.

In June 2010, Turner Broadcasting had announced that they signed a deal with Adult Swim to debut on FX UK, and the block debuted at 10pm on 5 June 2010. Around Late 2010, Tim and Eric Awesome Show, Great Job! was sold to 4Music.

In January 2012, Adult Swim began a one-hour weekly broadcast on Turner's TCM 2 channel, marking the first time that Adult Swim has aired on one of Turner's own channels in the UK and Ireland. The programming block ended in August 2013, due to the closure of TCM 2.

Adult Swim returned to UK and Irish television with a new block on Fox starting 10 September 2015 at 23:00. In late 2016, the Fox block began airing on Thursday nights between midnight and 01:00. During late 2016 this ran concurrently with a Friday-night block on truTV, then owned by Turner, making several series available to Freeview users. The TRUTV block stopped at the end of 2016, Turner selling the channel to Sony Pictures Television in early 2017. The AS programming block ceased on Fox on 1 September 2017. Following the demise of the Fox and truTV blocks, Rick and Morty was sold to Comedy Central UK, which premiered the show's third season in the UK, and Netflix.

It was announced in January 2019 that Channel 4 had partnered with Adult Swim to introduce a new one-hour Adult Swim programming block would be introduced on E4 from February 2019. It was also revealed that Channel 4 would air numerous episodes of AS content on its online streaming and catch-up platform, All 4 as well as exclusively airing the upcoming fourth season of Rick and Morty on Channel 4. On 1 February, it was announced that Adult Swim would be coming to E4 on 15 February. It teased shows like Aqua Teen Hunger Force, Mr. Pickles, Rick and Morty, Robot Chicken, and more. On 15 February 2019, E4 started airing the Adult Swim programming block by airing Rick and Morty Season 1 and the Robot Chicken Walking Dead Special: Look Who's Walking. The next week, they replaced the Robot Chicken Walking Dead Special: Look Who's Walking.

On 8 March 2019, E4 started airing Season 2 of Dream Corp LLC, replacing the second episode of Robot Chicken Season 9 that aired on the Adult Swim programming block.

On 27 April 2019, E4 started airing Season 2 of Rick and Morty.

On 3 May 2019, E4 started airing the Adult Swim programming block, Fridays on early mornings. The early morning block airs the previous episode of Rick and Morty Season 2 and two episodes of Robot Chicken Season 8. The late night block airs the next episode of Rick and Morty Season 2, Robot Chicken Season 9, Dream Corp LLC Season 2 and Rick and Morty Season 1. On the same day, Samurai Jack came to All 4. The Robot Chicken: Star Wars special aired on E4 on 4 May 2019 at midnight. From June 2019, The Eric Andre Show replaced Dream Corp LLC in the E4 block.

On 15 May 2019, it was announced at the WarnerMedia Upfront 2019 that Season 4 of Rick and Morty would premiere in November 2019.

Following the expiration of its broadcasting and streaming agreement with Channel 4 in October 2025, Adult Swim programming was removed from the broadcaster’s linear channels and streaming platforms in the United Kingdom. The decision came after Warner Bros. Discovery, the parent company of Adult Swim, opted not to renew the partnership as part of a wider strategy to consolidate its content ahead of the expansion of its dedicated streaming services in the UK.

As a result, several Adult Swim titles, including Rick and Morty, were removed from Channel 4’s on-demand catalogue. The move was intended to prepare for the addition of Adult Swim programming to Warner Bros. Discovery’s own UK streaming service HBO Max, allowing the company to centralise distribution of its animated and adult-oriented content under one service.

== Online & DVD ==
The Adult Swim website, like its American counterpart, offers free access to full episodes of shows including Squidbillies, Harvey Birdman, Attorney at Law, Tom Goes to the Mayor, Minoriteam, Stroker & Hoop, Moral Orel, 12 oz. Mouse, Perfect Hair Forever, Metalocalypse, and Frisky Dingo. As of Wednesday 11 July 2012, the UK site started redirecting visitors to the U.S site. It has since been redesigned, showing a clip of Rick and Morty via YouTube, their social media sites, and their TV guide for the UK blocks.

Revolver Entertainment recently began distributing some original Adult Swim series on DVD in the UK and Ireland.

== See also ==
- Adult Swim
- Adult Swim (Canadian TV channel)
- Adult Swim (Australian TV programming block)
