= Cartoon Network Too =

British television channel (2006–2014)

- Country: United Kingdom; Ireland
- Broadcast area: United Kingdom, Ireland and Malta
- Headquarters: Turner House, Great Marlborough Street, London, United Kingdom

Programming
- Language: English
- Picture format: 576i (16:9/4:3) (SDTV)

Ownership
- Owner: Turner Broadcasting System Europe (Time Warner)
- Sister channels: Cartoon Network; Boomerang; Cartoonito; Turner Classic Movies; CNN International

History
- Launched: 24 April 2006; 20 years ago (original); 24 May 2007; 19 years ago (relaunch)
- Replaced: Toonami (relaunch)
- Closed: 23 May 2007; 19 years ago (original); 1 April 2014; 12 years ago (relaunch)
- Replaced by: Cartoonito (original); Cartoon Network +1 (relaunch)

Links
- Website: CNToo.co.uk (closed)

Cartoon Network Too (also known as CN Too) was a British television channel that was owned by Turner Broadcasting System Europe. CN Too was the sister station of Cartoon Network, and it aired older programmes that previously aired on the main Cartoon Network. Cartoon Network Too closed on 1 April 2014, and was replaced by the relaunch of Cartoon Network's one-hour timeshift channel.

== History ==
=== 2006–2007: Launch and early years ===
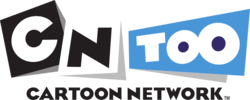
Original logo from launch to 2012

The channel was announced in November 2005, as part of a bid to increase Turner's penetration in the British children's television market, countering the increase in CBeebies' ratings and the launch of the CITV channel in March 2006, by targeting audiences aged four to nine. The launch of Cartoon Network Too enabled the main Cartoon Network channel to focus on new programming. Turner began negotiations with pay television companies in January 2006, with a launch scheduled in the fourth quarter of 2006. Meanwhile, a branding was created for the channel, as well as a marketing campaign. The campaign had a ranking of the ten favourite celebrity fathers from a survey conducted by 3,000 British mothers, which was won by Gordon Ramsay. Other celebrities in the list included Jonathan Ross, Jamie Oliver, Bob Geldof, and future Prime Ministers David Cameron and then-chancellor Gordon Brown. (Note: The full list was as follows: 1: Gordon Ramsay; 2: Jonathan Ross; 3: Bob Geldof; 4: Jamie Oliver; 5: David Cameron; 6: David Beckham; 7: Richard Madeley; 8: Andrew Flintoff; 9: Chris Martin; 10: Gordon Brown.)

On 24 April 2006, Cartoon Network Too was launched on Sky on channel 622. It also became available on SCTV Digital when that service launched in 2006, along with Cartoon Network and Boomerang. The channel aired from 3:00AM to 7:00PM and originally timeshared with TCM 2, from TCM.

During its early months, Cartoon Network Too mainly broadcast older shows from Cartoon Network's library, such as Dexter's Laboratory, The Powerpuff Girls, Johnny Bravo, Wacky Races, and Cow and Chicken, alongside then-currently-running shows on the network including Ed, Edd n Eddy, The Cramp Twins, and Courage the Cowardly Dog.

After this period, the channel transitioned to a "Modern-Classics" format, airing many then-currently-running Cartoon Network shows alongside programmes airing on Boomerang, and occasional older programming.

=== Introduction of Cartoonito block ===
On 4 September 2006, the Cartoonito programming block was launched, which aired on nine of Cartoon Network Too's programming hours from 6:00AM until 3:00PM. Cartoon Network Too's airtime remained 3:00AM to 7:00PM, however the actual programming from Cartoon Network Too only aired in the mornings from 3:00AM until 6:00AM and then in the afternoons from 3:00PM until 7:00PM, as the remaining hours contained Cartoonito's programming.

=== 2007–2012: Relaunch and merger with Toonami ===
On 2 May 2007, Turner announced that Cartoon Network Too would be expanded to a full 24-hour channel beginning on 24 May and merge with Toonami, which moved to its slot. This allowed the channel to begin broadcasting on Virgin Media in addition to Sky, as well as to allow a standalone Cartoonito channel to launch in the channel's original slot on Sky. To prepare for the merger, viewers were given three weeks of notice.

On 23 May 2007 at 7:00PM, the original version of Cartoon Network Too closed. Then, in the early hours of 24 May 2007, at 3:00AM, Toonami shut down and Cartoon Network Too was moved into its slot, while the standalone Cartoonito channel launched in Cartoon Network Too's original timeshared-with-TCM2 slot.

In June 2007, Cartoon Network Too became available on Top Up TV Anytime, which was a video-on-demand service. However, in June 2009, it was removed, but Cartoon Network continued to be accessible on Top Up TV Anytime. In June 2010, Cartoon Network Too was removed from SCTV Digital as a result of that service going into administration.

=== 2012–2014: Relaunch as an action-focused channel ===
In May 2012, Cartoon Network Too's logo was changed in line with the updated main logo of Cartoon Network, and transitioned its programming to a more male-focused audience, with a focus on action-adventure programming such as Ben 10: Alien Force and Star Wars: The Clone Wars. The channel also began to be verbally referred to as CN Too. During overnight hours, usually from 12:00AM until 6:00AM, it aired some of Cartoon Network's lesser-known original and acquired programming (including Skatoony).

=== 2014: Closure ===
On 1 April 2014, Cartoon Network Too was shut down, the final programme on Cartoon Network Too was the Skatoony episode "Halloween", followed by promos of what was airing on Cartoon Network, then a bumper following into a clip of Cartoon Network's promotional content from 2007, which was shown incomplete as Cartoon Network +1 was relaunched into Cartoon Network Too's channel space.
