= Toonami (United Kingdom and Ireland) =

UK children's TV channel

- Logo used from 2004 to 2006

Ownership
- Owner: Turner Broadcasting System Europe (Time Warner)
- Sister channels: Cartoon Network; Boomerang; Cartoon Network Too; TCM

History
- Launched: 18 December 2000; 25 years ago (as Cartoon Network programming block); 14 October 2002; 24 years ago (as CNX); 8 September 2003; 23 years ago (as Toonami)
- Closed: 8 September 2003; 23 years ago (as CNX); 24 May 2007; 19 years ago
- Replaced by: Cartoon Network Too (relaunched version)
- Former names: CNX (2002–03)

Links
- Website: www.toonami.co.uk (closed)

Toonami was a British children's channel operated by Turner Broadcasting System Europe in the UK and Ireland. It initially launched as the action oriented CNX on 14 October 2002, geared towards a more mature audience, before being rebranded as Toonami, named after the programming block of the same name, on 8 September 2003. Toonami was originally a programming block on Cartoon Network from December 2000 to June 2002.

== History ==
=== As programming block on Cartoon Network ===
In March 2000, Cartoon Network started to introduce anime programming on its schedules, starting with Dragon Ball Z. Batman Beyond (known as Batman of the Future in the UK), premiered on 4 September 2000, being scheduled alongside Dragon Ball Z. This would later become part of a programming block on the channel which eventually became Toonami on 18 December 2000. Throughout its time on Cartoon Network, Toonami introduced more programming including Tenchi Muyo! and Mobile Suit Gundam Wing. Toonami on Cartoon Network would seize broadcasting in June 2002 to make way for a spin-off channel based upon Toonami's high viewership on the channel.

=== As CNX ===
CNX logo

On 24 September 2002, Turner Broadcasting System Europe announced that it would launch a new offshoot network named CNX on 14 October. CNX would be the first Cartoon Network derivative to launch outside North America. The channel was initially available on Sky Digital and NTL:home.

Unlike Turner's other children's networks, CNX was classified as a general entertainment network aimed towards a 16-34-year-old male audience. CNX's daytime slot mainly consisted of action shows from Cartoon Network's lineup such as Batman of the Future, X-Men Evolution, Dragon Ball Z and Samurai Jack, alongside a magazine series entitled Trailer Park which featured the latest video games, media, extreme sports content and other media. CNX's nighttime slot mainly consisted of adult-oriented animation (mainly original shows from Adult Swim), martial arts movies, and dramas such as The Shield, Birds of Prey, Sports Illustrated Swimsuit Issue, Space Ghost Coast to Coast and Cowboy Bebop, while films included Point of No Return (1993), and Death Race 2000 (1975).

To promote CNX, six people attempted to break the world record for continuous TV watching, set at 46 hours, 30 minutes, and 50.91 seconds. Three participants—Steven Hayes, Adam King, and Nick Tungett—succeeded, watching for 47 hours. They earned a place in the 2002 Guinness World Records, a £5,000 cash prize, and £2,000 in audio-visual equipment.

Following the channel's launch, Turner was in negotiations with Telewest to add the channel to their Active Digital cable service, and it was soon added on 15 January 2003. In April, Turner Broadcasting System had considered launching a U.S version of CNX, but Mark Lazarus, the former head of Turner Entertainment, stated such a launch was "not imminent", and never materialised.

While the daytime slot was initially branded under the CNX banner, by 2003, it was rebranded under the Toonami name, while the CNX brand remained for the evening. This would soon prove to become the channel's most popular strand.

=== As Toonami ===
On 9 July 2003, Turner announced that CNX would close and rebrand as a standalone Toonami channel beginning in September 2003, with a Turner spokesperson citing that the adult market was "crowded and competitive" as the reason for its closure.

On September 1, it was officially revealed that CNX would rebrand as Toonami on September 8, and on that day, CNX closed for the final time at 1 am and its slot on all platforms was moved to the "Kids" sections and relabeled as Toonami, which launched at 6 am on that day.

The new version of Toonami would air much of the same programmes as before, with new additions including Ultimate Muscle and Star Wars: Clone Wars.

TOM returned as the channel's mascot, appearing as TOM 2, and was voiced by Christian Stevenson, otherwise known as DJ BBQ. Stevenson earlier hosted the CNX show Trailer Park alongside Ed Leigh. Previously, when Toonami was still a block on Cartoon Network UK, the block used TOM 1 and had a voice similar to Tansit from Space Ghost Coast to Coast narrating in its bumpers, which many fans believed to be TOM's voice.

In 2005, Toonami was added to the TV and video on demand kids' package for VNL's HomeChoice (now TalkTalk TV). Broadcasting for the channel involved using advanced MPEG-4 AVC compression technology, the first TV channel in the world to do so.

=== Refocus on Live Action shows ===
In February 2006, Turner Broadcasting System Europe announced that Toonami would receive a new refreshed look on 6 March and would be restructured as a general entertainment network to broaden its appeal. As such, the channel's slot on Sky Digital was moved to 602 (next to Cartoon Network), and being the first Turner-owned children's network to air live-action shows. The new graphics package would see the stark, simplistic black, white, and red logos replaced with blue, as well as the introduction of giggling, blob-like mascots that populated the channel's bumpers and idents.

Toonami favourites such as The Batman, Pokémon, Justice League, Teen Titans and Static Shock remained in the channel's schedule, mixed-in with new live-action shows such as Backyard Science, Blue Water High, Life with Derek, Parker Lewis Can't Lose and Stencil.

Following the rebranding, Turner announced plans to add live-action programmes to their other channels across the world, with the Latin American version of Boomerang being rebranded similarly as a general entertainment youth network, but unlike Toonami UK, it would be more focused towards a female market.

=== Merger with Cartoon Network Too ===
On 2 May 2007, Turner announced that Toonami would cease operations on 24 May and its EPG slot would be taken over by Cartoon Network Too. This was to allow a full-time Cartoonito channel to launch in Cartoon Network Too's original slot on Sky. On May 24, Toonami ceased operations at 3:00 am and Cartoon Network Too moved into the space shortly afterwards. Since its closure, the action animated programming were moved to Cartoon Network Too, as well as few of the live-action programming were moved to Boomerang the following year.

== Idents ==
When the channel launched in 2003, the idents would be the Toonami logo in the Sensor Room, or TOM 2's face, with a voice whispering Toonami. There were also bumpers in the Sensor Room showcasing the latest games, movies, and shows, with TOM displaying the awkward and dorky personality he was known for on the US Toonami. SARA was also in these bumpers, serving as the straight man to TOM's excited demeanor.

Toonami rebranded in 2004 and got rid of TOM and SARA. The idents were on a pale cyan background (alike Cartoonito's) and were based on CNX's idents. They had a black rectangle with red sides filling up with white before the white part turned into the Toonami logo. In 2005, five new idents were introduced, which focusing on a cube that explodes into a splash of colour into various 2D or 3D shapes/objects before the Toonami logo is forming.

In 2006, Toonami rebranded for the final time using the logo in an azure background and colored monsters called the "Cecils", which would play with the Toonami logo. The shutdown ident in promos and on the website was the Toonami logo, with the "Too" part pushing away the "nami" and the logo changing into the Cartoon Network Too logo on the same background from the 2004 idents.

== Programming ==
From 2000 to 2007, Toonami/CNX aired various programming. CNX introduced more shows that aren’t within Toonami's target demographic, including crime dramas, martial arts and Adult Swim programming.

(C) indicates shows which exclusively aired on CNX and were not carried over to Toonami following the rebrand.

Programming Block on Cartoon Network (until June 2002)

- Batman Beyond
- Dragon Ball
- Dragon Ball GT
- Dragon Ball Z
- Mobile Suit Gundam Wing
- The Real Adventures of Jonny Quest
- Tenchi in Tokyo
- Tenchi Muyo!
- Tenchi Universe
- X-Men: Evolution

CNX and Toonami channel

- AAA Movies (C)
- Aqua Teen Hunger Force (C)
- Backyard Science
- Batman Beyond
- Battle B-Daman
- Beyblade
- Birds of Prey (C)
- Boomtown (C)
- Blue Water High
- Code Lyoko
- Cowboy Bebop (C)
- Cubix
- Cybersix
- Dragon Ball
- Dragon Ball GT
- Dragon Ball Z
- Duel Masters
- Harvey Birdman, Attorney At Law (C)
- Hangin' with Mr. Cooper
- He-Man and the Masters of the Universe
- Home Movies (C)
- Justice League
- Justice League Unlimited
- Kong: The Animated Series
- Kung Fu (C)
- Life with Derek
- Loonatics Unleashed
- Medabots
- Megas XLR
- Monster Rancher
- One Piece
- Outlaw Star
- Parker Lewis Can't Lose
- Pokémon
- Pokémon Chronicles
- Rave Master
- Samurai Jack
- Star Wars: Clone Wars
- Sealab 2021 (C)
- Static Shock
- Sports Illustrated: Swimsuit Issue (C)
- Space Ghost Coast to Coast (C)
- Stencil
- Teen Titans
- The Batman
- The Brak Show (C)
- The Big O
- The Ripping Friends (C)
- The Shield (C)
- Todd McFarlane's Spawn (C)
- Trailer Park (C)
- Transformers: Energon
- Transformers Cybertron
- Ultimate Muscle
- X-Men: Evolution

== See also ==
- Cartoon Network (United Kingdom and Ireland)
- Cartoonito (UK and Ireland)
- Cartoon Network Too
- Adult Swim (UK & Ireland)
