= Skatoony =

2006–2008; 2010–2013 game show TV series

- Also known as: SkatoonY
- Genre: Game show Sitcom
- Created by: James Fox; Brian Boyle
- Developed by: Richard Brookes; James Fox
- Written by: UK: James Fox, Richard Brookes, Andrew Viner, and Dave King; NA: Laurie Elliott
- Story by: Richard Brookes and James Fox (UK version)
- Directed by: UK:James Fox (animation), and John A. Marley (live-action); NA: Michael Goldsmith (animation), and Dave Pearce (live-action)
- Presented by: UK: Rupert Degas and Lewis Macleod; NA: Jonathan Wilson and James Rankin
- Voices of: UK: Rupert Degas and Lewis Macleod; NA: Jonathan Wilson, James Rankin, and Jeff Lumby
- Theme music composer: Oliver Davis
- Opening theme: "Skatoony"
- Ending theme: "Skatoony" (Instrumental)
- Composers: Bungalow 7 Productions; Glenn Barna (additional music)
- Country of origin: United Kingdom; Canada
- Original language: English
- No. of seasons: 3
- No. of episodes: 39 (list of episodes)

Production
- Executive producers: James Fox; UK: Annie Miles (for Talent TV Ltd.), and Finn Arnesen (for Cartoon Network Europe); NA: Mark J.W. Bishop and Matthew Hornburg (for Marblemedia); Athena Georgaklis, Travis Williams and Alan Gregg (for Teletoon)
- Producers: UK: Matt West, Kevin Narrainen, and James Fox; NA: Susan Edwards (TV series)
- Production locations: UK: Camden and London; NA: Toronto (English version), and Montreal (French version); UAE:Abu Dhabi; DE: Erfurt; HIN: Noida
- Cinematography: Kevin C. W. Wong (NA version)
- Editors: UK: Kevin Narrainen; NA: Andrew Gurney (Season 1&3), and Michael Pierro (Season 2–3)
- Running time: 22 minutes
- Production companies: UK: Talent TV and Cartoon Network Europe; NA:MarbleMedia; UAE:Blink StudiosHIN: Miditech StudiosDE:Family Entertainment TV

Original release
- Network: Cartoon Network UK
- Release: October 6, 2006 – November 20, 2008
- Network: Cartoon Network (Australia and New Zealand); Teletoon/Télétoon
- Release: October 28, 2010 – April 14, 2013

Skatoony (stylized as SKAToonY) is a British/Canadian children's live action/animated game show television series. This show airs on Cartoon Network in the UK and on Teletoon in Canada. It is based around two hosts named 'Chudd Chudders' (voiced by Rupert Degas in the UK, and Jonathan Wilson in CA) and 'The Earl' (voiced by Lewis MacLeod in the UK, and James Rankin in CA). The series aired on Cartoon Network UK in 2006, with new episodes airing every Friday until the series' cancellation in 2008. Reruns continued to air on Cartoon Network until 2017. Skatoony has also aired as reruns in the UK on Boomerang and Cartoon Network Too until the channel itself closed down in 2014. The show aired on Starz Kids & Family in the U.S. until 2019. Reruns were occasionally shown on Teletoon in Canada until August 5, 2017. It also aired on Boomerang in Australia and New Zealand.

The show is hosted by 'Chudd Chudders' (voiced by Rupert Degas in the UK and Jonathan Wilson in North America) and 'The Earl' (voiced by Lewis MacLeod in the UK and James Rankin in North America). In the UK version, Chudd and Earl have American-Canadian accents sounding similar to themselves in the North American version.

== History ==
Skatoony began as a competition microsite on the Cartoon Network UK website in 2001, co-developed by James Fox and Brian Boyle; the latter left Cartoon Network before the series premiered. In 2006, the first full-length Skatoony TV show premiered on Cartoon Network. However, a few phone-in shows such as Skatoony Quizmas, Ready Steady Skatoony and Skatoony Truckatoony existed before as a sort of continuity during school holidays. These phone-in shows ended in 2005. The UK version of Skatoony was filmed at MTV Studios at Camden and in London with schoolchildren from around the world auditioning as contestants.

According to creator James Fox, the process of producing a Skatoony episode was very complicated and developed over all of the series.

First we’d plan out an episode and part script it. Then we’d take that to the studio and record the quiz element, weaving the script into conversation with the kids using “stand-in” actors instead of cartoons. We created slime and grunge out of various pastes, mostly wallpaper paste! Then we’d take the footage back to the animation studio and build the show from the original script and the live action footage.

On February 9, 2009, Marblemedia announced they would be producing a North American version of the series Skatoony (in English and French). The Canadian adaptation, titled Skatoony North America to differentiate it from other adaptations follows the same format. The North American version of Skatoony was filmed in Toronto, while the French version was filmed in Montreal with a different set of contestants; however, the outcome of the animated contestants remains the same between both versions. Jonathan Wilson voices Chudd Chudders while James Rankin provides the voice of The Earl and new addition to the Northern American release, a NA replacement for Skatoony boss Tony Eagle-Eyes (also voiced by Degas imitating Jimmy Durante) named Charles La Puck, voiced by Jeff Lumby.

A Middle Eastern adaptation of Skatoony debuted on April 5, 2011, on Cartoon Network Arabic. A Hindi adaptation aired some time in 2008, on Pogo. Original Skatoony creator James Fox served as executive producer for all Skatoony releases (except for the UAE release where James Fox was credited as a consultant producer) and met every single child contestant on the show.

In addition to the British format, one contestant in each episode of Skatoony North America was a guest contestant from a show from a Canadian animated series. Accordingly, a significant character from the series also appeared in the Skatoony opening sequence. Other children's series (including but not limited to shows on the Teletoon lineup) are often the subject of the questions asked on the shows. Guest contestants are taken from the following series:

Series	Seasons	Notes
Total Drama	1–3	Contestants for all three seasons are characters exclusively from Total Drama. During season 3, there was a mix of the characters from this show along with four characters from Jimmy Two-Shoes. Chris McLean appears in the opening sequence and also appeared as a contestant in the Season 3 episode "Pop Video", and Sierra appears in the Skatoony audience in each episode, even when there is no guest.
Jimmy Two-Shoes	3	Jimmy Two-Shoes airs on Teletoon in Canada and on Disney XD in the US. Heloise is seen online, and was a contestant in the Season 3 episode "Follow that Quizblock".

A similar situation occurs in Skatoony Arabia where guest contestants were taken from the animated series, Freej instead. With the exception of Skatoony North America (in Québec), all non-English language Skatoony releases uses animation footage from the original British version, which is why Tony Eagle Eyes is the hosts' boss instead of Charles La Puck.

== Guest contestant replacement ==
In Skatoony, the quizblock has six colored squares - green (top left), red (top middle), pink(top right), purple (bottom left), blue (bottom middle), and yellow (bottom right). The children get the green, pink and blue squares (they sometimes move to the purple, red and yellow squares if two child contestants remain in Round 3), and the cartoon contestants get the red, yellow and purple. The guest contestants take the place of a cartoon character in the UK version. In the episode 'Skeleton Crew in Da House' in North America, Scabz was originally a contestant but he left before the first round and was replaced by Harold.

=== Season 1 ===
Episode	Guest character	Color square they are in	UK cartoon character they replace
"Knights and Daze"	Owen	Red	Bradzilla
"Invasion"	Noah	Yellow	Eugene Keen
"I Stink, Therefore I Am"	Eva	Purple	Squeaky Sam
"Pirates"	Izzy	Purple	Wendell
"Skeleton Crew in Da House"	Harold	Red	Scabz
"Xcqankly"	Katie & Sadie	Purple	Easter Bunny
"To the Quiz Cave"	Gwen	Yellow	Hyacinth Bosh
"Quizoo"	Bridgette	Red	Doug
"Hoo Loves You, Baby!"	Courtney	Red	Kevin Quizzin
"Quiziatori Gladihost"	Leshawna	Yellow then Red	Rooks
"Superheroes"	Chef Hatchet	Red	Wasp Boy
"Dinosaur"	Ezekiel	Red	Professor Fuddlehudd
"Hooray for Bollywood"	Justin	Red	The I-Know-Bot

=== Season 2 ===
Episode	Guest character	Color square they are in	UK cartoon character they replace
"Body Swap"	Dakota	Yellow	Princess Nebula
"Sports Academy"	Lightning	Yellow	Nash Cash
"Trash Talk"	Izzy	Red	Royden
"Vikings"	Brick	Red	Stelly
"Stop the Pop"	Silent B	Purple	Freezee
"Inside La Puck"	Jo	Purple	Mac Mandrak
"I Spy, You Quiz"	Staci	Purple	Mary Lou
"Out to Sea"	Dawn	Red	Evie Mancheevy
"Freakshow"	Sam	Red	Matilda
"Destination: Moon"	Cameron	Yellow	Easter Bunny

Note: The episodes "Space: The Final Souffle", "Pre-School Problem" and "It Could Be You!" are all skipped because they have no guest.

=== Season 3 ===
Episode	Guest character	Color square they are in	UK cartoon character they replace
"Amusement Park"	Scott	Red	Hyacinth Bosh
"Follow that Quizblock"	Heloise	Purple	Frezzee
"Style Trial"	Anne Maria	Yellow	Mr. Yomp
"Pop Video"	Chris	Purple	Doug
"Quiz to the Future"	Jimmy Two-Shoes	Red	Kevin Quizzin
"Broke Charles"	Leshawna	Purple	Gore
"In Your Dreams"	Beezy	Purple	Fibbz
"Unusual Suspects"	Owen	Purple	Bradzilla
"Café Le Quiz"	Chef Hatchet	Purple	Lucrezia
"Host of Doom"	Lucius Heinous VII	Yellow	Sarge

=== Seasonal episodes ===
Episode	Guest character	Color square they are in	UK cartoon character they replace
"Stoopid Santa"	Zoey	Red	Hyacinth Bosh
"Halloween"	Mike	Purple	Dr. Jerkhill (and Mr. Hives)

== Factories in which eliminated contestants are ejected into ==
=== Season 1 ===
1) "Knights and Daze" - Sandpaper Factory

2) "Invasion" - Dentist's Convention

3) "I Stink, Therefore I Am" - Manure Factory

4) "Pirates" - Sewage Factory

5) "Skeleton Crew in Da House" - Porcupine Sanctuary

6) "Xcquankly" - Mousetrap Factory

7) "To the Quiz Cave" - Really Hard Mattress Company

8) "Quizoo" - Africa, Australia, and The North Pole

9) "Hoo Loves Ya, Baby!" - 80's Disco Nightclub

10) "Quiziatori Gladihost" - Secondhand Sock Depot

11) "Superheroes" - Broken Glass Factory

12) "Dinosaur" - Liver and Onion/Chopped Liver & Tripe Ice Cream Factory / Tar Pits

13) "Hooray for Bollywood" - Rat Perfume Factory

=== Season 2 ===
1) "Body Swap" - Concrete Pillow Factory

2) "Sports Academy" - Angry Pig World

3) "Space: The Final Souffle" - Planet Dung

4) "Pre-School Problem" - Used Nappy Dump / Dirty Diaper Factory (In US)

5) "Trash Talk" - Land o' Trash

6) "Vikings" - Toenail Warehouse

7) "Stop the Pop" - Faulty Bagpipe Superstore

8) "Inside Eagle Eyes/La Puck" - Miniature Village

9) "It Could Be You!" - Compost World

10) "I Spy, You Quiz" - Spikey Spike Factory / Spikey Spike Shipping

11) "Out to Sea" - Super Gassy Gut Beans Shipping

12) "Freakshow" - Fernando Fernando Fernando and Xcquankly's Freakshow Circus / Human-Animal Hybrid Genetics Lab

13) "Destination: Moon" - Galactic Garbage

=== Season 3 ===
1) "TJ/CJ's Birthday" - Sweaty Footballer's Pants Depot / Faulty Bagpipe Superstore (U.K. error)

2) "Amusement Park" - Rejected Hot Dog Meat Factory

3) "Follow that Quizblock" - Leftover School Dinners Dump

4) "Style Trial" - Pointy Pin Factory

5) "Pop Video" - Home for One Hit Wonders

6) "Quiz to the Future" - Broken Clock Factory / Tar Pits

7) "Broke Tony/Charles" - Worm World

8) "In Your Dreams" - Giant Frog Factory

9) "Unusual Suspects" - Gravy Recycling

10) "Café Le Quiz" - Hot Dog Factory

11) "Host of Doom" - Robo-World: Turning People Into Products for Over 20 Years

=== Seasonal episodes ===
1) "Halloween" - Rotten Pumpkin World

2) "Stoopid Santa" - Fake Holly Factory

== Format ==
The show's format is that three child contestants and three cartoon character contestants, making six contestants in all, compete in a quiz show lasting three rounds. At the end of each of the first two rounds, the two lowest scoring contestants are eliminated. The first round is always Bang On! or Bogus?, a rapid-fire true-or-false questioning round; with "Bang On!" meaning true, and "Bogus!" meaning false. The last two rounds vary between episodes. As contestants are eliminated, they are usually catapulted out of their seats as the hosts (and the remaining contestants) sing "You're Outta Here!". The losing contestants are catapulted into a factory containing something nasty, such as 'Compost World', 'Leftover School Dinners Dump', 'Used Nappy Dump (UK version) / Dirty Diaper Factory (North American version)' or 'Concrete Pillow Factory', and then they are (sometimes) not seen for the remainder of the episode. Vignettes featuring eliminated animated contestants (and on occasion, eliminated child contestants) interacting with Chudd or the Earl (and, on Skatoony North America, Charles La Puck, their boss ([Tony Eagle-Eyes in the UK])) also appear during the progression of the show; in Skatoony North America, this extends to the web extras available on the Skatoony website. The first round always ends with having one child contestant and a cartoon contestant being eliminated.

At the end of the third round, only 1 of the 2 remaining contestants gets eliminated through ejection, based on who has the lowest score at the end of the round. At the end of three rounds, the remaining contestant takes on the Skatoony Quiz Champ Challenge, where they must answer ten questions correctly in 90 seconds. After 45 seconds, the clock will temporarily stop, and Earl's Halfway Deal will be offered, trading in time for correct answers: in the UK version, deals offered were inconsistent in season 1. In seasons 2 and 3 of the UK version and all seasons of the North American version, the deals offered were as follows depending on the player's score:

- 3 points or less: 3 additional points in exchange for 25 seconds (20 seconds left)
- 4-5 points: 2 additional points in exchange for 20 seconds (25 seconds left)
- 6-7 points: 1 additional point in exchange for 10 seconds (35 seconds left)
- 8 points or more: No deal is offered

If the contestant finishes with time remaining and gets ten questions right, the contestant wins a prize, offered at the start of each episode. If a contestant finishes with the ten correct answers in under 45 seconds, they are further honoured with being called "#1 Skatoony Quiz Champ Champion". This only happened once in the show's history in the North American version of "Quizoo."

Note that the games used in each round and the contestants' interactions are based on the number of child contestants remaining, and that the game always ensures that a child contestant will always be the last remaining contestant. Sometimes, for the third round, it can be either one child vs. one toon, or two children vs. each other. In addition, it is typical for the second-round challenge to be rigged against an animated contestant, leading to their elimination as well.

In Skatoony North America, the prize for winning the Skatoony Quiz Champ Challenge in the first season was an iPod Touch; later seasons have refused to disclose the grand prize. Other merchandise from Teletoon shows are also awarded to the contestants for their participation.

In the British version, the prizes were:

- Season 1: A Sony PSP (on two episodes it was a video iPod). In one episode it was turned into a frog.
- Season 2: A Wii console
- Season 3: An iPod Touch (on two episodes it was a Nintendo DS console). In one episode it was a chocolate scale model of Tony Eagle Eyes/Charles La Puck.

According to certain articles, the prize for the Hindi version was a Sony PlayStation 3 console.

In the Arabic version, the prize was a trophy.

In the one currently available episode of the German version (Season 1, Episode 4: Pirates!), the prize was a Nintendo DS and the Ben 10: Alien Force video game.

== Rounds ==
Beyond Bang On! or Bogus? (used in the first round) and the Skatoony Quiz Champ Challenge (when one contestant remains), the following challenges have been used:

=== Round 1 challenges ===
- Bang On! or Bogus? (All Seasons [UK, India, UAE, Germany and NA]) - Chudd will say a lot of silly things, some of it is true, but some of it is false. When the contestants think it is true, they say "Bang On!" And when the contestants think it is false, they say "Bogus".

=== Round 2 challenges ===
- Draw What You Hear, and Shout Out When You Know What You've Drawn! (All Seasons [UK and NA]) - Chudd will use words to describe what it is to be drawn, and contestants must infer what is being drawn from Chudd's instructions. Chudd will continue with the description until one contestant answers correctly.
- Wear in the World? (Season 1 [UK and NA]) - Each contestant is given three hats, representing three countries. All of Chudd's questions this round have answers corresponding to one of these three countries, and contestants must wear the correct hat in order to be awarded points. Giving the correct answer verbally while wearing the wrong hat (or not wearing the hat at all) does not award points.
- Same Sound Name Round (Season 1 [UK and NA]) - Each contestant is given three placards, each depicting a picture corresponding to a particular word, with all three words rhyming with each other. Chudd's questions in this round will have an answer that will either match or have the same pronunciation as one of these three placards. Contestants are only awarded points for presenting the correct placard: giving the correct answer verbally while presenting the wrong placard does not award points.
- Alphabet Soup (Season 2 [UK and NA]) - Each contestant is given four letters embedded in a liquid. Chudd's questions will have answers that begin with or have the same pronunciation as one of the letters of the alphabet. Contestants are only awarded points for presenting the correct letter of the alphabet; giving the correct answer verbally whilst holding the wrong letter does not award points. It was only played once in the Season 2 episode "Body Swap".
- Throw If You Know (Seasons 2 and 3 [UK and NA]) - Each Contestant wears a big round hat with three balls, each with a different type, Chudd's questions will be about them. If they get it right, they have to throw the correct ball to Chudd. In the Season 3 episode "Amusement Park", the balls were replaced with moons, stars, and planets.
- Blindfold Buffet (Season 2 [UK and NA]) - In front of the contestants are five different foods or animals, which are answers to the questions that are answered. They have to pick up a handful of the right answer, then buzz in. However, all the contestants are blindfolded, so that they cannot see the object in front of them. Contestants are only awarded points for presenting the correct item; giving the correct answer verbally whilst holding the wrong item does not award points. This round is never played in the Skatoony studio, and it was played in the Season 2 episodes, "Space: The Final Souffle" and "Out to Sea".
- Cheery Tunes (Season 2 [UK and NA]) - The contestants have to guess the tune of a nursery rhyme Earl plays. It was only played in the Season 2 episode "Pre-School Problem"'.
- Goldie Pops' Deeply Dipping Game (Season 2 [UK and NA]) - Goldie Pops' personal game, which was only played in the Season 2 episode "Stop The Pop" to replace "Draw What You Hear, and Shout Out When You Know What You've Drawn!". Similar to Same Sound Name Round, except the three rhyming answers are in tanks of sludge, and the contestants must pick the answers up with their teeth, similar to apple bobbing. It was called 'Goldie Pops' Same Sound Name Round' in the NA version.
- Colour Me Quizzy (Seasons 2 and 3 [UK and NA]) - The contestants have three boxes of paint in front of them. They have to dip their face in the correct color, then hit their buzzer. Contestants are only awarded points for the correct color that is on their face; giving the correct answer verbally whilst the wrong color paint is on their face does not award points. The child contestants (and cartoon contestants) wear goggles to protect their eyes. In the Season 3 episode "Cafe Le Quiz", they substituted the paint for mustard (yellow), barbecue sauce (brown), and mushy peas (green).
- Quick Pic Picking! (Season 2 [UK and NA]) - There is a roulette of animal pictures, and contestants have to guess the animal Chudd is describing. The players must buzz in when the roulette shows the right picture. Giving the correct answer verbally while stopping at the wrong picture does not award points. Chudd will continue his description until someone answers correctly. Players cannot buzz in more than once for the same question. It was only played once in the Season 2 episode "I Spy, You Quiz".
- Animal Swap-a-Butt (Seasons 2 [UK] and 3 [UK and NA]) - Fernando Fernando Fernando has a group of animal hybrids. The contestants must guess the two correct animals, to earn a point. It was played in the episodes "Freakshow" and "In Your Dreams".
- Talkin' Backwords! (Season 3 [UK and NA]) - Chudd goes around the quizblock and asks each of the contestants a question in turn; but they have to give their answer back to front. Seen and played in the Season 3 episodes "CJ's Birthday" and "Follow that Quizblock".
- Colourful Language (Season 3 [UK and NA]) - Each contestant has four boxes in front of them, each with a different colour. Chudd's questions will be about the colours written on the box. They have to give the colour written on the box, not the one coloured. It was only played once in the Season 3 episode "Pop Video".
- Blinking Brain Box (Season 3 [UK and NA]) - For this game, Chudd wears a helmet that shows his thoughts, but they are jumbled. The contestants must figure out what he is thinking of, they can earn up to five points, depending how fast they can figure out what Chudd is thinking and it made the easiest way to eliminate both toon contestants in each episode. This game was played in the Season 3 episodes "Quiz to the Future" and "Host of Doom".

=== Round 3 challenges ===
- Hoo Flung Dung! (All Seasons [UK and NA]) - In this round, Hoo, the "artistic gorilla", will throw his "paint" (though claimed to be dung by the round's title, on other occasions it is implied to be ordinary mud) onto a canvas. The "paint" will form into a particular shape, which the contestants must identify. A particular feature of this challenge is the fact that some of the "paint" is splattered on the contestants. In the UK version, the question would sometimes end when the painting was finished, while in the NA version, it would always last until a player guessed correctly.
- Fast Food (Seasons 1 and 2 [UK and NA])- The contestants compete head to head in a speed quizzing challenge. Each contestant will have as much time as it takes for the other to consume a specified quantity of food. In the episode "Space: The Final Souffle", each player had a backup timer which would be used if their opponent didn't finish the food fast enough.
- DangerBox (Season 1 [UK and NA]) - Presented in front of each contestant are three boxes, each of which contains a particular type of food, be it something nice or nasty. Contestants must open a box and eat its contents before giving the answer to each question Chudd asks. Contestants may not pick a box more than once. Refusing to eat what's in a box will deny the contestant both the question and the points with it.
- Egg Noggin! (All Seasons [UK and NA]) - Presented in front of each contestant is a row of eggs, some of which are raw and some of which are hard-boiled. The two contestants must listen to the general knowledge questions, and then buzz in when they know the answer. Contestants are awarded one point for each correct answer. Regardless of whether the contestant answers correctly or not, contestants must then select an egg and break it against their forehead. A bonus point is awarded if the egg chosen is hard-boiled, but if it is raw, the egg yolk will splatter all over their face. Enough eggs are provided so that neither contestant runs out of eggs.
- The DangerGrid of Doom (Seasons 2 and 3 [UK and NA]) - The DangerGrid of Doom is a huge robot with a panel of twelve numbers, each containing a nasty surprise such as drenching the contestant in various gunge or a deduction of points. Contestants answering correctly may choose one panel from the grid as a nasty surprise to unleash on their opponent. Conversely, contestants answering incorrectly are subject to a nasty surprise chosen by their opponent from the grid. In the Season 3 episode "Host of Doom", the Dangergrid of Doom was the new host/main antagonist of the episode, but his round was never played.
- Viking Flung Dung! (Season 2 [UK and NA]) - Same rules as Hoo Flung Dung, but only played in the Season 2 episode "Vikings".
- Stinky Drinky (Seasons 2 and 3 [UK and NA]) - Contestants have to answer general knowledge questions. If the contestant gets it right, their opponent has to drink one of the nasty drinks lined up in front of them. But if they get the question wrong, they have to drink one. If anyone refuses to drink, either they lose a point or their opponent gets a bonus point, though this never happened in any episode. Just like Blindfold Buffet, this round is never played in the studio; it was played various locations, including in a spooky cave, inside their boss' stomach, and out in the desert in the middle of nowhere.
- Mince Pie Roulette (Seasons 2 [UK] and 3 [UK and NA]) - Contestants have to answer general knowledge questions. If they get it right, their opponent has to eat one of the pies lined up in front of them, except the filling is something horrid. If the player gets the question wrong, they have to eat a pie. If they refuse to eat a pie, they lose a point. In the NA, this game is called "Mystery Pie Roulette".

=== Final Round challenges ===
- Skatoony Quiz Champ Challenge (all Seasons [UK and NA]) - At the end of three rounds, the remaining contestant takes on the Skatoony Quiz Champ Challenge, where they must answer ten questions correctly in 90 seconds.
- Earl's Halfway Deal (all Seasons [UK and NA]) - Halfway through the round, the Earl will offer the contestant a deal. He will give the player extra points, however he will also take away some time. The player has a choice of whether to accept the deal or to reject it. The only time Earl doesn't offer a deal is either when a contestant has 8 points or more or if a contestant scores 10 points in under 45 seconds.
- Time to Play for a Prize! (Season 2 [UK and NA]) - The Tooskany version of the Skatoony Quiz Champ Challenge, seen in the Season 2 episode "Trash Talk".
- La-Re's Magical Middle Moment (Season 2 [UK and NA]) - The Tooskany version of Earl's Halfway Deal, seen in the Season 2 episode "Trash Talk".

== Child contestant elimination chart ==
=== Season 1 ===
Episode	Kid Elimination 1st Round in NA	Kid Elimination 2nd Round/3rd Round in NA	Kid Elimination 1st Round in UK	Kid Elimination 2nd Round/3rd Round in UK
"Knights and Daze"	Jasmine	Adea (2)	Makozie	Joella (2)
"Invasion"	Gennesys	Emily (3)	India	Hannah (3)
"I Stink, Therefore I Am"	Connor	Megan (2)	Matthew	Cherife (2)
"Pirates"	Margot	Victor (2)	Ben	Leroy (2)
"Skeleton Crew in Da House"	Rachel	Saer (2)	Cain	Bashir (2)
"Xcqankly"	Beatrice	Julian (3)	Kayisha	Gervaise (3)
"To the Quiz Cave"	Peter	Jordan (2)	Naroona	Isabelle (2)
"Quizoo"	Marc	Kristen (3)	Sam	Joe (3)
"Hoo Loves Ya, Baby!"	Arija	Patricia (3)	Lashay	Daniel (3)
"Quiziatori Gladihost"	Melissa	Stephanie (3)	Hani	Ollie (3)
"Superheroes"	Natasha	Brett (3)	Lara	Jess (3)
"Dinosaur"	Cassidy	David (3)	Georgina	Libby (3)
"Hooray for Bollywood"	Andrea	Amina (2)	Jessica	Aiden (2)

=== Season 2 ===
Episode	Kid Elimination 1st Round in NA	Kid Elimination 2nd Round/3rd Round in NA	Kid Elimination 1st Round in UK	Kid Elimination 2nd Round/3rd Round in UK
"Body Swap"	Karl	Lucas (2)	Lexie	Sam (2)
"Sports Academy"	Bradley	Connor (2)	Chaz	Mike (2)
"Space: The Final Souffle"	Sean	Cole (3)	Will	Carlo (3)
"Pre-School Problem"	Talia	Mercedes (2)	Jingle	Dom (2)
"Trash Talk"	Taelor	Nicole (3)	Ry	Day Day (3)
"Vikings"	Jessica	Mara (3)	Beth	Shaz (3)
"Stop the Pop"	Alyssa	Christina (2)	Martha	Saz (2)
"Inside La Puck"	Shannon	Tiana (3)	Jake	Wilf (3)
"It Could Be You!"	Claire	Javan (3)	Annie	Dwayne (3)
"I Spy, You Quiz"	Ronny	Shania (3)	Cookie	Payno (3)
"Out to Sea"	Samantha	Mark (3)	Jessie	Abi (3)
"Freakshow"	Andrea	Dylan (2)	Maire	Becky (2)
"Destination: Moon"	Skye	Madeline (3)	Becky	Chloe (3)

=== Season 3 ===
Episode	Kid Elimination 1st Round in NA	Kid Elimination 2nd Round/3rd Round in NA	Kid Elimination 1st Round in UK	Kid Elimination 2nd Round/3rd Round in UK
"Halloween"	Seairra	Rebecca (3)	Jim-Jams	Sheenie (3)
"Stoopid Santa"	Isaac	Kathryn (2)	Lulu	Henri (2)
"CJ's Birthday"	Shayla	Cameron (2)	Jermaine	Ale (2)
"Amusement Park"	Sephra	Aidan (3)	Fab	Wills (3)
"Follow that Quizblock"	Jessica	Rocky (2)	Scott	Ciaran (2)
"Style Trial"	Kayla	Makai (3)	Chantelle	Bluesette (3)
"Pop Video"	Ingrid	Nathan (3)	Hannah	Kaysha (3)
"Quiz to the Future"	Emily	Hilli (3)	Joel	Leah (3)
"Broke Charles"	Kasandra	Nicholas (2)	Matty	Luca (2)
"In Your Dreams"	Cole	Stephanie (2)	Cathy	Nathan (2)
"Unusual Suspects"	Sarah	Jordan (2)	Cherelle	Will (2)
"Café Le Quiz"	Simone	Trevor (3)	Enzo	Aaron (3)
"Host of Doom"	Nicole	Kristen (3)	Katie	Sadaf (3)

== Cartoon contestant elimination chart ==
=== Season 1 ===
Episode	Toon Elimination 1st Round [NA]	color square he/she was in [NA]	Toon Elimination 2nd/3rd Round [NA]	color square he/she was in [NA]	Toon Elimination 1st Round [UK]	color square he/she was in [UK]	Toon Elimination 2nd/3rd Round [UK]	color square he/she was in [UK]
"Knights and Daze"	Sir Rudolph	Yellow	Owen (2) Nebby (3)	Red (Owen) Purple (Nebby)	Sir Rudolph	Yellow	Bradzilla (2) Nebby (3)	Red (Bradzilla) Purple (Nebby)
"Invasion"	Freezee	Purple	Zeppo (2) Noah (2)	Red (Zeppo) Yellow (Noah)	Freezee	Purple	Zeppo (2) Eugene Keen (2)	Red (Zeppo) Yellow (Eugene Keen)
"I Stink, Therefore I Am"	Poshbotts	Yellow	Eva (2) Bigfoot (3)	Purple (Eva) Red-Purple (Bigfoot)	Poshbotts	Yellow	Squeaky Sam (2) Bigfoot (3)	Purple (Squeaky Sam) Red-Purple (Bigfoot)
"Pirates"	Jonah	Yellow	Dabs Looman (2) Izzy (3)	Red (Dabs Looman) Purple (Izzy)	Jonah	Yellow	Dabs Looman (2) Wendell (3)	Red (Dabs Looman) Purple-Red (Wendell)
"Skeleton Crew in Da House"	Fibbs (was supposed to be T-Bone)	Purple-Yellow	Harold (2, was supposed to be T-Bone) T-Bone (3)	Red (Harold) Yellow-Purple-Red (T-Bone)	Fibbs (was supposed to be T-Bone)	Purple-Yellow	Scabz (2, was supposed to be T-Bone) T-Bone (3)	Red (Scabz) Yellow-Purple-Red (T-Bone)
"Xcqankly"	Katie & Sadie	Purple	Xcqankly (2) Santa Claus (2)	Red (Xcqankly) Yellow (Santa Claus)	Easter Bunny	Purple	Xcqankly (2) Santa Claus (2)	Red (Xcqankly) Yellow (Santa Claus)
"To the Quiz Cave"	Hunty Morrison (was supposed to be CJ)	Purple	Gwen (2) CJ (3)	Yellow (Gwen) Red (CJ)	Hunty Morrison (was supposed to be TJ)	Purple	Hyacinth Bosh (2) TJ (3)	Yellow (Hyacinth Bosh) Red (TJ)
"Quizoo"	Rory/Violet	Yellow/Purple	Dale (2) Bridgette (2)	Purple (Dale) Red (Bridgette)	Rory/Violet	Yellow/Purple	Dale (2) Doug (2)	Purple (Dale) Red (Doug)
"Hoo Loves Ya, Baby!"	Monty	Purple	Courtney (2) Roland Landlubber (2)	Red (Courtney) Yellow (Roland Landlubber)	Monty	Purple	Kevin Quizzin (2) Roland Landlubber (2)	Red (Kevin Quizzin) Yellow (Roland Landlubber)
"Quiziatori Gladihost"	Hedley Diddleydee	Red	Gore (2) Leshawna (2)	Purple (Gore) Yellow-Red (Leshawna)	Hedley Diddleydee	Red	Gore (2) Rooks (2)	Purple (Gore) Yellow-Red (Rooks)
"Superheroes"	Captain Quills	Yellow	Guts Glory (2) Chef Hatchet (2)	Purple (Guts Glory) Red (Chef Hatchet)	Captain Quills	Yellow	Guts Glory (2) Wasp Boy (2)	Purple (Guts Glory) Red (Wasp Boy)
"Dinosaur"	Des Doodle	Purple	Jerrett the Parrot (ejected early due to devolving into a dinosaur) Ezekiel (2)	Yellow (Jerrett the Parrot) Red (Ezekiel)	Des Doodle	Purple	Jerrett the Parrot (ejected early due to devolving into a dinosaur) Professor Fuddlehudd (2)	Yellow (Jerrett the Parrot) Red (Professor Fuddlehudd)
"Hooray for Bollywood"	Ranjit	Purple	Justin (2) Attila (3)	Red (Justin) Yellow-Purple (Attila)	Ranjit	Purple	The I-Know Bot (2) Attila (3)	Red (The I-Know Bot) Yellow-Purple (Attila)

=== Season 2 ===
Episode	Toon Elimination 1st Round [NA]	color square he/she was in [NA]	Toon Elimination 2nd/3rd Round [NA]	color square he/she was in [NA]	Toon Elimination 1st Round [UK]	color square he/she was in [UK]	Toon Elimination 2nd/3rd Round [UK]	color square he/she was in [UK]
"Body Swap"	Dakota in Fernando Fernando Fernando's body	Purple	Roland Landlubber in Dakota's body (2) Taylor in Roland Landlubber's body (3)	Yellow (Dakota) Red (Roland Landlubber)	Nebby in Fernando Fernando Fernando's body	Purple	Roland Landlubber in Nebby's body (2) John in Roland Landlubber's body (3)	Yellow (Nebby) Red (Roland Landlubber)
"Sports Academy"	Lightning	Yellow	Ricky (2) Rex (3)	Purple (Ricky) Red (Rex)	Nash Cash	Yellow	Ricky (2) Rex (3)	Purple (Ricky) Red (Rex)
"Space: The Final Souffle"	Chef	Red	Geoff (2) Matilda (2)	Purple (Geoff) Yellow (Matilda)	Chef	Red	Geoff (2) Matilda (2)	Purple (Geoff) Yellow (Matilda)
"Pre-School Problem"	Two	Purple	Oop-de-Doop (2) Super Smile Gang (3)	Red (Oop-de-Doop) Yellow-Red (Super Smile Gang)	Two	Purple	Oop-de-Doop (2) Super Smile Gang (3)	Red (Oop-de-Doop) Yellow-Red (Super Smile Gang)
"Trash Talk"	Zammo	Purple	Izzy (2) Lid-Face (2)	Red (Izzy) Yellow (Lid-Face)	Zammo	Purple	Royden (2) Lid-Face (2)	Red (Royden) Yellow (Lid-Face)
"Vikings"	Sarge	Yellow	Skad (2) Brick (2)	Purple (Skad) Red (Brick)	Sarge	Yellow	Skad (2) Stelly (2)	Purple (Skad) Red (Stelly)
"Stop the Pop"	Silent B	Purple	T-Bone (2) Skidz (3)	Yellow (T-Bone) Red (Skidz)	Freezee	Purple	T-Bone (2) Skidz (3)	Yellow (T-Bone) Red (Skidz)
"Inside La Puck/Eagle Eyes"	Jo	Purple	Gene Genie (2) Suzie Space (2)	Yellow (Gene Genie) Red (Suzie Space)	Mac Mandrak	Purple	Gene Genie (2) Suzie Space (2)	Yellow (Gene Genie) Red (Suzie Space)
"It Could Be You"	Mom	Purple	Bonnie (2) Burp (2)	Yellow (Bonnie) Red (Burp)	Mum	Purple	Bonnie (2) Burp (2)	Yellow (Bonnie) Red (Burp)
"I Spy, You Quiz"	Agent Carruthers	Yellow	Staci (2) Mr. Yomp (2)	Purple (Staci) Red (Mr. Yomp)	Agent Carruthers	Yellow	Mary Lou (2) Mr. Yomp (2)	Purple (Mary Lou) Red (Mr. Yomp)
"Out to Sea"	Sham Sham	Yellow	Dawn (2) Sven Strudel (2)	Red (Dawn) Purple (Sven Strudel)	Sham Sham	Yellow	Evie Mancheevy (2) Sven Strudel (2)	Red (Evie Mancheevy) Purple (Sven Strudel)
"Freakshow"	Fernando Fernando Fernando	Purple	Xcqankly (2) Sam (3)	Yellow (Xcqankly) Red (Sam)	Fernando Fernando Fernando	Purple	Xcqankly (2) Matilda (3)	Yellow (Xcqankly) Red (Matilda)
"Destination: Moon	Tank	Purple	Cameron (2) Professor Fuddlehudd (2)	Yellow (Cameron) Red (Professor Fuddlehudd)	Tank	Purple	Easter Bunny (2) Professor Fuddlehudd (2)	Yellow (Easter Bunny) Red (Professor Fuddlehudd)

=== Season 3 ===
Episode	Toon Elimination 1st Round [NA]	color square he/she was in [NA]	Toon Elimination 2nd/3rd Round [NA]	color square he/she was in [NA]	Toon Elimination 1st Round [UK]	color square he/she was in [UK]	Toon Elimination 2nd/3rd Round [UK]	color square he/she was in [UK]
"Haloween"	Frankie	Red	Mike (2) Lucrezia (2)	Purple (Mike) Yellow (Lucrezia)	Frankie	Red	Dr. Jerkhill (and Mr. Hives) (2) Lucrezia (2)	Purple (Dr. Jerkhill (and Mr. Hives)) Yellow (Lucrezia)
"Stoopid Santa"	Ernie Einstein	Yellow	Zoey (2) Santa Claus (3)	Red (Zoey) Purple-Red (Santa)	Ernie Einstein	Yellow	Hyacinth Bosh (2) Santa Claus (3)	Red (Hyacinth Bosh) Purple (Santa)
"CJ/TJ's Birthday"	Dabs Looman	Purple	Katie & Sadie (2) CJ (3)	Yellow (Katie & Sadie) Red (CJ)	Dabs Looman	Purple	Super Smile Gang (2) TJ (3)	Yellow (Super Smile Gang) Red (TJ)
"Amusement Park"	Tafgar	Purple	Wasp Boy (2) Scott (2)	Red (Wasp Boy) Yellow (Scott)	Tafgar	Purple	Wasp Boy (2) Hyacinth Bosh (2)	Red (Wasp Boy) Yellow (Hyacinth Bosh)
"Follow that Quizblock"	Heloise	Purple	Metazor (2) Nebby (3)	Yellow (Metazor) Red (Nebby)	Freezee	Purple	Metazor (2) Nebby (3)	Yellow (Metazor) Red (Nebby)
"Style Trial"	Flit	Purple	Anne Maria (2) Coo Coo Cachew (2)	Yellow (Anne Maria) Red (Coo Coo Cachew)	Flit	Purple	Mr. Yomp (2) Coo Coo Cachew (2)	Yellow (Mr. Yomp) Red (Coo Coo Cachew)
"Pop Video"	Chris McLean	Purple	Dabs Looman (2) Scabz (2)	Yellow (Dabs Looman) Red (Scabz)	Doug	Purple	Dabs Looman (2) Scabz (2)	Yellow (Dabs Looman) Red (Scabz)
"Quiz to the Future"	Jimmy Two Shoes	Red	Dan Blam (2) Gummo (2)	Yellow (Dan Blam) Purple (Gummo)	Kevin Quizzin	Red	Dan Blam (2) Gummo (2)	Yellow (Dan Blam) Purple (Gummo)
"Broke Charles/Tony"	Leshawna	Purple	Jesse Vesperse (2) Attila (3)	Yellow (Jesse Vesperse) Red (Attila)	Gore	Purple	Jesse Vesperse (2) Attila (3)	Yellow (Jesse Vesperse) Red (Attila)
"In Your Dreams"	Roland Landlubber	Yellow	Sven Strudel (2) Beezy (3)	Red (Sven Strudel) Purple (Beezy)	Roland Landlubber	Yellow	Sven Strudel (2) Fibbs (3)	Red (Sven Strudel) Purple (Fibbs)
"Unusual Suspects"	Shirley Curls	Yellow	Owen (2) Hedley/Nedley (3)	Purple (Owen) Red-Purple (Hedley/Nedley)	Shirley Curls	Yellow	Bradzilla (2) Hedley/Nedley (3)	Purple (Bradzilla) Red (Hedley/Nedley)
"Cafe Le Quiz"	Zammo	Yellow	Chef Hatchet (2) Zeppo (2)	Purple (Chef Hatchet) Red (Zeppo)	Zammo	Yellow	Lucrezia (2) Zeppo (2)	Purple (Lucrezia) Red (Zeppo)
"Host of Doom"	Lucius Heinous VII	Yellow	Mash (2) Planet Moop (2)	Red-Yellow (Mash) Purple (Planet Moop)	Sarge	Red	Mash (2) Planet Moop (2)	Yellow (Mash) Purple (Planet Moop)

== Development ==
Production started on 30 March 2006, when Cartoon Network UK had announced a full television series combining live-action & animated entitled Skatoony, following the success of earlier online games, interactive phone-ins, and segments like Skatoony Truckatoony, the live-action/animated hybrid TV series would feature real-life contestants against cartoon contestants against three rapidfire rounds with Cartoon Network UK's would handle animation production for the live-action/animated TV series at its in-house London headquarters while independent producer Talent Television would handle & shoot all live-action elements, Finn Arnesen, head of original animation and original development at Cartoon Network UK's parent Turner Broadcasting, would serve as executive producer.

One year later in April 2007, Cartoon Network UK signed an international distribution pact with British independent television production distribution studio Target Entertainment, to handle international distribution & sales rights to Cartoon Network UK's live-action/animated hybrid game show series Skatoony, with Target Entertainment brought global distribution & formats to Skatoony at MIPTV, and would produce localized adaptations and versions of the show internationally.

In February 2009 when Skatoony's third season continued airing on Cartoon Network UK, Toronto-based Canadian independent global entertainment company and television production house MarbleMedia had brought North American formats to the British live-action/animated hybrid game show series Skatoony from distribution rights holder Target Entertainment & Cartoon Network UK, the owner of the British series Skatoony, and would produce a Canadian version of the series while Canadian TV channel Teletoon had commissioned a Canadian adaptation of the British live-action/animated hybrid game show series entitled Skatoony North America, with MarbleMedia would shoot real-life contestants for the English & Canadian French adaptations of the format, while MarbleMedia announcing the launch of an interactive site for the Canadian adaptation of Skatoony. One month later in March, MarbleMedia started production for its own Canadian adaptation of the British live-action/animated hybrid game show Skatoony, with them revealing a new character for the Canadian adaptation named Charles La Puck, replacing the original UK boss of Skatoony, Tony Eagle-Eyes, and MarbleMedia revealed that they brought in characters from Teletoon's series Total Drama Island as constestants exclusively for the Canadian version, replacing some of the original British cartoon contestants & Smiley Guy Studios would handle animation production services for the Canadian version of Skatoony.

Target Entertainment originally handled international distribution rights to the original British version and MarbleMedia originally handled distribution to the Canadian adaptation of the British live-action/animated game show Skatoony until February 2011, when MarbleMedia's joint-venture &, later fully-owned distribution subsidiary Distribution360 had brought worldwide distribution to the original British live-action/animated game show Skatoony and its MarbleMedia-produced Canadian adaptation and would bring it to the French & German speaking territories alongside Spain. and currently since 2023, Blue Ant Media's distribution arm Blue Ant Rights currently handle distribution to the series since their acquisition of MarbleMedia.
