= List of Skatoony episodes =

This is a list of Skatoony episodes.

== List of episodes ==
=== Season 1 ===
No. in overall	Title	Airdate (NA only)	Guest Contestant (NA and JP only)	Guest Result (NA and JP only)	Plot Arc	Round 2 Challenge	Round 3 Challenge	Quiz Champ Challenge Result	UK Quiz Champ Challenge Result	Winner in NA	Winner in UK
1	"Knights and Daze"	October 28, 2010	Owen (Scott McCord)	Eliminated 2nd Round	Sir Rudolph, a knight contestant, tries to defend the honour of his fair maiden Princess Nebula, who is also a contestant. But after he is eliminated in the first round, he accuses Chudd of stealing the symbol of their love which is really Nebula's used hanky for his used hanky collection, and challenges Chudd to a joust after the second round, which Chudd wins easily. Note 1: This is the first episode to have an opposite result of the UK version. Note 2: The NA version is the first episode to feature 3 female kids. Note 3: This marks the first time an eliminated contestant returns after being ejected in the episode. In this case, it's Sir Rudolph. Extra: Behind the Scenes - A look at the child contestants arriving for their game.	Draw What You Hear, and Shout Out When You Know What You've Drawn!	Hoo Flung Dung!	10/10 (5/10 at half, accepted deal)	7/10 (4/10 at half, accepted deal)	Erin-Dina	Chanelle
2	"Invasion"	November 4, 2010	Noah (Carter Hayden)	Eliminated 2nd Round	Colonel Zeppo, an alien contestant, demands his revenge after he gets eliminated in the second round. Note 1: The UK version is the first episode to feature 3 female kids. Note 2: The kid eliminated in round 1 was the only contestant to be seen ejected this episode, and was coincidentally in the pink square. Note 3: Gennesys is the only kid contestant in the NA version of season 1 to not score a point during a round. Note 4: This marks the second time an eliminated contestant returns after being ejected in the episode. In this case, it is Colonel Zeppo. Note 5: Chudd has lied, a watermelon is a fruit. Extra: During the Commercial Break - Zeppo attempts to cheat by abducting Chudd and Earl and replacing them with alien duplicates, but the clones get caught by Charles and shattered to pieces, forcing Zeppo to return Chudd and Earl.	Wear in the World?	Fast Food	10/10 (6/10 at half, accepted deal)	10/10 (6/10 at half, refused deal)	Callum	Lori
3	"I Stink, Therefore I Am"	November 11, 2010 (French Teletoon); November 18, 2010 (English Teletoon)	Eva (Julia Chantrey)	Eliminated 2nd Round	Charles/Tony demands the game to be rigged to eliminate a stinky Bigfoot in favour of Posh Botts, a fancy lady who was eliminated in the first round, but Chudd and Earl refuse. Earl gives Bigfoot a makeover. In the end, after Bigfoot loses the third round whilst sacrificing his smart makeover to save contestant Sanja (Fara in UK) that moves on to the final round from being splattered by poo, the two affected contestants become a couple. Note 1: The short is not on Télétoon in French. Note 2: This is the first episode of Skatoony where the "You're Outta Here" song isn't played entirely. This will happen again in the Season 3 episode "Host of Doom". Extra: After the Show - Earl's new makeover business turns the pirate crew (from the following episode) into a boy band.	Wear in the World?	Hoo Flung Dung!	7/10 (2/10 at half, accepted deal)	7/10 (2/10 at half, rejected deal)	Sanja	Fara
4	"Pirates"	November 18, 2010 (French Teletoon); November 25, 2010 (English Teletoon)	Izzy (Katie Crown)	Eliminated 3rd Round	Pirates, assisted by guest star Izzy (Wendall in UK), hijack the set and kidnap the contestants, and will Chudd and Earl stop them? Note: The UK version is the first episode not to include at least 1 female player. Note 3: This is the only appearance of Silly Millie. Note 2: Izzy is the first Total Drama contestant to be eliminated in the third round. Note 4: Chudd says, "At the end of round 2," instead of round 1. Extra: After the Show - Dabs, the balloon contestant, has his body replaced after being inadvertently popped.	Same Sound Name Round	DangerBox	10/10 (8/10 at half, no deal)	10/10 (4/10 at half, accepted deal)	Jacob	Corin
5	"Skeleton Crew in Da House"	November 25, 2010 (French Teletoon); December 2, 2010 (English Teletoon)	Harold (Brian Froud)	Quit 2nd Round (supposed to be eliminated in the 3rd Round)	T-Bone, the lead singer of a band called the Skeleton Crew, refuses to admit defeat when he loses the first round and demands to take over another band member's spot when he is eliminated after each round, but when he loses the last round, he retaliates by throwing eggs at contestant Matthew (Amir in UK), but Chudd and Earl smash him up with a mongo-sized egg. Also, Charles's granny is also there, and Chudd and Earl have to stop her seeing the Skeleton Crew and guest star Harold (NA only). Note 1: Harold is the second contestant in this episode to quit Skatoony, with former contestant Scabz being the first. Note 2: Harold is also the first and only guest contestant to quit Skatoony. Extra: After the Show - The Skeleton Crew raps a promo for Skatoony.	Draw What You Hear, and Shout Out When You Know What You've Drawn!	Egg Noggin!	7/10 (6/10 at half, accepted deal)	10/10 (7/10 at half, accepted deal)	Matthew	Amir
6	"Xcqankly"	December 2, 2010 (French Teletoon); December 9, 2010 (English Teletoon)	Katie (Stephanie Anne Mills) and Sadie (Lauren Lipson)	Eliminated 1st Round	Xcqankly, a mythical beast contestant, raises the suspicion of Chudd and Earl, and he exacts his revenge following his elimination from the second round, but is stopped by Hoo and his dung, and mailed to the North Pole. Note 1: Katie and Sadie are the only Total Drama contestants to be a pair, and also the first and only guest contestants to be eliminated in the 1st round in season 1. Note 2: This marks the third time an eliminated contestant returns after being ejected in the episode. In this case, it's Xcqankly. Note 3: This is the only episode where in the UK and NA, the contestant playing the Quiz Champ Challenge doesn't need a halfway deal. Note 4: Xcqankly is the first toon contestant to be seen flying away from the landing area. Flit from Style Trial would be followed after. Extra: During the Commercial Break - Santa's elves trash the Skatoony set as Hoo and Charles join in.	Draw What You Hear, and Shout Out When You Know What You've Drawn!	Hoo Flung Dung!	10/10 (8/10 at half, no deal)	10/10 (9/10 at half, no deal)	Kristen	Eben
7	"To the Quiz Cave"	December 16, 2010 (French Teletoon); January 6, 2011 (English Teletoon)	Gwen (Megan Fahlenbock)	Eliminated 2nd Round	The quiz is having a school theme today, but Charles'/Tony's nephew CJ/TJ is a contestant, and he takes advantage of the nepotistic treatment. But after he gets eliminated in the first round, he throws a tantrum and, accidentally sends the whole quizblock down into a big cave, which is home to a giant bat! It's up to Chudd and Earl to save the contestants. Note: CJ/ TJ took the place of Hunty, a contestant with a Brussels sprout head in Round 2 and had assisted help from his uncle to make it to Round 3, until his final elimination. Extra: After the Show - Chudd discloses Earl's 'practice' of not keeping his promises, but gets busted when Earl makes him fight a scorpion in a glass dome.	Wear in the World?	DangerBox	10/10 (8/10 at half, no deal)	10/10 (7/10 at half, accepted deal)	Samantha	Sam
8	"Quizoo"	December 31, 2010 (French Teletoon); January 20, 2011 (English Teletoon)	Bridgette (Kristin Fairlie)	Eliminated 2nd Round	The show is on location at Charles'/Tony's animal zoo, where guest star Bridgette (NA only) is protesting Charles' nasty animal treatment, whilst disguised as a bear. Chudd and Earl decide to help Bridgette's (NA only) endeavour by "eliminating" the animal contestants, including Bridgette (NA only) and ejecting them to freedom after each round. And after the last round, they release the last lot of animals, completely emptying the zoo. Note 1: This is the first episode to have a contestant replaced in the 2nd round, this being Violet, a gazelle contestant who was intentionally ejected by Chudd in Round 1, before she was supposed to be, and was replaced by Dale, a kangaroo contestant. Note 2: Rory, a lion contestant was the first contestant to just sit in the first round without answering a single question, possibly being already aware of the fact that the 2 lowest scorers at the end of the first two rounds would face elimination, earning him his freedom. Note 3: Kira is the only contestant in the NA version of Skatoony to score 10 points in under 45 seconds." Extra: Behind the Scenes - Chudd and Earl discuss bloopers that occur during the shooting of an average show.	Same Sound Name Round	Hoo Flung Dung!	10/10 (under 45 seconds and no deal)	10/10 (7/10 at half, refused deal)	Kira	Matthew
9	"Hoo Loves You, Baby!"	January 6, 2011 (French Teletoon); January 13, 2011 (English Teletoon)	Courtney (Emilie-Claire Barlow)	Eliminated 2nd Round	Hoo falls in love and runs off with Monty, a contestant with a hairy face (mistaking him for a lady) after he is eliminated in the first round. Chudd, Earl and the contestants, including guest star Courtney chase him to the jungle, but get attacked by a scorpion, which to Chudd is a giant. But Hoo shows up and stomps the scorpion. But Monty's hair explodes right off his face after too much stress, and leaves, much to Hoo's dismay. Note: This is the only episode where the yellow square is occupied during Round 3 (NA only); Extra: During the Commercial Break - Bigfoot passes gas every time beans are mentioned.	Same Sound Name Round	Hoo Flung Dung!	10/10 (6/10, at half, accepted deal)	7/10 (2/10 at half, accepted deal)	Ethan	Elena
10	"Quiziatori Gladihost"	January 13, 2011 (French Teletoon); January 27, 2011 (English Teletoon)	Leshawna (Novie Edwards)	Eliminated 2nd Round	Chudd is forced to compete for his job by Charles after Headly Diddly Dee, a Scottish contestant attempts to usurp him, ala Roman gladiator style. The first round begins with only five contestants instead of six. Note 1: Headly Diddly Dee is the third contestant to quit the show, because just like Scabz in "Skeleton Crew in Da House", he left before the first round started. Note 2: Guest star Leshawna (Rooks in UK) was originally in the yellow square, but after Headly left, she moved into the red square. Extra: Behind the Scenes - Chudd discusses the live-action filming process behind each episode.	Same Sound Name Round	DangerBox	10/10 (7/10 at half, refused deal)	10/10 (8/10 at half, no deal)	Nestor	Luke
11	"Superheroes"	January 20, 2011 (French Teletoon); February 3, 2011 (English Teletoon)	Chef Hatchet known as 'Super Chef'. (Clé Bennett)	Eliminated 2nd Round	Today, the show is having a superhero theme. Also, a series of upgrades to the Skatoony set commissioned by Charles/Tony goes awry, leading to the quizblock flying off into the air via a rocket booster. But Guts Glory and his hired sidekick and guest star Chef Hatchet (Wasp Boy in UK) save the day. Note: Chef Hatchet is the first non-contestant and Total Drama character to be in the show, since Chris McLean was a contestant in the Season 3 episode "Pop Video". Extra: Behind the Scenes - Chudd explains the animation process behind each episode.	Wear in the World?	Egg Noggin!	10/10 (8/10 at half, no deal)	10/10 (7/10 at half, accepted deal)	Asher	Georgia
12	"Dinosaur"	January 27, 2011 (French Teletoon); February 10, 2011 (English Teletoon)	Ezekiel (Peter Oldring)	Eliminated 2nd Round	Charles' newest invention causes Chudd, Earl and the quizblock to be sent back to the prehistoric times. The second round is played with only three players as a result of Gerrett the Parrot, one of the contestants devolving into a dinosaur, and had to be ejected. Note: T-Bone was seen behind the cavemen as you see closely. Note 2: This is the only episode where Chudd doesn't hang the picture to the picture, due to being frozened with Earl; Extra: After the show: Chudd, Earl and Charles says: is almost the final episode of the first season of Skatoony.	Draw What You Hear, and Shout Out When You Know What You've Drawn!	Egg Noggin!	9/10 (3/10 at half, rejected deal)	10/10 (6/10 at half, accepted deal)	Tyler	Stephanie
13	"Hooray for Bollywood"	February 3, 2011 (French Teletoon); February 17, 2011 (English Teletoon)	Justin (Adam Reid)	Eliminated 2nd Round	Inspired by Ranjit, a film star contestant who is eliminated in the first round, the show takes on a Bollywood musical theme, much to Charles'/Tony's chagrin. Meanwhile, Atilla the Hun, one of the contestants, threatens to destroy the set if he doesn't win the third round. But when he loses, he destroys it anyway, but Chudd and Earl use their new-found Bollywood music to stop him. Note 1: Atilla was the only contestant to be catapulted by other means, that were not by the quizblock. Note 2 The NA version is the only episode to have all the kid contestant names begin with the same letter.	Same Sound Name Round	Fast Food	10/10 (7/10 at half, accepted deal)	10/10 (7/10 at half, rejected deal)	Andrew	Emma

=== Season 2 ===
No. in overall	No. in season	Title	Airdate	Guest Contestant (NA and JP only)	Guest Result (NA and JP only)	Plot Arc	Round 2 Challenge	Round 3 Challenge	Quiz Champ Challenge Result	UK Quiz Champ Challenge Result	Winner in NA	Winner in UK
14	1	"Body Swap"	April 19, 2012	Dakota (Carleigh Beverly)	Unfairly kicked out 1st Round, then Eliminated 2nd Round (due to Fernando Fernando Fernando swapping bodies with her)	Fernando Fernando Fernando, the Mexican magician contestant, is eliminated in the first round, but in a desperate bid to win the grand prize, uses his magic body-swapping trick to swap bodies with the other animated contestants, including guest star Dakota (NA only), and contestant Taylor (John in UK) that moves on to the final round, and even makes Chudd and Earl swap bodies as well! However, in the end he is caught because Earl in Chudd's body asked Taylor (John in UK) if it was really Fernando in her/his body, and forced to restore everyone back to normal. Note 1: Roland Landlubber became the first contestant to compete in two different episodes. Note 2: Dakota was the first Total Drama character to be unfairly kicked out of the 1st round, because of Fernando Fernando Fernando swapping bodies with her. Note 3: Because of his body-swapping tricks, Fernando Fernando Fernando, in the body of contestant Taylor who made it to the final round, was the first toon contestant to play the Skatoony Quiz Champ Challenge. Note 4: This episode references the Disney film Freaky Friday.	Alphabet Soup	The DangerGrid of Doom	1/10 due to Fernando Fernando Fernando, 10/10 (5/10 at half, accepted deal)	1/10 due to Fernando Fernando Fernando, 10/10 (7/10 at half, refused deal)	Taylor	John
15	2	"Sports Academy"	April 22, 2012	Lightning (Tyrone Savage)	Eliminated 1st Round	In order to make some money, Charles/Tony opens a sports academy, and Hoo is determined to be good at any sport. Note: This is the first episode to not feature at least 1 female player. Note 2: Rex is good at any sport and wants to win the Skatoony Quiz Champ Challenge, but got stopped by The Earl.	Throw If You Know	Hoo Flung Dung!	10/10 (6/10 at half, accepted deal)	10/10 (4/10 at half, rejected deal)	Mark	Jim
16	3	"Space: The Final Souffle"	April 29, 2012	Cody (Jun'ichi Kanemaru) and Sierra (Aki Kanada) (JP only)	Eliminated 2nd round	After a chef contestant's souffle goes bang, Chudd, Earl and the contestants are launched into outer space! Note: First episode not to have a guest contestant. Note 2: Geoff, a green gas contestant explodes when flames, activated cookers and fire are near him. Note 3: This is the first appearance of the Galactic Garbage Ship. Note 4: This is the only episode to have a couple as a guest contestant in Skatoony Japan. Note 5: This is the only episode to reveal that Peter Oldring did not voice Cody and Annick Obonsawin did not voice Sierra, however, Jun'ichi Kanemaru voiced Cody and Aki Kanada voiced Sierra in Skatoony Japan	Blindfold Buffet	Fast Food	10/10 (7/10 at half, refused deal)	10/10 (8/10 at half, no deal)	Joey	Dan
17	4	"Pre-School Problem"	May 6, 2012	No guest	No guest result	Charles/Tony decides that Skatoony will now be only all about fun for babies and toddlers. But when Oop-de Doop, a contestant, is eliminated in the second round for cheating, his narrator makes him create evil beastly monsters to kill them all! Now, it's up to the babies to stop Oop-de Doop. Note 1: The Super Smile Gang were the second contestant group made up of 2 or more contestants, the others being Katie and Sadie in Season 1 episode "Xcqankly". Note 2: Two is the first contestant to intentionally not answer properly in Bang on or Bogus. Note 3: Second episode not to have a guest contestant Note 4: Creator James Fox's own two daughters did some voices in the UK version of this episode. Silly Note: The fighting numbers should have added to 43, not 42.	Cheery Tunes	The DangerGrid of Doom	9/10 (3/10 at half, accepted deal)	9/10 (3/10 at half, accepted deal)	Josh	Alisha
18	5	"Trash Talk"	May 20, 2012	Izzy (Katie Crown)	Eliminated 2nd Round	Charles/Tony complains about the trashy mess that Lid-Face, a garbage can contestant, is making in the studio. After getting eliminated in the first round, Zammo, a rat, and his buddies decide to recycle the trash - but they overdo it and soon start to recycle the Skatoony studio and the show transforms into a Tooskany Studio, with everybody except Chudd and contestants Jacob and Nicole (Bran and Day Day in UK) getting their body parts mixed and matched! Note 1: First and only time the normal Quiz Champ Challenge and Earl's Halfway Deal aren't played. Note 2: Izzy appears as a contestant again in this show, despite not being on Total Drama Revenge of the Island. However, she was on the same series as a cameo. Note 3: This is the only episode after Season 1 where a kid contestant moves to a spot on the quiz block previously occupied by a cartoon contestant.	Draw What You Hear, and Shout Out When You Know What You've Drawn!	Egg Noggin!	7/10 (3/10 at half, accepted deal)	10/10 (7/10 at half, accepted deal)	Jacob	Bran
19	6	"Vikings"	May 27, 2012	Brick (Jon Cor)	Eliminated 2nd Round	When a sergeant contestant, his son Skad, and guest star Brick (Stelly in UK) fill the studio with onions, the audience start crying and make a flood of tears. As a result, a Viking longboat appears and the Vikings on it kidnap the contestants! It's up to Chudd and Earl to disguise themselves as Vikings and save the contestants. In the end, Hoo shows up, angry at the Vikings for taking his place in Hoo Flung Dung!, and saves the contestants by tossing the Vikings away. Note: This is the 1st episode that 3 female kids were featured in Season 2.	Draw What You Hear, and Shout Out When You Know What You've Drawn!	Viking Flung Dung!	10/10 (5/10 at half, accepted deal)	9/10 (5/10 at half, accepted deal)	Kate	Gracie
20	7	"Stop the Pop"	June 3, 2012	Silent B	Unfairly eliminated 1st Round (because he's silent)	A fancy pop star called Goldie Pops appears at Skatoony, and she takes over Chudd's job as the quiz host, and then the whole show, including her personal game Goldie Pops' Same Sound Name Round (Goldie Pops' Deeply Dipping Game in UK)! But very soon, Earl becomes suspicious when he hears a familiar voice come out of 'her' mouth, and figures out that it's really Chudd's rival, Headly Diddly Dee in disguise. Note 1: This is the 2nd episode that three female kids were featured in Season 2. Note 2: Velma (from Scooby-Doo)'s quote "Jinkies!" is heard in the UK version of this episode. Note 3: Silent B is the second Total Drama contestant to be unfairly kicked out first round, the other being Dakota on "Body Swap", because Fernando Fernando Fernando swapped bodies with her to stay in the game. Note 4: T-Bone is the third contestant to have two separate competitions. Note 5: This is the second episode where Freezee melts in the UK. Note 6: This is the only episode to not have Chudd quiz the contestants.	Goldie Pops' Same Sound Name Round (originally Draw What You Hear, and Shout Out When You Know What You've Drawn!)	Hoo Flung Dung!	9/10 (4/10 at half, accepted deal)	10/10 (5/10 at half, accepted deal)	Erin	Alice
21	8	"Inside La Puck/Eagle-Eyes"	June 10, 2012	Jo (Laurie Elliott)	Eliminated 1st Round	Charles/Tony is eating Chudd and Earl's burgers and fries they're serving to the audience. When Chudd accidentally wishes to see the inside of Charles's stomach, a genie contestant grants his wish, and Chudd, Earl and the contestants get shrunk and enter Charles'/Tony's stomach, so now they have to get out! Note 1: This is the 3rd episode that 3 female kids were featured in Season 2. Note 2: The NA version of this episode features the most female contestants with 5.	Color Me Quizzy	Stinky Drinky	10/10 (4/10 at half, accepted deal)	6/10 (2/10 at half, accepted deal)	Ally	Lozzie
22	9	"It Could Be You!"	June 17, 2012	No guest	No guest result	The show begins with only the kid contestants. Today, Chudd and Earl decide to do Skatoony live from someone's house to find the cartoon contestants. Their destination is a suburban house, and two children and their mom serve as the toon contestants. But trouble strikes when the mom and the children bring in the army to destroy them as revenge for being eliminated! It's up to Chudd and Earl to stop them. Note 1: Burp is the first contestant on the show to require another contestant to define their answers. Note 2: Mom is the second contestant to intentionally not answer correctly in Bang on or Bogus, the first was Two in "Pre-School Problem". Note 3: This is the third episode not to feature a guest contestant.	Throw If You Know	The DangerGrid of Doom	10/10 (6/10 at half, accepted deal)	8/10 (4/10 at half, refused deal)	Chris	Renai
23	10	"I Spy, You Quiz"	June 24, 2012	Staci (Ashley Peters)	Eliminated 2nd Round	A mobile phone mix-up with Chudd and Agent Carruthers, a spy contestant, who is eliminated in the first round, leads to a super evil plot to destroy Showtown! And the evil mastermind turns out to be Charles La Puck (Tony Eagle-Eyes in UK)! Note: Most of the contestants in the episode seemed to be aware of guest star Staci being a compulsive liar.	Quick Pic Picking!	Hoo Flung Dung!	7/10 (2/10 at half, accepted deal)	10/10 (6/10 at half, refused deal)	Kyle	Weiry
24	11	"Out to Sea"	July 1, 2012	Dawn (Caitlynne Medrek)	Eliminated 2nd Round	A mishap involving grease sends the studio sliding like mad through the streets of Showtown and then, it crash lands onto the beach, sending Chudd, Earl and the quiz block out into the ocean! Note: Sham-Sham is the second contestant, after Burp to require another contestant to define their answers. Note 2: In the NA version of this episode, one of the choices in Round 2, jam, was never correct.	Blindfold Buffet	Hoo Flung Dung!	9/10 (4/10 at half, refused deal)	7/10 (2/10 at half, refused deal)	Declan	Rachy
25	12	"Freakshow"	July 8, 2012	Sam (Brian Froud)	Eliminated 3rd Round	Fernando Fernando Fernando, the Mexican magician contestant and Xcqankly team up, and merge different animals to make new species like a snail and an owl and a frog and a penguin. But Chudd and Earl find they plan to merge humans with animals! Can they stop this dual catastrophe? Note 1: Sam is the second Total Drama character to make it to the third round. Note 2: This episode is part of Season 3 in the UK. Note 3: Both Fernando Fernando Fernando and Xcqankly each appear as contestants for the second time in this episode, being two of five contestants to do so, the others being Roland Landlubber, T-Bone and Izzy. Note 4: Xcqankly was the first contestant to sit out the second round, then face elimination. Note 5: This is the first episode where a kid contestant returns after being ejected and eliminated from the game. This will later happen in Pop Video, Café Le Quiz, and Host of Doom.	Animal Swap-a-Butt	Hoo Flung Dung!	8/10 (3/10 at half, accepted deal)	9/10 (4/10 at half, accepted deal)	Griffin	Jem
26	13	"Destination: Moon"	July 15, 2012	Cameron (Kevin Duhaney)	Eliminated 2nd Round	Charles/Tony decides to take Skatoony to the Moon, but they end up running into Colonel Zeppo, who makes them carve the moon into a sculpture of his girlfriend Margaret. Note 1: This episode is part of Season 3 in the UK. Note 2: Tank, a turtle contestant is a parody of "Teenage Mutant Ninja Turtles". Note 3: After round 3, Chudd sent contestant Madeline back into space for an apparent reason. The reason is because the other four contestants were in space as well. Note 4: This is the second appearance of the Galactic Garbage ship.	Draw What You Hear, and Shout Out When You Know What You've Drawn!	Egg Noggin!	7/10 (3/10 at half, accepted deal)	10/10 (3/10 at half, accepted deal)	Tyler	Jess

=== Season 3 ===
No. in overall	No. in season	Title	Airdate	Guest Contestant (NA only)	Guest Result (NA only)	Plot Arc	Round 2 Challenge	Round 3 Challenge	Quiz Champ Challenge Result	UK Quiz Champ Challenge Result	Winner in NA	Winner in UK
27	1	"Halloween"	October 21, 2012	Mike (Cory Doran)	Eliminated 2nd Round	Today is Halloween, but Charles/Tony bans everything that has to do with Halloween because he is scared of it all, but after Lucrezia, a witch contestant is eliminated second round, she sends Chudd, Earl and the quizblock into a vortex, which sends them to a spooky dimension ruled by a pair of monsters, who are friends of Lucrezia that force Chudd and Earl to be their personal entertainment and they turn contestant Declan (Otti in UK) into a baby ogre! Note: Frankie, a Frankenstein monster, became the third contestant, after Dakota and Silent B to be unfairly kicked off in the 1st round, since like Silent B, he did not voice his answers.	Color Me Quizzy	Stinky Drinky	10/10 (4/10 at half, accepted deal)	6/10 (4/10 at half, accepted deal)	Declan	Otti
28	2	"Stoopid Santa"	December 25, 2012	Zoey (Barbara Mamabolo)	Eliminated 2nd Round	Charles/Tony blows all of the money that the studio uses for prizes on an expensive summer vacation, so Chudd, Earl and the contestants including guest star Zoey, must convince Santa Clause who is a contestant that it is Christmas, so they can get a present to use as a prize for the winner. Will he believe them or will they end up on the naughty list? Note: Santa Clause became the sixth contestant to have two separate appearances on Skatoony.	Color Me Quizzy	Mystery Pie Roulette	8/10 (4/10 at half, accepted deal)	10/10 (3/10 at half, refused deal)	Iris	Sooks
29	3	"CJ's Birthday"	February 3, 2013	Katie (Stephanie Anne Mills) and Sadie (Lauren Lipson)	Eliminated 2nd Round	Today is the birthday of Charles'/Tony's nephew CJ/TJ and he is a contestant on today's show. Charles/Tony threatens to fire Chudd unless he gets his nephew a present, but Chudd and Earl give him a 'pony', which is really Xcqankly wearing a saddle. After the break, a commercial for a new substance called Super Uber Grow plays, and CJ/TJ uses too much of it, and during the third round, his hair grows into a monster, and attacks. In the end, Earl and Xcqankly save the day by eating the hair monster, and CJ's/TJ's hair, making him bald. Note 1: Katie and Sadie appear as contestants again in this episode, although they did not compete on Total Drama Revenge of the Island, they did have a minor cameo. Note 2: All toon contestants - Katie and Sadie, CJ and Dabs Looman become four of ten contestants to have two appearances on Skatoony, the others being Roland Landlubber, Izzy, T-Bone, Fernando Fernando Fernando, Xcqankly and Santa Clause. Note 3: In the UK, When TJ got eliminated, there was an error in the factory. Instead of it saying, “Sweaty Footballers Socks Depot”, it said, “Faulty Bagpipe Superstore”.	Talkin' Backwards!	The DangerGrid of Doom	10/10 (5/10 at half, refused deal)	10/10 (6/10 at half, refused deal)	William	Frankie
30	4	"Amusement Park"	February 10, 2013	Scott (James Wallis)	Eliminated 2nd Round	Charles/Tony turns the Studio into an amusement park called Skatoony World of Thrills, and what starts as a fun day out turns into a rescue mission adventure! Note: Tafgar, the Viking leader from the Season 2 episode "Vikings", is a contestant in this episode.	Throw If You Know	Hoo Flung Dung!	10/10 (4/10 at half, rejected deal)	10/10 (4/10 at half, accepted deal)	Dakota	Niall
31	5	"Follow that Quizblock"	February 17, 2013	Heloise (Tabitha St. Germain)	Eliminated 1st Round	Hedley Diddley Dee, Chudd's rival, threatens to set the quizblock on a run, if he does not get Chudd's job as quiz show host, but the quizblock ends up on a run anyway, so Chudd and Earl must take chase to catch the quizblock, before it falls off of a cliff! Note 1: Heloise is the first Jimmy Two-Shoes character to be on the show. She is also the first Jimmy Two-Shoes character to be eliminated first round. Note 2: Nebby becomes the eleventh contestant to have two appearances on Skatoony. Note 3: In the UK, this marks the only time Freezee plays Skatoony without melting.	Talkin' Backwards!	Egg Noggin!	9/10 (3/10 at half, accepted deal)	10/10 (7/10 at half, accepted deal)	Kyle	Hammod
32	6	"Style Trial"	February 24, 2013	Anne Maria (Athena Karkanis)	Eliminated 2nd Round	Charles/Tony complains about how dull the style of Skatoony is, so he has Fernando Fernando Fernando magic a new audience. But instead, he makes a "nude" audience; which is the old audience without any clothes on! Can Chudd and Earl find something the audience can wear? Let's just hope they can! Note: The hairspray bottle Anne Maria pulls out in the NA version looks very similar to Izzy's perfume. Note 2: Flit became the second toon contestant to be seen flying away from the landing area, following Xcquankly.	Draw What You Hear, and Shout Out When You Know What You've Drawn!	Hoo Flung Dung!	10/10 (6/10 at half, refused deal)	10/10 (6/10 at half, accepted deal)	Arianna	Kezia
33	7	"Pop Video"	March 3, 2013	Chris MacLean (Christian Potenza)	Eliminated 1st Round	Today, Charles/Tony makes Skatoony a music video show as well as a quiz show! Note 1: Chris MacLean was not only the second non-camper contestant from Total Drama, but he was also the second contestant to not answer any questions in Round 1, then face elimination. Note 2: Scabz, from the Season 1 episode "Skeleton Crew in Da House", actually competed in this episode. Note 3: Dabs Looman becomes the first contestant to have three separate appearances on Skatoony. Note 4: This is the second episode where a kid contestant returns after being ejected and eliminated from the game. This happened in Freakshow, and will later happen in Café Le Quiz and Host of Doom.	Colourful Language	The DangerGrid of Doom	9/10 (4/10 at half, accepted deal)	10/10 (7/10 at half, accepted deal)	Andrea	India
34	8	"Quiz to the Future"	March 10, 2013	Jimmy Two-Shoes (Cory Doran)	Eliminated 1st Round	A futuristic contestant, Dan Blam, takes Chudd, Earl, and the other contestants to the 26th century, in a time machine built like the quizblock, where quizzing is banned, because of the belief that quizzing causes feuds. Note: Jimmy Two-Shoes is the second Jimmy Two-Shoes character to be on the show. He is also the second Jimmy Two-Shoes character to be eliminated first round, the first being Heloise.	Blinking Brain Box	The DangerGrid of Doom	10/10 (8/10 at half, no deal)	10/10 (6/10 at half, accepted deal)	Jonah	Emily
35	9	"Broke Charles"	March 17, 2013	Leshawna (Novie Edwards)	Eliminated 1st Round	The whole studio goes bust because Charles/Tony goes broke when he spends all his money on an expensive meal he had at a cafe. The studio closes down and Chudd, Earl, Charles/Tony and the contestants are all thrown onto the street. Chudd and Earl fill up a busking hat which nearly gets them killed by an angry mob, take a ride on a bus, but get kicked out when they get on the bad side of Doug's fleas, when it was really a hobo Charles/Tony complaining he had fleas, then they end up in a canyon filled with a family of hillbillies, who give Chudd and Earl their supply of diamonds for performing the quiz for them, restoring Charles'/Tony's wealth and re-opens the studio. Note 1: Leshawna appears as a contestant again in this show, despite not being on Total Drama Revenge of the Island. However, she was on that series as a minor cameo. Note 2: Both Atilla the Hun and Leshawna become two of thirteenth contestants to have two appearances on Skatoony. Note 3: Jesse Vesperse became the second contestant, after Xcquankly to sit out the 2nd round and then face elimination.	Color Me Quizzy	Stinky Drinky	6/10 (4/10 at half, refused deal)	10/10 (7/10 at half, refused deal)	Maxx	Pat
36	10	"In Your Dreams"	March 24, 2013	Beezy (Brian Froud)	Eliminated 3rd Round	After being put to sleep by Chudd and Earl's vacation slide show, Chudd, Earl and all the contestants are transported into a looney dream world, which almost leads to all of them being eaten by a giant baby! Note 1: Sven Streudel became the fourteenth contestant to have two appearances on Skatoony. Note 2: Roland Landlubber becomes the second contestant to have three separate appearances on Skatoony. Note 3: Beezy is the third Jimmy Two-Shoes character to be on Skatoony and is also now the third guest contestant to make it to the third round. Note 4: Unlike his other Jimmy Two-Shoes characters who were eliminated in the first round, Beezy was the first and only Jimmy Two-Shoes character to make it to the second and third rounds. Note 5: This is the only episode where Chudd doesn't explain the rules of the game. As he was distracted by his holiday slideshow, Earl explains them instead.	Animal Swap-a-Butt	Hoo Flung Dung!	10/10 (7/10 at half, declined deal)	8/10 (4/10 at half, accepted deal)	Rebecca	Jacko
37	11	"Unusual Suspects"	March 31, 2013	Owen (Scott McCord)	Eliminated 2nd Round	Charles/Tony prepares a new prize for the show; a model of him made entirely from chocolate! But it is suddenly stolen! Who could the culprit be? Note 1: Owen appears as a contestant again in this episode, although he did not compete on Total Drama Revenge of the Island, he did have a cameo appearance. Note 2: Both Owen and Hedley Diddley Dee, (in disguise) became two of now sixteen contestants to have two appearances on Skatoony. Note 3: Hedley Diddley Dee, in disguise, actually became the second toon contestant to play the Skatoony Quiz Champ Challenge, as contestant Andrew (Bethany in UK) who should have played was removed until he was discovered to be the thief. Note 4: Jordan is the only kid contestant to not buzz in during a round.	Draw What You Hear, and Shout Out When You Know What You've Drawn!	The DangerGrid of Doom	10/10 (3/10 at half, declined deal)	10/10 (5/10 at half, refused deal)	Andrew	Bethany
38	12	"Café Le Quiz"	April 7, 2013	Chef Hatchet (Clé Bennett)	Eliminated 2nd Round	After a bunny chews a cable underneath the quizblock, it inadvertently ejects all of the original contestants. Which means that Chudd and Earl must go to Café Le Quiz to find 6 new contestants, and also take over as the new chefs of Café Le Quiz, and things go bad when Chudd and the quizblock end up on their way into a food incinerator! Note 1: All 3 toon characters - Zeppo, Zammo and Chef Hatchet (Lucrezia in UK) were contestants for the second time in this episode, thus making them three of now nineteen contestants to accomplish this. Note 2: Chef Hatchet was the third and first guest contestant to sit out the 2nd round, then face elimination. Note 3: Zeppo was the first and only contestant to receive half a point during a round. Note 4: This episode alone holds the record for the most ejections in an episode, with the total number of ejections being 11 contestants (5 kid contestants, Freezee, Super Smile Gang, Dolph, Zammo, Zeppo, and Chef Hatchet/Lucrezia). Note 5: This is the third episode where a kid contestant returns after being ejected and eliminated from the game. This happened in Freakshow and Pop Video, and will later happen in and Host of Doom.	Color Me Quizzy	Mystery Pie Roulette	9/10 (2/10 at half, accepted deal)	10/10 (5/10 at half, refused deal)	Nick	Amy
39	13	"Host of Doom"	April 14, 2013	Lucius Heinous VII (Seán Cullen)	Eliminated 1st Round	The Dangergrid of Doom takes over Chudd's job as quiz show host, because Charles plans to take Skatoony into the 21st Century, by upgrading security, and painting the set black and white, but becomes the main antagonist when he plans to turn everyone into robots! Can Chudd save the day? Note 1: Lucius Heinous VII became the fourth Jimmy Two-Shoes character to be on Skatoony, and he was also the third Jimmy Two Shoes character to be eliminated first round. The only character that wasn't was Beezy. Note 2: This is the first episode that the Danger Grid of Doom and Hoo the Gorilla appeared together, it also seems that they are hostile to each other. Note 3: This is the fourth and final episode where a kid contestant returns after being ejected and eliminated from the game. This happened in Freakshow and Pop Video, and Café Le Quiz.	Blinking Brain Box	Hoo Flung Dung	10/10 (7/10 at half, refused deal)	8/10 (3/10 at half, accepted deal)	Scotty	Lulu
