= Backyard Science =

- Presented by: Dana Kronental; Jason Smith (Season 1); Tarun Victor Gordon (Season 2-3)
- Country of origin: Australia
- Original language: English
- No. of series: 3
- No. of episodes: 78

Production
- Running time: 30 minutes
- Production company: Beyond Television Productions

Original release
- Network: Seven Network; ABC Kids
- Release: 28 August 2003 – 2007

Backyard Science is an Australian educational children's television show based on the Dorling Kindersley book of the same name that aired from 28 August 2003 until 2007. The series was originally commissioned by Super RTL and TVOntario, and had 78 episodes produced in three seasons. Some airings split this into 156 15-minute episodes.

In this series, children experiment with everyday items in order to make something fun and practical and also provide scientific insights in a child's world.

== International distribution ==
The show is broadcast in overseas markets including:

- Serbia (Nauka iz dvorišta) Ultra
- Canada (TVOKids)
- Croatia (Mali znanstvenici) RTL Kockica
- Czech Republic (Věda je zábava)
- Germany (WOW – Die Entdeckerzone)
- Hungary (Da Vinci Learning)
- Indonesia (Spacetoon)
- India (Disney India, Hungama TV and National Geographic Channel)
- Israel (LOGI Channel, Titled as "Mitahat La'af" – מתחת לאף)
- Italy (K2)
- Latin America (Boomerang)
- Malaysia (Astro TVIQ)
- Pakistan (PTV)
- Poland (Da Vinci Learning)
- Romania (Da Vinci Learning)
- Russia (Da Vinci Learning)
- Turkey (Da Vinci Learning and Yumurcak TV)
- UAE (e-Junior)
- UK (Toonami and POP!) have carried the English-language episodes; a Scots Gàidhlig version, Saidheans Sporsail, hosted by Allen MacDonald and Kerry Anne MacLeod, airs on BBC Alba.
- USA (Discovery Kids, under the title Crash! Bang! Splat!)

== Personalities ==
The program featured Australian actress Sophie Lowe, Daniela Marie and her brother John, comedian Genevieve Fricker, and twins Lucas Hejtmanek and Priscilla Hejtmanek.
