= Adult Swim (Australia) =

Australian television programming block

- Country: Australia
- Broadcast area: Australia; New Zealand (formerly)
- Headquarters: Sydney, New South Wales, Australia

Programming
- Language: English
- Picture format: 576i (SDTV)

Ownership
- Owner: Warner Bros. Discovery Asia-Pacific; Madman Entertainment

History
- Launched: December 2005; 1 September 2016 (relaunch) on 9Go!
- Closed: November 2019

Adult Swim was an Australian adult-oriented free-to-air television block that was last aired from Saturday and Sunday nights on 9Go!. It was originally a separate network that shared channel space with Cartoon Network, starting in 2003 until 31 December 2007.

== History ==
Adult Swim was first broadcast on Cartoon Network Australia in December 2005 before it was taken down on 31 December 2007. The block is no longer shown on Cartoon Network, however comedy shows started airing on The Comedy Channel on 11 March 2008. The block returned with Robot Chicken and Harvey Birdman, Attorney at Law, in March 2008, with Aqua Teen Hunger Force joining the programming on 1 July. The Boondocks also airs on the same channel although it is not under the Adult Swim banner and instead airs separately. Moral Orel has premiered on Australian television. Titan Maximum also premiered on 6 January 2010. Frisky Dingo joined the Comedy Channel's "Animania" line-up as of 21 July 2010. Tim and Eric Awesome Show Great Job premiered on 26 January 2011 along with Childrens Hospital which, unlike the American broadcast, aired completely uncensored with profanity intact.

Most of the anime series have not returned to television; however, an anime block on the Australian Sci-Fi Channel, Animax, aired shows previously aired on both Adult Swim USA and Australia. The block featured Ghost in the Shell: Stand Alone Complex, Bleach, Air Gear, Inuyasha, Cowboy Bebop, and Blood+. The block ceased operations in 2016.

The new incarnation also premiered a lot of other Adult Swim shows including Moral Orel, Titan Maximum, Robot Chicken: Star Wars, Frisky Dingo, Tim and Eric Awesome Show Great Job and Childrens Hospital (airing uncensored with profanity intact), along with the latest additions but aired at a different time, Metalocalypse and The Venture Bros, the latter making it the third show with Aqua Teen Hunger Force and Harvey Birdman to have been aired on both the old and the new block.

Some series that aired on Adult Swim have been released to Region 4 DVD by Madman Entertainment, including shows that have never been shown on Australian television before, such as Metalocalypse, Minoriteam, 12 oz. Mouse, Assy McGee, Xavier Renegade Angel. The Aqua Teen Hunger Force Colon Movie Film for Theaters has also been quietly released to DVD.

Some Adult Swim shows have also aired on SBS 2, and in October 2013 full episodes and short clips were made available on their website. Shortly after, they started to sell their DVDs on the website.

In October 2013, Turner Broadcasting in partnership with MCM Media and Movideo launched a video on demand service Adult Swim Australia. The initial offering includes a library of 1500 Adult Swim videos including full episodes and short clips.

In June 2016, Nine Network and Turner Broadcasting System signed a 2-year deal to broadcast Adult Swim programs on 9Go! every Saturday and Sunday night. Starting 1 September 2016, Rick and Morty aired on Thursday nights. Adult Swim aired their own Fish Center.

From late 2017 until 2018 Madman Entertainment started streaming Adult Swim on their anime streaming website Animelab.

Despite starting off it broadcasting in both Australia and New Zealand, Adult Swim does not currently air in New Zealand.

In August 2017, Adult Swim Australia created an Instagram page promoting and posting videos of their content.

In November 2019, Adult Swim stopped broadcasting on 9Go!.

In May 2022, Stan started streaming Adult Swim shows.

== See also ==
- Adult Swim (United States)
- Adult Swim (Canadian TV channel)
- Adult Swim (British and Irish TV programming block)
