= Cartoonito (UK and Ireland) =

British children's television channel

- Logo used since 2022
- Country: United Kingdom
- Broadcast area: United Kingdom; Ireland; Malta
- Network: Cartoon Network Too (2006–2007); Boomerang (2009–2010s); Cartoon Network (2022–present)
- Headquarters: London, England

Programming
- Language: English
- Picture format: 1080i HDTV (downscaled to 576i for the SD feed)

Ownership
- Owner: Skydance Corporation
- Parent: Skydance UK
- Sister channels: Animal Planet; Boomerang; Cartoon Network; CNN International; Discovery Channel; Discovery History; Discovery Science; Discovery Turbo; DMAX; Food Network; Investigation Discovery; Quest; Quest Red; Really; TLC; TNT Sports

History
- Launched: 4 September 2006; 20 years ago (as a block on Cartoon Network Too); 24 May 2007; 19 years ago (as a channel); 1 March 2022; 4 years ago (as a block on Cartoon Network)
- Replaced: Cartoon Network Too (original version)
- Closed: 28 May 2007; 19 years ago (as a block on Cartoon Network Too)

Links
- Website: www.cartoonito.co.uk (dead link, redirects to its YouTube channel)

Availability

Terrestrial
- See separate section

Cartoonito is a British pay television channel which targets children between the ages of 3 and 6. It is operated by Skydance Corporation under its UK division. Unlike Cartoon Network and Boomerang, Cartoonito does not have a +1 timeshift in the UK. The channel is available in high definition on Sky Stream and Virgin Media.

== History ==
=== Launch as a block on Cartoon Network Too (2006–2007) ===
Former logo with purple eyes, used from 2006 to 2018; the second version used until 2022 featured black eyes

On 14 August 2006, Turner Broadcasting System Europe announced they would launch a preschool-oriented strand for Cartoon Network Too known as Cartoonito, which would launch on 4 September, running from 6:00 AM to 3:00 PM. The block also included interstitials featuring Cartoonito's mascots teaching French to its viewers, a unique selling point and the only preschool service in the UK to do so.

=== Relaunch as a full channel (2007–2017) ===
On 2 May 2007, Turner announced that they would expand Cartoonito to a full-time network on 24 May 2007. This allowed Cartoon Network Too to merge and replace Toonami, allowing the Cartoonito channel to launch in the former Cartoon Network Too slot.

On 24 May 2007, at 3:00 AM, Cartoonito launched as a standalone channel on Sky channel 619, with the original version of Cartoon Network Too closing at 7:00 PM the previous day. The channel was broadcast from 3:00 AM until 7:00 PM and originally timeshared with Turner Classic Movies 2 (later became Turner Classic Movies +1 on 13 August 2013).

In early 2008, Cartoonito's website was redesigned.

On 28 August 2009, it was announced that a Cartoonito block would air on Boomerang from 9:00 AM to 10:30 AM on school-term weekdays beginning in September. The block aimed to introduce the Cartoonito brand to viewers who had never seen the programmes the channel offered.

On 1 March 2010, it was announced that Cartoonito would be added to Virgin Media by April. The channel was added on 25 March and by May had become the most widely distributed preschool pay television network in the United Kingdom. With its addition to Virgin Media, the channel's broadcast hours was changed, from 3:00 AM until 7:00 PM to 4:00 AM until 8:00 PM.

On 26 October 2013, Cartoonito was launched on BT TV, and Cartoonito launched on Plusnet in May 2015. On 15 December 2016, Cartoonito was added to TalkTalk.

=== Introduction of 24 hour broadcasting and 2018 UK rebrand (2017–2022) ===
During the premiere of Daisy & Ollie in the UK, Cartoonito shifted its aspect ratio to 16:9 widescreen on 1 November 2017. The channel began broadcasting a 24 hour schedule on 15 January 2018. On 2 March 2018, the channel rebranded with an updated website. The logo remained the same, with the only difference being that the eyes were changed from purple to black.

=== 2022 UK rebrand and strand relaunch on Cartoon Network (2022–present) ===
On 1 February 2022, Cartoonito rebranded with the new 2021 logo and bumpers. Following the rebrand, a Cartoonito block launched on its sister channel Cartoon Network, airing weekdays from 9:00 AM until 10:00 AM (was briefly extend to end at 11:00 AM in mid-2022).

On 1 October 2023, Cartoonito transitioned to utilising the same style of promos as Discovery's free-to-air channels, although it remains a pay television network.

On 27 September 2024, an HD simulcast of Cartoonito launched on Virgin Media alongside Boomerang HD, replacing the SD feed on the service.

== Availability ==
=== Cable ===
- Virgin Media UK: Channel 706 (HD)

=== Online ===
- Now TV: Watch live

=== Satellite ===
- Sky: Channel 610

=== Terrestrial ===
- BT TV UK: Channel 471

== See also ==
- Cartoon Network Too
- Cartoonito
- Boomerang (British and Irish TV channel)
- Cartoon Network (United Kingdom and Ireland)
- Toonami (United Kingdom and Ireland)
