= Cartoon Network (United Kingdom and Ireland) =

Pay television channel

- Country: United Kingdom; Ireland
- Broadcast area: United Kingdom; Ireland; Malta
- Headquarters: 160 Old Street, London, England

Programming
- Language: English
- Picture format: 1080i HDTV (downscaled to 576i for the SD feed)
- Timeshift service: Cartoon Network +1

Ownership
- Owner: Skydance Corporation
- Parent: Skydance UK
- Key people: Sean Gorman (Head of Creative, Kids Brands, EMEA at Skydance Corporation); Vanessa Brookman (SVP Kids and Family EMEA at Skydance Corporation and Co-president of Hanna-Barbera Studios Europe); Sam Register (President of Hanna-Barbera Studios Europe)
- Sister channels: Animal Planet; Boomerang; Cartoonito; CNN International; Discovery Channel; Discovery History; Discovery Science; Discovery Turbo; DMAX; Food Network; Investigation Discovery; Quest; Quest Red; Really; TLC; TNT Sports

History
- Launched: 17 September 1993; 33 years ago (as Cartoon Network Europe); 15 October 1999; 27 years ago (original Pan-European Feed becomes UK/Eire only, Encrypted on Astra 1C)

Links
- Website: Cartoon Network's channel on YouTube

Availability

Terrestrial
- See separate section

Cartoon Network (commonly abbreviated as CN) is a British pay television channel aimed at children which airs animated programming targeting children and young aged 6 to 12. It is run by Skydance Corporation under its UK division. The channel primarily airs animated programming.

The channel initially launched on 17 September 1993 as a larger pan-European feed, serving the UK market along with Western and Northern Europe. In August 1999, the pan-European aspect of Cartoon Network Europe was spun-off as a new feed with an identical schedule to Cartoon Network UK (the former pan-European feed). Cartoon Network UK completely ceased being a pan-European feed on 15 October 1999, which was when it was scrambled with Videocrypt and the launch of the UK only version of TNT. The pan-European feed continued to shadow Cartoon Network UK's schedule until 2001. The pan-European feed excluded shows such as Dragon Ball Z and Angela Anaconda and were substituted, as Cartoon Network did not have the pan-European broadcasting rights to these shows, only the rights for the UK and the Netherlands.

== History ==
=== Pre-launch ===
The original Cartoon Network logo, used from 17 September 1993 to 11 April 2005. The logo is still used today on some occasions.

In October 1992, the original Cartoon Network channel was launched in Atlanta, Georgia in the US. Cartoon Network was created in response to Turner Entertainment acquiring MGM's animation library in 1986 and the acquisition of the Hanna-Barbera animation studio and cartoon library in 1991. As a result of Turner purchasing MGM's Cartoon and Film library, Warner Bros. pre-1948 content was also acquired, including early Looney Tunes and Merrie Melodies shorts. At launch in the United States, Cartoon Network had an 8,500-hour cartoon library, and became the first channel dedicated strictly to cartoons.

With the Cartoon Network's large animation library being in high demand in Western Europe and as a response to consumer demand, Turner Broadcasting System Europe announced in March 1993 that they would launch Cartoon Network in Europe. The channel would be located within the Astra 1C satellite, itself launching in May 1993 on board an Ariane 42L rocket from Kourou, French Guiana.

=== Launch (1993–1996) ===
Cartoon Network Europe officially launched on 17 September 1993, being the third version of the channel to launch after the Latin American feed (which launched in April). It launched only less than 12 months after the original American version and only 16 days after Nickelodeon. The channel was broadcast free-to-air throughout Europe, Middle East, North Africa and Nordic territories, and timeshared with TNT Classic Movies, of which it would air from 5:00 AM–7:00 PM and TNT would take over afterward. In the UK, while rival Nickelodeon was a pay-TV network through the Sky Multichannels service, Cartoon Network remained free-to-air in the country. During the channel's first day on air, it aired Droopy's Guide to the Cartoon Network, the CN launch show, at 5pm CET.

Strands that existed on the channel included the morning block "The Morning Crew"; there was also "Super Chunk", which showed back to back episodes of one show for two hours between 1 pm and 3 pm on Sunday afternoons. Another strand was "The Longest Day", in which Cartoon Network ran for an extra four hours until 11:00 PM in June 1994, every year beginning in 1994. This slot was dedicated to full-length cartoon movies. The first theme was the Checkerboard theme, which showed graphics from its US counterpart and lasted until 1999. The Checkerboard branding package was developed by Hatmaker Studios, now merged and part of its sister company - Corey, McPherson and Nash.

By 1996, the combined CN/TNT channel slot was available in over 31 million homes in over 33 territories.

=== Expansion (1996-1999) ===
In September 1996, Cartoon Network expanded its broadcast hours by two, ending broadcasts at 9:00 PM. Beginning in December 1996, a 24-hour version of both Cartoon Network and TNT was launched on the Astra 1G satellite an aired on select European digital cable providers, although it was not initially available in the UK as the timesharing version remained on all providers in the country until the 24-hour version launched in the UK on CableTel beginning in 1997. Also, in February 1997, Dutch cable provider A2000/KTA added the 24-hour Cartoon Network and TNT channels to its programming lineup.

On 15 November 1998, the 24-hour version was added to ONdigital and remained until the service's collapsed on 1 May 2002. A month later, it was added to the Sky Digital satellite platform on the Astra 2A satellite. On the same day, a one-hour timeshift service, Cartoon Network 2, also launched. In March 1999, Cartoon Network 2 was renamed to Cartoon Network Plus to better represent its status as a timeshift service.

=== Separation from Pan-European version ===
During the late 90s and the early 2000s, Turner Entertainment Networks International started localising their channels to suit different audiences across different countries around Europe, the Middle East, and Africa.

This soon concluded on 15 October 1999 when Cartoon Network Europe officially split to focus exclusively on the United Kingdom and Ireland markets. The shared transponder analogue feed on Astra 1C became scrambled with VideoCrypt and Cartoon Network officially became encrypted, becoming a pay service. The separation of feeds was to allow Turner Classic Movies to replace TNT Classic Movies in all territories except for analogue satellite and cable in the UK and Ireland, where a standalone TNT channel would replace it. Before this date, the European version of Cartoon Network moved to Sirius II to serve Central Europe in August 1999 and the French and Spanish version launched at the same time the same month, leaving the ex pan-European version on Astra 1C acting as a de facto free to air secondary/transitional European feed for countries preparing to switchover to their own newly launched local versions of Cartoon Network up until encryption in October 1999. TNT changed its programming from classic movies to general entertainment as the movies were moved to TCM. The new version of TNT ended its run on 1 July 2000 and TCM took over its former space on Analogue satellite and some cable providers, and was removed entirely on those that already broadcast TCM.

=== Post-pan European split ===
After the pan-European split, Cartoon Network revamped on 15 October 1999 with the launch of a unique and more intensive variant of the "Powerhouse" theme which had shapes and tiles with lines and footage of characters from various shows shown on Cartoon Network. This lasted until 1 September 2002 in the UK and was used throughout Europe on 30 September 2002. The European version of Powerhouse was produced by now-defunct London based animation and design studio AMGFX. A DJ theme was used during the AKA Cartoon Network programming block, bumpers include a live-action DJ scratching a record, which affects the playback of a cartoon clip.

On 30 June 2001, the analogue feed on Astra 1C of Cartoon Network and TCM ceased broadcasting. Sky's analogue service would later fully shut down on 27 September that year.

On 14 December 2001, Cartoon Network Interactive was launched via the Sky Gamestar area, and included two games, Samurai Jack in Aku's Robo Dojo and The Powerpuff Girls in Crystal Crisis, courtesy of Danish operator Visionik Intertactive.

An example of a bumper during the 2002–2005 Casillas Era. Each box shows a different video clip from the same or different cartoon. In each box, a character does an action, when they leave a box, they move to another box or their action is taken over by another character in another box.

Cartoon Network's second logo, used in various forms and styles from 11 April 2005 to 14 April 2013 (primarily from 11 April 2005 to 27 September 2010 and as production logo until 14 April 2013).

On 11 April 2005, after it was introduced in the United States, Cartoon Network adopted the CN City era until 23 May 2007.

=== 2010–2020 ===
A variation of the network's current logo which resembles its original logo, used as of 2011.

On 27 September 2010, the British version of Cartoon Network introduced its current branding and logo while Cartoon Network Too continued to use the Arrow era until 2012 and the 2004 logo was still used as the network's production logo until 14 April 2013. Designed by Brand New School, it makes heavy use of a black and white checkerboard motif, as well as various CMYK colour variations and patterns. This branding had been introduced earlier in the American version on 29 May 2010. The DOG was moved from the top right corner to the bottom right corner, like in the United States.

In August 2011, Turner Broadcasting System Europe EMEA announced that an HD simulcast of Cartoon Network would launch on 14 September. The launch would coincide with the channel's eighteenth birthday and the premiere of a new original series produced in the UK: The Amazing World of Gumball.

On 1 April 2014, Cartoon Network's DOG moved back to the top-right corner and a new Next banner using graphics from the Check It 3.0. branding package was introduced. Also during the same month, Cartoon Network Too closed down and was replaced by a reinstated one-hour timeshift service called Cartoon Network +1, which closed down on 5 March 2006. Cartoon Network's Check It 3.0 was fully implemented on Cartoon Network on 21 July 2014 for the official start of the school summer holidays in the UK, Ninjago: Masters of Spinjitzu also premiered on the channel on the same day. In November 2015, Cartoon Network launched their anti-bullying campaign in conjunction with Childline called Cartoon Network Buddy Network.

After nearly two years of the Laughternoons programming block was replaced by Mega Mondays on 14 April 2014, Laughternoons returned to Cartoon Network for a short period in January 2016. Mega Mondays was the name of Cartoon Network's new episodes programming block for three years before being discontinued in July 2017. It was replaced with New Fridays in March 2018.

In October 2015, Cartoon Network launched their own localised version of the Cartoon Network Anything app, featuring short-form content such as mini-games and video-clips. In February 2016, Cartoon Network used graphics from the Check It 4.0 branding package for the first time on a new episode promo for Transformers: Robots in Disguise. On 22 July 2016, Cartoon Network fully rebranded using graphics from the Check It 4.0 branding package. In April 2016, Cartoon Network signed a deal with Sky for exclusive on-demand boxset rights for a selection of its animated shows. In November 2016, Cartoon Network won two PromaxBDA UK awards for their Where's Ice King and Weetabix Weetabuddies television campaigns. On 21 July 2017, Cartoon Network fully rebranded using graphics from the Dimensional 1.0 branding package. In April 2019, Cartoon Network UK's website (as well as Boomerang UK's website) was hacked, with a Gumball video replaced with an Arabic meme video; this also happened with more hacking materials in other countries including Hungary, Romania, Germany, Russia, Poland, the Czech Republic, Denmark, Norway, the Netherlands, Italy, Turkey, Mexico, Brazil, Argentina, and the MENA region.

On 18 November 2020, WarnerMedia was granted a Czech (RRTV) broadcasting licence for Cartoon Network UK and Ireland, entitled Cartoon Network Eire, with the reason being to ensure continued legal carriage of Cartoon Network UK in the Republic of Ireland and Malta in accordance with the EU Audiovisual Media Services Directive (AVMSD) and single market law following the UK's withdrawal from the European Union. Like the UK, the Czech Republic has minimal broadcasting regulations and was chosen for EU licensing purposes as WarnerMedia's HBO had substantial operations located in the country. Editorially, the channel is still managed from Cartoon Network's offices at WarnerMedia's EMEA headquarters in London.

== Programming ==
=== Original scheduling ===
When Cartoon Network initially launched, its schedule was mainly made up of short cartoons from both Warner Bros. and other studios, such as Looney Tunes, Merrie Melodies and Tom and Jerry. A few years after, it started to broadcast its own programming such as The Powerpuff Girls and Dexter's Laboratory. Eventually, most of Cartoon Network's acquired programming was shifted to the sidelines, with the company's original animated series taking up the majority of Cartoon Network's timeslots.

=== Programming blocks ===
In September 2000, Toonami began broadcasting weekdays for two hours between 4 pm until 6 pm, and from 9 pm until 11 pm, as well as weekends from 10 am until noon and 10 pm until midnight. Dragon Ball Z had already been airing on Cartoon Network since March 2000, and had been attracting very good ratings, which may have contributed to the decision to launch Toonami in the UK. Its output consisted almost solely of Japanese anime such as the cult Dragonball Z, Tenchi Muyo!, and Gundam Wing. The only non-Japanese shows for quite some time were The Real Adventures of Jonny Quest and Batman Beyond. As time went on, Toonami started to shift away from Japanese anime and action programming, eventually morphing into CN Too.

Around the same time, there was almost completely new programming on the channel, and so Boomerang began in a late night slot; it ultimately branched off into its own channel after the block was discontinued.

From February 2012 until July 2017, Cartoon Network shifted its major night of premieres to Monday evenings, under the names "Meaty Mondays", and as of April 2014 "Mega Mondays". Additionally, the block's name would change to "Mince Pie Mondays" every December, sporting a more festive look and airing Christmas specials to boot. In May 2014, a much smaller Friday variety block, titled "Funsize Fridays" was launched. This block only ran for around 2014, and consisted of playing "a different show every fifteen minutes". The shows featured in the block were Adventure Time, The Amazing World of Gumball, Clarence, Johnny Test, Regular Show, Steven Universe, Teen Titans Go!, and Uncle Grandpa. Only one of these shows would air new episodes in this block, passing the baton to a different show monthly.

Eventually, both of these blocks were discontinued, and Cartoon Network was completely devoid of programming blocks for some time. However, in March 2018, a brand new Friday night premiere block launched, under the simple name "New Fridays". The block aired on Friday nights from 4pm to 9pm, and it was based upon the United States feed's "NEW NEW NEW NEW" block, carrying the same neon light branding from its international counterpart. Despite only lasting around four months, the block had a large variety of shows rotating in and out of premiere slots, including Adventure Time, The Amazing World of Gumball, Ben 10, Clarence, Cloudy with a Chance of Meatballs, Mighty Magiswords, Ninjago: Masters of Spinjitzu, OK K.O.! Let's Be Heroes, The Powerpuff Girls, Regular Show, Steven Universe, Supernoobs, Teen Titans Go!, We Bare Bears, Uncle Grandpa, and Unikitty!. The Canadian import Wishfart also had its premiere and new episodes restricted to the block. In July 2018, the block was discontinued unexpectedly.

==== Cartoonito ====
On 1 March 2022, a Cartoonito block was launched, airing on weekdays from 9 am to 10 am (although it briefly extended to end at 11 am during the Spring-Summer of 2022). Unlike the channel's other programming blocks, it does not air during the school holidays. The block ended on 30th January 2026.

== Sister networks ==
=== Boomerang ===
Logo of Boomerang

In May 2000, Boomerang was launched by Cartoon Network in the UK and Ireland, and most "classic" cartoons were moved from Cartoon Network to Boomerang, which initially broadcast from 6 am to 12 am. In October 2001, Boomerang became a 24-hour channel and the remaining "classic" cartoons like The Smurfs, also moved to Boomerang.

=== Cartoonito ===
Logo of Cartoonito

In May 2007, Cartoonito was launched as a pre-school channel replacing Cartoon Network Too. Cartoonito aired from 4am to 9pm daily. In January 2018, Cartoonito officially began airing 24 hours a day.

== Defunct sister networks ==
=== CNX ===
CNX was a channel operated by Turner Broadcasting System Europe in the UK and Ireland between 2002 and 2003. It was aimed at a male audience, with daytime programming aimed at older children and teenagers, and evening programming aimed at older teenagers and young adults. CNX was carried in the 'Entertainment' section of the Sky programme guide, and was also available on cable

=== Toonami ===
Toonami launched in September 2003 showing action programming. Toonami had originally replaced CNX, which launched in October 2002. In May 2007, Toonami was replaced by Cartoon Network Too which was later shut down.

=== Cartoon Network Too ===
In April 2006, Cartoon Network Too was launched on Sky on the same day as sister TCM 2 and Nick Jr. 2, broadcasting cartoons primarily made by Hanna-Barbera such as Dexter's Laboratory, The Powerpuff Girls, Johnny Bravo and Wacky Races. Cartoon Network Too aired from 3 am to 7 pm every day until May 2007, when it became a 24-hour channel, taking Toonami's slot and getting a new identity. In April 2014, Cartoon Network Too was replaced by a relaunched version of Cartoon Network +1.

== Related services ==
=== Cartoon Network +1 ===
Logo of Cartoon Network +1

In December 1998, Cartoon Network 2 launched on Sky Digital alongside the addition of the original network. It was the first one-hour timeshift service for a children's network in the United Kingdom. In March 1999, it was renamed to Cartoon Network Plus and later simply Cartoon Network +.

On 24 February 2006, Turner announced that the channel would cease operations on 6 March and would be replaced with the previously-announced Boomerang +1. On Sky, its EPG slot would swap spaces with Toonami.

Cartoon Network +1 was relaunched on 1 April 2014, replacing Cartoon Network Too. In July 2018, Cartoon Network +1 was temporarily replaced by a thematic pop-up channel that aired episodes of Ben 10.

=== Cartoon Network HD ===
Logo of Cartoon Network HD

In September 2011, Cartoon Network HD launched on Sky. In January 2013, Cartoon Network HD launched on Virgin Media's cable TV platform.

=== Website ===
Cartoon Network UK had a website which launched in 1998 until it sunsetted in May 2025, with the domain pointing to Cartoon Network's channel on YouTube.

== Virgin On Demand service ==
In April 2007, Cartoon Network launched onto Virgin Media's On Demand system, thus allowing Virgin Media customers to watch Cartoon Network programmes whenever they like. They can also take advantage of pause, rewind and fast forward functions, when watching these programmes.

== Hanna-Barbera Studios Europe ==
Hanna-Barbera Studios Europe (formerly Cartoon Network Studios Europe, Great Malbrough Productions, Inc. & Cartoon Network Development Studio Europe) is based in Shoreditch, London, located three miles away from Turner EMEA's headquarters. The studio was named after Great Marlborough Street where Turner Europe, Middle East and Africa's headquarters is located. The studio is the European equivalent to Cartoon Network Studios based in Burbank, California, USA. The studio was founded in 2007 and in 2011 it produced its first show, The Amazing World of Gumball, created by Ben Bocquelet. Cartoon Network Europe has also been involved in other co-productions in the past such as The Cramp Twins, Fat Dog Mendoza, Robotboy, Scooby-Doo! Mystery Incorporated, Elfy Food, The Happos Family, Hero 108, Spaced Out, VBirds, Cult Toons, Taffy, Best Ed, Chop Socky Chooks, Skatoony and The Heroic Quest of the Valiant Prince Ivandoe. The studio has also produced animation for the Malaria No More organisation. Originally, the studio's main focus was to produce animated shorts that could potentially become animated shows, this changed when production of The Amazing World of Gumball moved from Boulder Media and Dandelion Studios and went in-house with Studio Soi offering support. In September 2018, Cartoon Network Studios Europe's London-based studio began production on a new animated show, Elliott from Earth. The show premiered in 2021.

== Animated shorts ==
The studio has also produced animated shorts. Animated shorts produced by the studio include The Furry Pals, Mutant Moments, Hamshanks and the Himalolly Railway, Elliot's Zoo, Pinky Malinky and Verne on Vacation. The shorts were showcased in a similar way to Cartoonstitute by the American version of Cartoon Network. The videos were available to watch on the Cartoon Network Development Studio Europe YouTube channel which has since closed.

== See also ==
- Cartoon Network Too
- Boomerang (UK & Ireland)
- Cartoonito (UK & Ireland)
- Cartoonito (brand)
- CNX
- Toonami (UK & Ireland)
- Turner Broadcasting System Europe
