= AKA Cartoon Network =

- Also known as: Cult Toons
- Created by: Exceeda
- Directed by: Xavier Perkins; Brett Foraker
- Country of origin: United Kingdom
- No. of seasons: Approx 1–2

Production
- Running time: 25 min approx.

Original release
- Network: Cartoon Network
- Release: 1 February 1999 – 2000

AKA Cartoon Network was a slot in the Cartoon Network weekday evening schedule from 1999 to 2000, between 7 and 9 pm on weekday evenings. The slot consisted of repeated shows such as Space Ghost Coast to Coast, Tom and Jerry, Looney Tunes and Cow and Chicken. In addition, the slot included an original show called Cult Toons, broadcast only on Friday evenings.

'AKA' Stings and Cult Toons material consisted of Hanna-Barbera owned footage, prominently from the 1960s and 1970s (such as Wacky Races, The Perils of Penelope Pitstop, The Banana Splits (including Arabian Knights and Danger Island), Hong Kong Phooey, Help!... It's the Hair Bear Bunch!, Harlem Globetrotters). More contemporary material included Cow and Chicken and Dexter's Laboratory.

== Cult Toons ==
Cult Toons (also referred to by Exceeda as 'AKA Cult Toons') was a series of 30-minute slot experimental alternate comedy VJ (video jockey) videos, directed by Xavier Perkins and Brett Foraker. The inclusion of seemingly irrelevant and obscure clips from films and cartoons gave the show a very surreal and non sequitur quality.

For example, common features of the re-edited cartoons would include repeated footage (when a character would say "You can say that again" the previous line would often be repeated), freezing the footage (usually after a line such as "Hold everything!" or "Stop!"), overdubbing voices (including randomly replacing lines with the theme music to The Godzilla Power Hour), and repeating a line or sound effect and adding drum beats and record scratches over it, turning it into a brief hip-hop song.

The start of an episode of The Gary Coleman Show would often feature halfway through the show, edited so that lead character Andy LeBeau would suddenly explode a few seconds in. It would then end abruptly over a 'Technical Difficulties' caption, with a dramatic music sting.

Another example, suddenly cutting to a clip of a martial arts film if a character got angry. In addition, in an episode featuring the Super Furry Animals, the opening titles of Help!... It's the Hair Bear Bunch! were edited so that all mentions of "bears" were replaced with themselves saying "furry animals".

Prominent material however would be live-action films ranging from blaxploitation to Bruce Lee, as well as footage of celebrity interviews and turntable DJs created especially for the show.

The show would also feature clips from interviews with a range of special guests and promoted talents, particularly in the second series. Some special guests on the show included Rio Ferdinand, Super Furry Animals, Cast, Kele Le Roc, London Towers, Keith Duffy, Catatonia, Gay Dad, 21st Century Girls, Rick Witter, Courduroy, WCW Nitro Girls, Regular Fries, The Jungle Brothers, Trev Sinclair, Reef, Zach Shaw, A and Waikiki.

Tom Guest worked extensively on the show as a music producer. He later worked on a variety of products, including Cartoon Network and Nickelodeon commercials and idents in the early 2000s, a number of The Simpsons promotions for Channel 4, and background music for Pro Pinball:Big Race USA and MTV Base.

At the start of each episode, the featured cartoon and special guest would be announced by a Dexter-esque character named "MC Jackie Potato" (or Jackie P. for short), who was depicted by an edited likeness of Dexter from Dexter's Laboratory, made to appear with a dark skintone, a yellow outfit, and an afro haircut. The end credits of each episode would reveal the programme's UK origin by sampling a clip of Velma Dinkley from an episode of Scooby-Doo, Where Are You! saying "Made only in England!", interrupted after each word by record scratches and clips.
