= TCM Movies =

Defunct British TV channel

- Broadcast area: United Kingdom, Ireland, Malta and Gibraltar
- Headquarters: Turner House, Great Marlborough Street, London, United Kingdom

Programming
- Picture format: 16:9 576i SDTV
- Timeshift service: TCM Movies +1 (2013–2023)

Ownership
- Owner: Warner Bros. Discovery International
- Sister channels: Boomerang; Cartoon Network; Cartoonito; CNN International

History
- Launched: 17 September 1993; 33 years ago (as TNT); 15 October 1999; 27 years ago (as Turner Classic Movies/TCM Movies)
- Closed: 1 July 2000; 26 years ago (as TNT); 7 July 2023; 3 years ago (as Turner Classic Movies/TCM Movies)
- Replaced by: Sky Documentaries
- Former names: TNT (1993–1999); Turner Classic Movies (1999–2019)

Links
- Website: www.tcmuk.tv

TCM Movies (formerly TNT and Turner Classic Movies) was a British pay television channel, focusing mostly on classic movies, from the Turner Entertainment and Warner Bros. film libraries, which includes many MGM titles, along with movie-related profiles and some classic American television series.

== History ==
=== TNT Classic Movies (1993-1999) ===
TNT logo

In March 1993, Turner Broadcasting System Europe announced the launch of Cartoon Network and TNT Classic Movies. and it launched on 17 September 1993 through the Astra 1C satellite as an evening service, airing from 7:00pm–5:00am, timesharing with Cartoon Network Europe. The network was also available with Cartoon Network Europe in CEE, MENA and Nordic territories in five additional languages. The network broadcast movies from the Turner Entertainment library, including the pre-1986 MGM and pre-1949 Warner Bros. catalogues. The first film to be shown on the channel was the 1966 film Spinout starring Elvis Presley.

In 1996, the combined channel slot was available in over 31 million homes in over 33 territories. In August, the channel's broadcast hours were slightly reduced to start at 9:00pm, while in December a standalone 24-hour TNT Classic Movies channel was launched for digital cable providers in addition to the standalone Cartoon Network Europe channel. In the UK, this version of the network was first made available via CableTel beginning in 1997.

=== Relaunch as General Entertainment network (1999-2000) ===
On October 15, 1999, Cartoon Network Europe separated its feed to focus only on the United Kingdom and Ireland markets. It became a paid network encrypted on Astra 1C using VideoCrypt. This separation was made to allow Turner Classic Movies to replace TNT in all territories except for analogue satellite and cable in the UK and Ireland, where a standalone TNT channel replaced it.

The new version of TNT focused on general entertainment, with Fridays featuring a dedicated strand of WCW content, showcasing new episodes of WCW Monday Nitro (which TNT had been airing since 1996) and WCW Thunder. The new version of TNT broadcast daily from 9:00pm–1:00am.

In April 2000, Turner announced that TNT would cease operations on 30 June. The company cited an "oversaturated market" as the reason for its closure. On 1 July, Turner Classic Movies took over its former space on analogue satellite and some cable providers, and removed entirely on those that already broadcast Turner Classic Movies.

=== Turner Classic Movies (1999-2023) ===
On 15 October 1999, Turner Classic Movies launched on Sky Digital and NTL cable platforms. The first film to broadcast on the network was the 1946 movie The Big Sleep. While Cartoon Network had already transitioned into a pay network, Turner Classic Movies remained free-to-air. However it didn't start broadcasting on analogue satellite until after TNT closed, and it continued to share with Cartoon Network, airing in the same four-hour evening slot that TNT has occupied.

For a time after TNT's closure, Turner Classic Movies continued TNT's weekly strand of WCW programming on Fridays under a separate feed. Afterwards, WCW programming moved to Bravo.

On 30 June 2001, Cartoon Network and Turner Classic Movies ceased operations on analogue satellite as part of Sky's analogue shutdown.

In January 2004, Turner Classic Movies became encrypted on Sky Digital.

In 2009, Turner Classic Movies received a graphical makeover and a new logo in an attempt to attract a younger audience. With the makeover several new films were added to the channel's catalogue. A high definition version of the channel launched on 4 September 2012, at the same time the standard definition version began broadcasting in 16:9 widescreen, whereas Turner Classic Movies 2 continued to be broadcast in 4:3.

A one-hour timeshift, Turner Classic Movies +1, launched on 13 August 2013, replacing Turner Classic Movies 2.

On 25 July 2019, the HD channel closed on Sky.

Turner Classic Movies was renamed TCM Movies on 1 August 2019.

The channel closed on 7 July 2023, and some of the channel's former film programming was moved to sister channel Quest, this ended in January 2025. The last movie shown on the channel was Murder Most Foul and the last content shown on the channel before the closedown was a Close Up short dedicated to Arnold Schwarzenegger.

== Turner Classic Movies 2 ==
Turner Classic Movies 2 was a spin-off of the original channel and broadcast on Sky channel 318. The channel launched alongside Cartoon Network Too on 24 April 2006. It also showed popular films from the Turner Entertainment library (which includes MGM and Warner Bros. films).

Films were shown from 7:00PM to 3:00AM (later changed to 8:00PM to 4:00AM on 25 March 2010) (interspersed with various original short films about the films) from Monday-Sunday, and the following week included a new line-up. This allowed the viewer to "catch-up on the big films", thus allowing the chance to see the preferred film on any day of the week. The channel timeshared with Cartoonito (originally the original version of Cartoon Network Too from 24 April 2006 until 23 May 2007), another UK-only spin-off channel. The channel began airing Adult Swim at 10pm every Wednesday as of 4 January 2012, before moving to Friday later in April 2012.

=== Closure ===
For unknown reasons, Turner Classic Movies 2 closed at 4:00AM on 12 August 2013 with Turner Classic Movies +1 launching the next day, 13 August 2013.

== Other programming ==
=== Television series ===
- Band of Brothers
- Danger Man (Series 2–4 only)
- Deadwood
- Gunsmoke
- Wild Boys
- The Pillars of the Earth
- Kung Fu
- Rome
- The Thorn Birds
- Hell on Wheels
- Ed Sullivan's Rock n'Roll Classics
- The Best of the Ed Sullivan Show

rawhide 1959

=== Adult Swim ===
As Adult Swim shows cannot be shown on the UK version of Cartoon Network (as Ofcom regulated children's channels are not allowed to broadcast adult content), they were shown on Turner Classic Movies 2 instead. They typically started at 1:15 AM on Saturday and included shows such as:

- Aqua Teen Hunger Force
- Robot Chicken
- Metalocalypse
- The Venture Bros.
- Tim and Eric Awesome Show, Great Job!
- Squidbillies

=== Wrestling ===
World Championship Wrestling launched on TNT (UK) in April 1996 with WCW Monday Nitro. On 9 October 1998 WCW Thunder was added. Both aired in a 9pm to 12.30am (variant) block starting with the debut of Thunder. When TNT (UK) was closed down, WCW programming was briefly moved over to Turner Classic Movies and then Bravo. Trailers aired on Turner Classic Movies informing viewers of the change.

WCW Nitro

- 1996 to 1997 - Friday Nights - 9pm - 10pm
- 1997 to 1998 - Friday Nights - 9pm - 11pm
- 1998 to 2000 - Friday Nights - 9pm - 11.35pm
- 2000 - Friday Nights - 9pm - 11pm

(WCW Nitro then changed to Bravo in 2000, on Thursday Nights - 9pm - 11pm, until March 2001, when WCW was purchased by the World Wrestling Federation).

WCW Thunder

- 9 October 1998 to 2000 - Friday Nights - 11.35pm - 1am

== See also ==
- Turner Classic Movies
