= Boomerang (British and Irish TV channel) =

British television channel

- Country: United Kingdom
- Broadcast area: United Kingdom; Ireland; Malta
- Network: Cartoon Network
- Headquarters: London, England

Programming
- Language: English
- Picture format: 1080i HDTV (downscaled to 576i for the SDTV feed)
- Timeshift service: Boomerang +1

Ownership
- Owner: Skydance Corporation
- Parent: Skydance UK
- Sister channels: Animal Planet; Cartoon Network; Cartoonito; CNN International; Discovery Channel; Discovery History; Discovery Science; Discovery Turbo; DMAX; Food Network; Investigation Discovery; Quest; Quest Red; Really; TLC; TNT Sports

History
- Launched: 27 May 2000; 26 years ago

Links
- Website: www.boomerangtv.co.uk (dead link, redirects to its YouTube channel)

Availability

Terrestrial
- See separate section

Boomerang is a British pay television channel which primarily broadcasts classic and modern animated series from Hanna-Barbera and Warner Bros. Animation. The channel launched on 27 May 2000, as an offshoot of Cartoon Network and localised variant of the original American network. It is run and owned by Skydance Corporation under its UK division.

== History ==
Boomerang UK began as a block on Cartoon Network in 1993. It launched as a separate channel on 27 May 2000, broadcasting from 6:00 AM until 12:00 AM on Sky Digital and other cable systems. At the time of its creation, Cartoon Network had a unique schedule. This led to the creation of the channel by Turner Broadcasting to allow them to broadcast classic cartoons from the Hanna-Barbera, MGM, and Warner Bros. archive programme library. This subsequently allowed its sister network (Cartoon Network) to free many of its classic programming from its schedule.

In May 2001, Boomerang became the second-highest-rated children's channel in the UK, beaten only by parent service Cartoon Network. In July of that year, the channel was added to cable operator Telewest, thus increasing its viewership. James Greville, head of Cartoon Network UK at the time, stated, "The channel launched barely a year ago and yet it's already beaten established kids' channels in terms of ratings and share". By November, the channel was available on NTL.

Boomerang increased its library of old cartoons in early 2003 by acquiring rights to other animated shows such as Danger Mouse, The Pink Panther Show and Garfield and Friends.

On 13 September 2004, Boomerang rebranded to a new branding package made in-house at Turner Broadcasting System Europe, which featured newly-made animation for over 30 cartoon characters from the Hanna-Barbera catalogue and Looney Tunes including Bugs Bunny, Scooby-Doo, Daffy Duck, Wile E. Coyote and the Road Runner. Turner also expanded the Boomerang brand including a website being launched in September 2004 and a magazine for Boomerang titled Toonerang being launched in late 2004.

On 10 November 2005, Turner announced that it would launch a one-hour timeshift service of Boomerang. The channel launched on 6 March 2006, replacing Cartoon Network +'s broadcast capacity, and swapping over with Toonami's EPG slot on Sky. The launch of the service was part of a plan to boost Turner's audience penetration.

Boomerang rebranded with the new international graphics package developed by UK-based graphic design agency Art&Graft on 16 February 2015. The channel switched to 16:9 widescreen on 1 June 2015. Subsequently, a high-definition feed was launched on 24 June 2015.

On 3 September 2018, Boomerang was rebranded once again.

On 18 November 2020, following the United Kingdom's withdrawal from the European Union, Boomerang and Cartoon Network were split into two regions after the broadcasting licence reserved for the Republic of Ireland and Malta was moved to the Czech Republic, in accordance with the EU Audiovisual Media Services Directive (AVMSD) and single market law following the UK's withdrawal from the European Union. Like the UK, the Czech Republic has minimal broadcasting regulations and was chosen for EU licensing purposes as WarnerMedia's HBO had substantial operations located in the country. Editorially, the channel is still managed from WarnerMedia's EMEA headquarters in London.

== Availability ==
=== Cable ===
- Virgin Media UK: Channel 730 (HD) and Channel 731 (+1)

=== Online ===
- Now TV: Watch live

=== Satellite ===
- Sky: Channel 603 (HD), Channel 611 (+1) and Channel 641 (SD)

=== Terrestrial ===
- BT UK: Channel 467 (SD) and Channel 474 (HD)

== Programming ==
=== Live-action programming ===
Between 23 July 2007 to 1 August 2009, the channel started airing live-action programming, starting with Fraggle Rock (which also began airing on Cartoonito the same day).

Other live-action series included Life with Derek (which formerly aired on Toonami after its closure, alongside Blue Water High), popular sitcom The Latest Buzz and the spy show My Spy Family.

== Logos ==
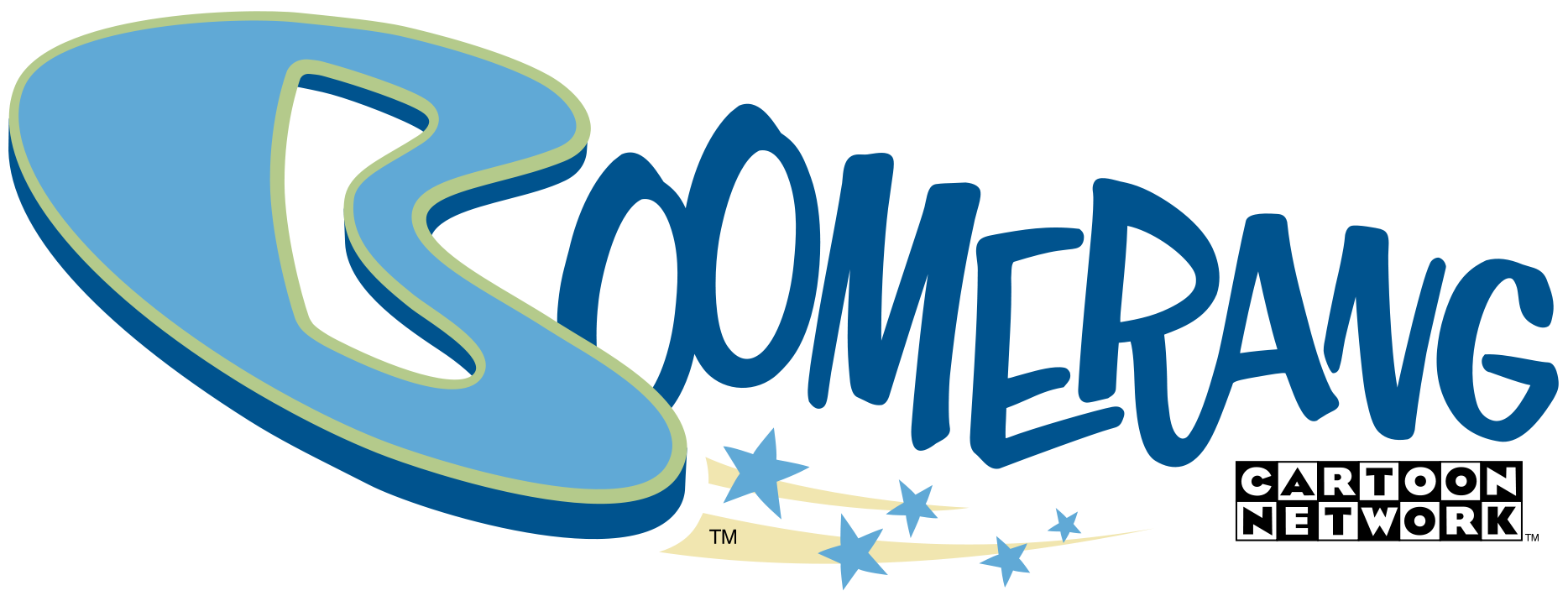
27 May 2000 – 13 September 2004

13 September 2004 – 16 February 2015
