= List of programs broadcast by Cartoon Network (Asia) =

This is a list of television programs currently rerunning and formerly on Cartoon Network Asia since it was launched on October 6, 1994.

== Current programming ==
=== Cartoon Network Originals ===
Cartoon Network Studios
Title	Premiere date	Current Season	Notes
Adventure Time	April 2011	Reruns	
Adventure Time: Side Quests	October 2026	1	
Ben 10 (2016)	1 October 2016	Reruns	
Clarence	5 January 2015	Reruns	
Courage the Cowardly Dog	Unknown	Reruns	
Regular Show	June 2012	Reruns	
Regular Show: The Lost Tapes	11 May 2026	1	
Steven Universe	6 January 2014	Reruns	
The Powerpuff Girls (2016)	9 April 2016	Reruns	
Uncle Grandpa	5 May 2014	Reruns	
We Baby Bears	8 January 2022	2	
We Bare Bears	16 November 2015	Reruns	
Hanna-Barbera Studios Europe
Beast Boy: The Lone Wolf	21 April 2025	1	
The Amazing World of Gumball	1 October 2011	Reruns	
The Wonderfully Weird World of Gumball	6 October 2025	1	
Warner Bros. Animation
Batwheels	16 October 2022	1	(Note: Also a Cartoonito original program.)
Bugs Bunny Builders	December 2022	1	
Looney Tunes Cartoons	7 May 2021	Reruns	
My Adventures with Superman	7 December 2024	1	
Teen Titans Go!	6 January 2014	9	
The Tom and Jerry Show	7 April 2014	Reruns	
Unikitty!	2018	Reruns	
Cartoon Network International
Lamput	13 April 2017	4	
Tom and Jerry (2023)	21 October 2023	1	

=== Acquired programming ===
- 50/50 Heroes
- Exchange Student Zero
- Grizzy & the Lemmings
- Hero Inside
- Karate Sheep
- Lego Dreamzzz
- Mechamato
- Maca & Roni
- Mini Beat Power Rockers
- Mr. Bean: The Animated Series
- Ninjago: Dragons Rising
- Super Shiro
- Tobot: Daedo's Heroes (exclusive to Cartoon Network Philippines)
- Totally Spies!

== Former programming ==
=== Original programming from Cartoon Network Studios ===
- Apple & Onion (25 January 2019 – 1 July 2022; 2 January 2025 – 1 April 2025)
- Ben 10 (2005)
- Ben 10: Alien Force
- Ben 10: Omniverse
- Ben 10: Ultimate Alien
- Camp Lazlo
- Chowder (6 April 2009 – 2025)
- Class of 3000
- Codename: Kids Next Door
- Cow and Chicken
- Craig of the Creek (25 August 2018 - 1 January 2025)
- Dexter's Laboratory
- Ed, Edd n Eddy
- Foster's Home for Imaginary Friends
- Generator Rex
- Grim & Evil
- Hi Hi Puffy AmiYumi
- I Am Weasel
- Johnny Bravo
- Mao Mao: Heroes of Pure Heart (14 December 2019 – August 2021)
- Megas XLR
- Mighty Magiswords (13 March 2017 – 1 January 2022)
- Mike, Lu & Og
- Mixels
- My Gym Partner's a Monkey
- OK K.O.! Let's Be Heroes (20 January 2018 – 1 January 2022)
- Over the Garden Wall
- Samurai Jack
- Sheep in the Big City
- Steven Universe Future (2020–2021)
- Squirrel Boy
- Summer Camp Island (25 January 2019 - 31 December 2024)
- The Fungies! (14 November 2020 – 2022)
- The Grim Adventures of Billy & Mandy
- The Life and Times of Juniper Lee
- The Marvelous Misadventures of Flapjack
- The Powerpuff Girls (1998)
- Time Squad
- Victor and Valentino (25 August 2019 – 14 September 2022)
- What a Cartoon!

=== Original programming from Hanna-Barbera Studios Europe ===
- Elliott from Earth (2021)
- The Heroic Quest of the Valiant Prince Ivandoe (4 February 2023 - 2024)

=== Original programming from Cartoon Network International ===
- Ekans – Snakes Awake (2022)

=== Original programming from Hanna-Barbera ===
- 2 Stupid Dogs
- The 13 Ghosts of Scooby-Doo
- The Addams Family
- The All New Popeye Show
- Cattanooga Cats
- The Fantastic Four
- Fantastic Max
- Fish Police
- The Flintstone Kids
- The Flintstones
- Godzilla
- Hong Kong Phooey
- Jabberjaw
- The Jetsons
- Jonny Quest
- Josie & the Pussycats
- Monchhichis
- The New Scooby-Doo Movies
- The New Scooby-Doo Mysteries
- The New Shmoo
- Paddington Bear
- The Perils of Penelope Pitstop
- The Pirates of Dark Water
- A Pup Named Scooby-Doo
- Richie Rich
- Scooby-Doo and Scrappy-Doo (1979)
- Scooby-Doo and Scrappy-Doo (1980)
- Scooby-Doo, Where Are You?
- Snooper and Blabber
- Speed Buggy
- Squiddly Diddly
- SWAT Kats
- ThunderCats
- Tom and Jerry
- Tom & Jerry Kids
- The Tom & Jerry Show (1975)
- Top Cat
- Wally Gator
- Yogi's Treasure Hunt

=== Original programming from Warner Bros. Animation ===
- Baby Looney Tunes
- The Batman
- Batman: The Brave and the Bold
- Be Cool, Scooby-Doo!
- DC Super Hero Girls (16 November 2019 – 28 October 2022)
- Duck Dodgers
- Harry Potter: Hogwarts Tournament of Houses (2022)
- Jellystone!
- Justice League
- Justice League Action
- Justice League Unlimited
- Krypto the Superdog
- Looney Tunes
- ¡Mucha Lucha!
- New Looney Tunes
- Ozzy & Drix
- The Road Runner Show
- Scooby-Doo and Guess Who?
- Scooby-Doo! Mystery Incorporated
- Static Shock
- Superman: The Animated Series
- The Sylvester & Tweety Mysteries
- Teen Titans
- ThunderCats Roar (2020–2021)
- Tiny Toons Looniversity
- Tom and Jerry Tales
- Tom and Jerry in New York (6 December 2021 – 2024)
- What's New, Scooby-Doo?
- Xiaolin Showdown
- The Zeta Project

=== Original programming from Adult Swim (Philippines only) ===
- Aqua Teen Hunger Force
- The Brak Show
- Harvey Birdman, Attorney at Law
- Sealab 2021
- Space Ghost Coast-to-Coast

=== Acquired programming ===
- ABC Monsters
- The Adventures of Hello Kitty & Friends (exclusive to Cartoon Network Philippines)
- The Adventures of Tintin (exclusive to Cartoon Network Philippines)
- Ani-Yoko (exclusive to Cartoon Network Philippines)
- Animal Control!
- Atomic Betty
- Barbie Dreamhouse Adventures
- Beat Monsters
- Beyblade (exclusive to Cartoon Network Philippines)
- Big Bag
- Bill & Tony
- Bola Kampung (except Cartoon Network Philippines)
- Boy Girl Dog Cat Mouse Cheese
- Buck & Buddy (shorts)
- Captain Planet and the Planeteers
- Casper & The Angels
- Centurions
- Cha-Ching
- Chop Socky Chooks
- Coconut Fred's Fruit Salad Island
- Code Lyoko
- Chaplin & Co
- Crash B-Daman (exclusive to Cartoon Network Philippines)
- Crocadoo
- Crush Gear Turbo (exclusive to Cartoon Network Philippines)
- Cloudy with a Chance of Meatballs
- Desdemona
- Detective Squad
- Dink the Little Dinosaur
- Dragon Ball Z Kai
- DreamWorks Dragons
- The Dukes of Broxstonia
- Fish N Chips
- Future Card Buddyfight Ace (exclusive to Cartoon Network Philippines)
- The Garfield Show
- Genki Bakuhatsu Ganbaruger (exclusive to Cartoon Network Philippines)
- The Gransazers (exclusive to Cartoon Network Philippines)
- Gundam Build Fighters (exclusive to Cartoon Network Philippines)
- Gundam Build Fighters Try (exclusive to Cartoon Network Philippines)
- Journey of Long (moved to Boomerang)
- He-Man and the Masters of the Universe
- Horrid Henry
- Hot Wheels Battle Force 5 (exclusive to Cartoon Network Philippines)
- Jewelpet (exclusive to Cartoon Network Philippines)
- Jimmy Two-Shoes
- Johnny Test
- Journey of Long
- The Jungle Bunch (exclusive to Cartoon Network Philippines)
- The Justirisers (exclusive to Cartoon Network Philippines)
- Kingdom Force (moved to Boomerang)
- Lego Monkie Kid
- The Little Lulu Show
- Machine Robo Rescue (exclusive to Cartoon Network Philippines)
- The Mask
- Medabots (exclusive to Cartoon Network Philippines)
- Mermicorno: Starfall
- Mighty Mike
- Mission Hill (exclusive to Cartoon Network Philippines)
- Monster Beach (2020–2021) (moved to Boomerang)
- Mr. Magoo
- The Mr. Men Show
- Mega Bites
- Mirmo! (exclusive to Cartoon Network Philippines)
- Mojacko
- My Little Pony: Friendship Is Magic
- My Little Pony: Pony Life
- My Melody (exclusive to Cartoon Network Philippines)
- Naruto
- Ninja Express (moved to Boomerang)
- Ninjago
- Oggy and the Cockroaches (late 2011 - August 31, 2021)
- Pet Alien
- Popeye Cartoons
- The Popeye Show
- Power Players (2020–2021)
- Pink Panther and Pals
- Pokémon (moved to Disney Channel Asia)
- Powerpuff Girls Z
- Princess Sara
- Rat-A-Tat
- Robotboy
- Rocket Jo
- Rocky and Bullwinkle
- Running Man Animation
- Ryukendo (exclusive to Cartoon Network Philippines)
- Sazer X (exclusive to Cartoon Network Philippines)
- Shaun the Sheep
- The Simpsons (exclusive to Cartoon Network Philippines)
- Small World
- The Smurfs
- Snack World
- Sonic Boom
- Speed Racer (exclusive to Cartoon Network Philippines)
- Stars Align
- Sugar Sugar Rune (exclusive to Cartoon Network Philippines)
- Supernoobs
- Talking Tom Heroes (moved to Boomerang)
- Thomas & Friends (exclusive to Cartoon Network Philippines)
- Time Bokan 24
- Time Warp Trio
- Timeless Tales
- Tomica Hero: Rescue Fire (exclusive to Cartoon Network Philippines)
- Total Drama
- Total DramaRama
- Transformers: Cyberverse
- True and the Rainbow Kingdom (exclusive to Cartoon Network Philippines)
- The Wacky World of Tex Avery
- Wallace & Gromit's Cracking Contraptions
- Where on Earth Is Carmen Sandiego?
- Winx Club (moved to Nickelodeon)
- The Woody Woodpecker Show (exclusive to Cartoon Network Philippines)
- X-Men: Evolution
- Xiaolin Chronicles
- Yo-Kai Watch
- Yu-Gi-Oh! Duel Monsters (exclusive to Cartoon Network Philippines)
- Zoids: Chaotic Century (exclusive to Cartoon Network Philippines)
- Zoids: Fuzors (exclusive to Cartoon Network Philippines)
- Zoids Genesis (exclusive to Cartoon Network Philippines)
- Zoids Wild (exclusive to Cartoon Network Philippines)

=== Cartoonito programming ===
- Baby Looney Tunes
- Batwheels
- Dino Ranch
- Lucas The Spider
- Monchhichi Tribe
- Mumfie
- Ranger Rob
