= List of programs broadcast by Cartoon Network (South Korea) =

The following is a list of current and former programming broadcast by the TV channel, Cartoon Network.

== Current programming ==
=== Original series ===
- The Amazing World of Gumball (October 17, 2011–present)
- We Bare Bears (November 21, 2015–present)
- The Powerpuff Girls (2016) (April 9, 2016–present)
- Ben 10 (2016) (October 1, 2016–present)
- Apple & Onion (2018–present)
- Craig of the Creek (December 1, 2018–present)
- Jellystone!
- Summer Camp Island (July 18, 2019–present)
- Victor and Valentino (September 5, 2019–present)
- Mao Mao: Heroes of Pure Heart (March 10, 2020–present)
- Teen Titans Go! (November 1, 2014–present)
- ThunderCats Roar
- Tom and Jerry in New York
- Unikitty! (May 5, 2018–present)
- Elliott from Earth
- Steven Universe Future
- We Baby Bears
- Regular Show: The Lost Tapes

=== Cartoonito programming ===
- Dino Ranch
- Lucas the Spider
- Monchhichi Tribe
- Mush-Mush and the Mushables

=== Acquired programming ===
- Pokémon (2008–present)
- Ninjago (June 15, 2012–present)
- Chi-Ling-Ching: Secret Juju (2012–present)
- Lego Friends (2014–present)
- Hello Carbot (September 15, 2014–present)
- Mysterious Joker (March 3, 2015–present)
- Beyblade Burst (July 12, 2016–present)
- Grizzy & the Lemmings (October 7, 2016–present), also airs on Cartoonito (South Korea).
- Sophie Ruby (October 30, 2016–present)
- SpongeBob SquarePants (July 7, 2025–present)
- Running Man Animation (August 11, 2017–present)
- Dino Mecard (February 19, 2018–present)
- My Friend, Corey (August 20, 2018–present)
- Tobot V (April 2, 2019–present)
- Sgt. Frog (June 7, 2019–present)
- Mighty Mike (July 4, 2019–present)
- Go! Animal Rescue (July 6, 2019–present)
- Bugsbot Ignition (July 25, 2019–present)
- Butt Detective (August 12, 2019–present)
- Bakugan: Battle Planet (August 22, 2019–present)
- Lego City Adventures (August 24, 2019–present)
- DC Super Hero Girls
- Journey of Long
- Lilo & Stitch
- Titoo

=== Reruns ===
- Adventure Time (April 8, 2011–present)
- Ben 10: Omniverse (November 2, 2012–present)
- Ben 10: Ultimate Alien (October 10, 2010–present)
- Common Siblings (May 9, 2019–present)
- Turning Mecard (January 10, 2017–present)

== Former programming ==
=== Original series ===
- Courage the Cowardly Dog (November 2006 – 2008)
- Dexter's Laboratory (November 2006 – 2008)
- Codename: Kids Next Door (November 2006 – 2008)
- The Powerpuff Girls (November 2006 – 2008)
- Ben 10 (December 9, 2006 – 2008)
- My Gym Partner's a Monkey (December 9, 2006 – 2009)
- Robotboy (March 19, 2007 – 2008)
- Foster's Home for Imaginary Friends (April 2007 – 2010)
- Powerpuff Girls Z (2007–2008)
- Camp Lazlo (July 16, 2007 – 2009)
- The Grim Adventures of Billy & Mandy (2008 – 2010)
- Squirrel Boy (2008 – 2009)
- Transformers: Animated (2008)
- Chowder (May 1, 2009 – 2011)
- Ben 10: Alien Force (July 20, 2009 – 2010)
- The Marvelous Misadventures of Flapjack (July 31, 2009 – 2011)
- Hero: 108 (2010–2012)
- Generator Rex (March 6, 2011 – 2013)
- Samurai Jack (2012)
- The Secret Saturdays (2012)
- Regular Show (March 4, 2013 – 2018)
- Johnny Bravo (September 9, 2013 – September 20, 2013)
- Ed, Edd n Eddy (December 13, 2013 – January 24, 2014)
- Mixels (2014–2016)
- Steven Universe (February 14, 2014 – 2019)
- Uncle Grandpa (March 31, 2014 – 2018)
- Clarence (February 6, 2015 – 2019)
- Exchange Student Zero (2016)
- Mighty Magiswords (February 13, 2017 – 2020)
- OK K.O.! Let's Be Heroes (January 1, 2018 – 2020)
- The Heroic Quest of the Valiant Prince Ivandoe (December 25, 2018)

=== Acquired programming ===
- Xiaolin Showdown (November 11, 2006 – October 20, 2013)
- Teen Titans (November 11, 2006 – 2010)
- Tom and Jerry (November 2006 – 2009)
- Postman Pat (November 13, 2006 – 2007)
- Petite Princess Yucie (December 2006 – 2007)
- Where on Earth Is Carmen Sandiego? (December 9, 2006 – 2008)
- Olympus Guardian (2007)
- Nalong 2 (2007)
- Bumper King Zapper (2007)
- Justice League (2007–2008)
- Justice League Unlimited (2007–2008)
- What's New, Scooby-Doo? (2007–2008)
- Mask Man (2007)
- Astro Boy (1980) (2007–2008)
- Pet Alien (2007)
- Artificial Insect Kabuto Borg VxV (2007)
- Z-Squad (June 4, 2007 – September 10, 2007)
- The Batman (July 23, 2007 – 2009)
- Pak Pak Pak Monta (2007)
- The Marshmallow Times (2007)
- Skunk Fu! (October 9, 2007 – 2008)
- Fantastic Four: World's Greatest Heroes (November 5, 2007 – 2008)
- Tai Chi Chasers (November 19, 2007 – 2008)
- Tom and Jerry Tales (November 23, 2007 – 2010)
- The New Woody Woodpecker Show (December 17, 2007 – 2008)
- Giga Tribe (2008–2009)
- Kamichama Karin (2008)
- Kirarin Revolution (Season 2) (September 1, 2008 – 2009)
- Ruby Gloom (2008)
- Wan Wan Celeb Soreyuke! Tetsunoshin (2008–2009)
- Storm Hawks (2008–2009)
- Batman: The Brave and the Bold (November 7, 2009 – 2011)
- Onegai My Melody (2009–2012)
- Futari wa Pretty Cure Splash Star (2009)
- Beyblade: Metal Fusion (2009–2011)
- Kid vs. Kat (2009 – 2012)
- Akazukin Chacha (March 2, 2010 – 2011)
- The Monster Kid (April 28, 2010 – 2011)
- Kiteretsu Daihyakka (May 10, 2010 – February 6, 2014)
- Mix Master: Final Force (July 26, 2010 – March 21, 2011)
- Scan2Go (November 15, 2010 – April 1, 2011)
- Ninja Hattori-kun (December 13, 2010 – October 19, 2012)
- Mighty Cat Masked Niyander (2010–2012 – May 6, 2013 – May 20, 2013)
- Tobot (2010 – December 14, 2015)
- The Super Hero Squad Show (2010–2012)
- Ultimate Muscle II (2010–2011)
- Bolts & Blip (January 19, 2011 – April 21, 2011)
- Little Battlers Experience (September 19, 2011 – May 15, 2014)
- Sidekick (2011–2012)
- Jewelpet (2011–2012)
- Jimmy Two-Shoes (2011–2012)
- Cardfight!! Vanguard (2011–2012)
- Tayo the Little Bus (January 21, 2012 – March 3, 2012)
- Cardcaptors (February 15, 2012 – October 16, 2012)
- Toriko (March 14, 2012 – August 25, 2014)
- The Beeps (2008–2010)
- Osomatsu-kun (July 25, 2012 – August 8, 2013)
- Robot Arpo (September 24, 2012 – November 13, 2012)
- The Looney Tunes Show (2012 – March 19, 2014)
- DreamWorks Dragons (January 3, 2013 – October 11, 2014)
- Kodocha (March 9, 2013 – 2014)
- Magi: The Labyrinth of Magic (April 8, 2013 – May 20, 2013)
- Legends of Chima (May 1, 2013 – February 5, 2015)
- Fish 'n Chips (May 6, 2013 – June 12, 2013)
- Pretty Rhythm: Aurora Dream (September 7, 2013 – March 15, 2014)
- ThunderCats (2011) (October 5, 2013 – January 25, 2014)
- Frankie and Friends (March 3, 2014 – April 10, 2014)
- Dooly the Little Dinosaur (2009) (May 12, 2014 – June 23, 2014)
- Gundam Build Fighters (July 30, 2014 – October 22, 2014)
- Tori Gogo (September 17, 2014 – October 2, 2014)
- Barbie: Life in the Dreamhouse (September 22, 2014 – 2014)
- Hero Bank (October 6, 2014 – December 27, 2015)
- Detective Story (November 24, 2014 – November 25, 2014 – 2015–2018)
- Gundam Build Fighters Try (March 27, 2015 – September 11, 2015)
- Inspector Gadget (2015) (June 2, 2015 – July 2, 2019) also airs on Boomerang (South Korea).
- Turbo Fast (September 10, 2015 – January 1, 2017)
- Iron Man (September 11, 2015 – September 16, 2015)
- Spookiz (September 17, 2015 – October 2, 2015)
- Robotex (2015–2016)
- Sonic Boom (October 12, 2015 – November 30, 2015) also airs on Boomerang (South Korea).
- Zombiedumb (January 11, 2016 – October 9, 2016)
- B-Daman Fireblast (January 18, 2016 – April 12, 2016)
- Nexo Knights (March 4, 2016 – September 24, 2017)
- Turning Mecard (March 15, 2016 – April 12, 2016)
- Athlon Tobot (April 1, 2016 – May 18, 2017)
- Mr. Bean: The Animated Series (April 4, 2016 – July 23, 2016) also airs on Boomerang (South Korea).
- Yu-Gi-Oh! Duel Monsters (May 12, 2016 – July 28, 2016)
- Be Cool, Scooby-Doo! (July 14, 2016 – February 24, 2017) also airs on Boomerang (South Korea).
- Mini Force (July 18, 2016 – December 9, 2016)
- Larva (July 18, 2016 – August 15, 2016)
- Power Battle Watch Car (September 10, 2016 – September 11, 2016)
- Kamiwaza Wanda (September 12, 2016 – May 21, 2017)
- PriPara (September 19, 2016 – November 11, 2016)
- My Little Pony: Friendship Is Magic (October 8, 2016 – January 1, 2017) moved to Tooniverse.
- Kamisama Minarai: Himitsu no Cocotama (November 5, 2016 – October 27, 2017)
- Total Drama (December 30, 2016 – December 31, 2016)
- Capsule Boy (February 5, 2017 – July 2, 2017)
- Geomeca (March 14, 2017 – February 21, 2018)
- Yu-Gi-Oh! Arc-V (April 10, 2017 – July 11, 2017)
- Horrid Henry (April 22, 2017 – April 30, 2017)
- Total Drama Presents: The Ridonculous Race (May 27, 2017 – May 28, 2017)
- Kong Soon Yi (June 3, 2017 – June 19, 2017)
- Justice League Action (June 11, 2017 – June 11, 2017)
- Dino Core (Season 3) (October 20, 2017 – January 12, 2018)
- Turning Mecard R (November 10, 2017 – May 4, 2018)
- The Sound of Heart (January 27, 2018 – February 18, 2018)
- Johnny Test (July 21, 2018 – March 2019)
- Snack World (July 21, 2018 – May 25, 2019)
- Lip Changer (October 6, 2018 – November 17, 2018)
- Gundam Build Divers (January 12, 2019 – April 6, 2019)
- Barbie Dreamhouse Adventures (March 9, 2019 – June 2, 2019)

== Upcoming programming ==
=== Original series ===
- Jessica's Big Little World

=== Acquired programming ===
- Boy Girl Dog Cat Mouse Cheese
- Jungle Box
- Lego Monkie Kid
- Maca & Roni
- Oddbods
- Pat the Dog
- Pucca: Love Recipe
