= Cartoon Network (Philippines) =

- Country: Singapore
- Broadcast area: Philippines

Programming
- Language: English
- Picture format: 1080i HDTV (High-definition simulcast of CN Southeast Asia); 480i SDTV (Philippine feed; usually upscaled for high-definition TV sets)

Ownership
- Owner: Skydance Corporation
- Sister channels: Cartoon Network Asia; Cartoonito Asia; HLN; CNN; CNN Philippines (closed); Warner TV

History
- Launched: October 6, 1994; 32 years ago (as part of Cartoon Network Asia); September 1, 1995; 31 years ago (Localized feed for Philippine television)

Links
- Website: CartoonNetworkAsia.com

Availability

Terrestrial
- Cignal TV Nationwide: Channel 74 (SD); Channel 220 (HD)
- SatLite Nationwide: Channel 82
- Sky Cable Metro Manila: Channel 43 (SD); Channel 178 (HD)

Cartoon Network is a Philippine pay television channel operated by Skydance Corporation under its International division, which primarily shows animated programming. The Philippine version is a branch of Cartoon Network Asia and broadcasts exclusively in the Philippines.

The channel started broadcasting on October 6, 1994, as part of Cartoon Network Asia. It was later separated from the Southeast Asia feed on September 1, 1995.

== History ==
=== 1994–1999: Launch and early years ===
Cartoon Network Philippines was formerly part of Cartoon Network Asia, which was originally launched on October 6, 1994. The Philippine feed started broadcasting on September 1, 1995, as it was originally time-shared with TNT Asia, operating from 6:00 a.m. to 9:00 p.m.; the TNT block changed into Turner Classic Movies and filling the remainder of the daily schedule. It originally aired only Hanna-Barbera cartoons such as The Yogi Bear Show, Top Cat, and The Flintstones. Cartoon Network is the first cartoon cable channel in the Philippines, with Nickelodeon, launched in 1998, and Disney Channel in 2000, following suit. In 1996, the channel started to air MGM cartoons, such as Tom and Jerry, Droopy, and Spike and Tyke. Following Time Warner's purchase of Turner later that year, the channel added Warner Bros. shows, such as Looney Tunes and related cartoons, to its programming in 1997. In 1998, Cartoon Network started to air its first original shows: Space Ghost Coast to Coast and The Moxy Show. The latter, however, was soon canceled.

=== 1999–2005: Powerhouse era ===
On August 22, 1999, Cartoon Network Asia began adopting Cartoon Network USA's "Powerhouse" theme. That year, the network introduced Dexter's Laboratory, Cow and Chicken, I Am Weasel, Ed, Edd n Eddy, and Johnny Bravo. New shows first aired the next year included The Powerpuff Girls, Mike, Lu & Og, and Courage the Cowardly Dog.

In 2001, Cartoon Network continued to air new original programs, such as Sheep in the Big City, Time Squad, and Samurai Jack. The network dubbed these original programs "Cartoon Cartoons" and aired them on a programming block Friday nights. The same year, Cartoon Network expanded to a 24-hour channel like in the parent Southeast Asia feed and created other programming blocks, including Toonami, Acme Hour, Prime Time, Boomerang, and Cartoon Network After Dark. In 2002, the network expanded Cartoon Cartoons with new shows such as Grim & Evil, Robot Jones, and Codename: Kids Next Door. Justice League and ¡Mucha Lucha! also debuted in 2002. Shows added to the line-up in 2003 include post-1948 Warner Bros. cartoons and X-Men: Evolution. In 2004, Foster's Home For Imaginary Friends was the only program to debut on the network. In 2005, the Boomerang programming block was made into its own channel.

=== 2005–2011: City/New Wave era ===
On October 1, 2005, the network bumpers were replaced with 3-D animations of the fictional "CN City", home to all the Cartoon Network characters. The network logo was also replaced. In 2006, several new Cartoon Network originals premiered, including Robotboy, The Life and Times of Juniper Lee, Camp Lazlo, Hi Hi Puffy AmiYumi, My Gym Partner's a Monkey, and Squirrel Boy. The Cartoon Cartoons moniker previously used for Cartoon Network originals was discontinued that year. Unusual for the network, The Simpsons, an adult-oriented cartoon, was also aired on Cartoon Network in 2006, albeit with a PG classification (with heavily use of editing and censorship, swears word has been cut out or muted).

On August 31, 2008, the network changed the format of its bumpers and commercials, mirroring similar changes by Cartoon Network Southeast Asia. During this time, older programs such as Foster's Home for Imaginary Friends and Camp Lazlo began to air less frequently, in favor of new shows such as Ben 10 and The Secret Saturdays. On December 5, 2008, Cartoon Network began to use the "New Wave" branding as with most Cartoon Network channels in Asia.

=== 2011–2014: "It's a Fun Thing!" era ===
On October 1, 2011, Cartoon Network introduced new branding and a logo. Designed by Brand New School, it makes heavy use of a black and white checkerboard motif. The slogan "It's a Fun Thing!" was also introduced. Many older advertisements and bumpers from the previous branding were retained, albeit with the addition of the new logo. A separate high-definition feed was also launched on the same day. In late 2011, Xilam's popular animated series Oggy and the Cockroaches was welcomed into its line-up and adored by the channel, and it still airs due to the said show being one of the network's top-viewed programs. In December 2012, Cartoon Network started aired past shows, such as Ben 10 and Camp Lazlo, in HDTV 1080i format instead of SDTV 480i format. Starting January 8, 2013, from 12:00 AM until 6:00 AM (PHT) each morning, Cartoon Network airs all shows and commercials in HDTV 1080i format.

=== 2014 – March 2019: "Are You CN What Where Sayin?/New New New New" era and current events ===
The slogan "It's a Fun Thing!", which has been nearly obsolete since 2013, was replaced by "Are You CN What Where Sayin'" in November 2014. On January 1, 2015, Cartoon Network adapted CHECK It 3.0, then CHECK it 4.0 on December 31, 2015, to January 1, 2016. However, the remaining bumpers were still aired when it was rebranded that time. In mid-late 2016, all of the CHECK it 1.0 bumpers were replaced with CHECK It 4.0.

On March 18, 2017, the channel rebranded itself to Dimensional starting with the airing of the miniseries, Adventure Time: Islands. As a result, some promos and bumpers (including the PG advisory) are now utilizing the current branding as used in the United States, while other bumpers retained the old branding.

=== April 2019 – 2022: Mashup/Dimensional 2.0 ===
On April 4, 2019, the "Are You CN Sayin?"/"New New New New" branding was replaced with Mashup. It introduced the "NEW in 5, 6, 7, and 8", a weeknight block featured freshest new episodes every top of the hour, starting at 5:00PM until 8:00PM, and "Best Summer Day" block for summer season. The said blocks and ident were used by their U.S. counterpart since 2018.

=== January 2022 – present: Redraw Your World ===
On January 8, 2022, Cartoon Network Asia, Korea, Hong Kong, and Taiwan rebranded to Redraw your World. The video series "Craft Your World" will launch on Cartoon Network Asia and Crayola websites and social channels in the coming weeks until the end of 2022. "Redraw Your World" physical events are also taking place from February onwards in malls across the region, including Singapore, Malaysia and the Philippines.

Cartoonito relaunched as a morning programming block on Cartoon Network Philippines, Asia and Korea on March 28, 2022. It offers a modern approach to preschool programming, built to support each child’s unique potential with its educational framework called “Humancentric Learning”.

On August 17, 2025, the network reconfigured to a 16:9 anamorphic widescreen standard-definition format, eliminating the use of letterboxing. The change allowed for a widescreen presentation, optimizing the viewing experience for viewers with compatible widescreen televisions. Although this change didn't yet affect all providers, but major providers (including Cignal) were affected by this change, confusing viewers that it actually switched to 16:9 until a few weeks later, where it finally affected all providers.

== Viewership statistics ==
In 2012, Cartoon Network became the number 1 kids channel in the Philippines.

In 2019, Cartoon Network and its sister channel Boomerang ranked first in Mega Manila and National Urban viewership as stated by the gathered data from Kantar Media Philippines.

== Cartoon Network on free-to-air television ==
=== Cartoon Network programs on GMA Network ===
GMA Network previously broadcast Cow and Chicken, Johnny Bravo, and The Powerpuff Girls in weekday mornings and afternoons in 2001. In 2008, few of the Cartoon Network programs like Camp Lazlo and My Gym Partner's a Monkey were shown on its sister network QTV (now GTV) until 2010, when TV5 acquired the rights of the entire Cartoon Network original programming. In 2019, GMA Network re-aired the original Ben 10 episodes every weekday mornings and Ben 10: Alien Force every weekends.

=== Block on TV5 ===
On October 18, 2010, TV5 launched TV5 Kids presents Cartoon Network, a cartoon block which airs selected Cartoon Network programs dubbed in Filipino.

The programs aired on the TV5 block included Ben 10, Ben 10: Alien Force, Ben 10: Omniverse, Codename: Kids Next Door, Courage the Cowardly Dog, Dexter's Laboratory, Ed, Edd n Eddy, Powerpuff Girls Z, The Secret Saturdays, and Teen Titans. In 2013, TV5 aired more Cartoon Network shows to their block like Regular Show, The Amazing World of Gumball and Adventure Time. On March 5, 2011, Generator Rex joins the weekend programming line-up of the network. In 2015, the block has been axed, giving way for the return of TV5 AniMEGA.

The block returned in October 2016, after a year of hiatus but with only two new CN shows (We Bare Bears and the 2016 reboot of The Powerpuff Girls) which airs only every Saturday and Sunday mornings and it does not air any of its older CN shows mentioned above unlike the original airing of the block.

When the network began airing NFL games in 2017 in the mornings, pre-empting the Cartoon Network and Boomerang block multiple times, the block was axed again in October 2017 as part of the network's shifting as a sports and news channel, led by their partnership with ESPN International, re-branding its sports arm to ESPN5 in the same month until March 8, 2020, when it was rebranded as One Sports.

From July 20, 2020 until June 2023, the block has returned as "Cartoon Network on TV5 Kids" every Monday and Wednesday as part of the broadcaster's programming shuffle.

=== Boomerang on TV5 Kids ===
Around late 2015, Boomerang on TV5 Kids was launched. It airs a few programs straight from Boomerang Southeast Asia and Boomerang Australia and New Zealand. All of the shows aired on the Boomerang block were dubbed in Filipino. As of 2017, TV5 AniMEGA is still airing.

Programs aired on the said block were The Looney Tunes Show, Rat-A-Tat, Inspector Gadget, The Powerpuff Girls and Mr. Bean: The Animated Series (now on Yey!) every weekday afternoons. On weekends, it airs We Bare Bears and the 2016 reboot of The Powerpuff Girls, despite it does not air on all feeds of Boomerang.

=== Block on CNN Philippines ===
On September 1, 2018, after a 1-year hiatus, Cartoon Network programs returned to free TV, this time over CNN Philippines. This is due to the growing trend of airing cartoons and entertainment shows on free-to-air news channels. Programs like We Bare Bears, Adventure Time, The Powerpuff Girls & Ben 10 are aired in its original language (English) instead of Filipino. The said shows are part of the newly launched CNN Philippines Junior weekend morning block, which also coincides with the launching of Newsroom Junior Edition.

== HD channel ==
The Philippine feed Cartoon Network does not have its own HD simulcast; instead, the high definition simulcast of Cartoon Network Asia is distributed in some major TV providers such as SkyCable HD, Cignal HD and Sky Direct, broadcasting at 1080i HDTV.

== Logos ==
The original Cartoon Network logo used from September 1, 1995, to September 30, 2005

The second Cartoon Network logo used from October 1, 2005, to October 1, 2011

The third and current Cartoon Network logo used since October 1, 2011

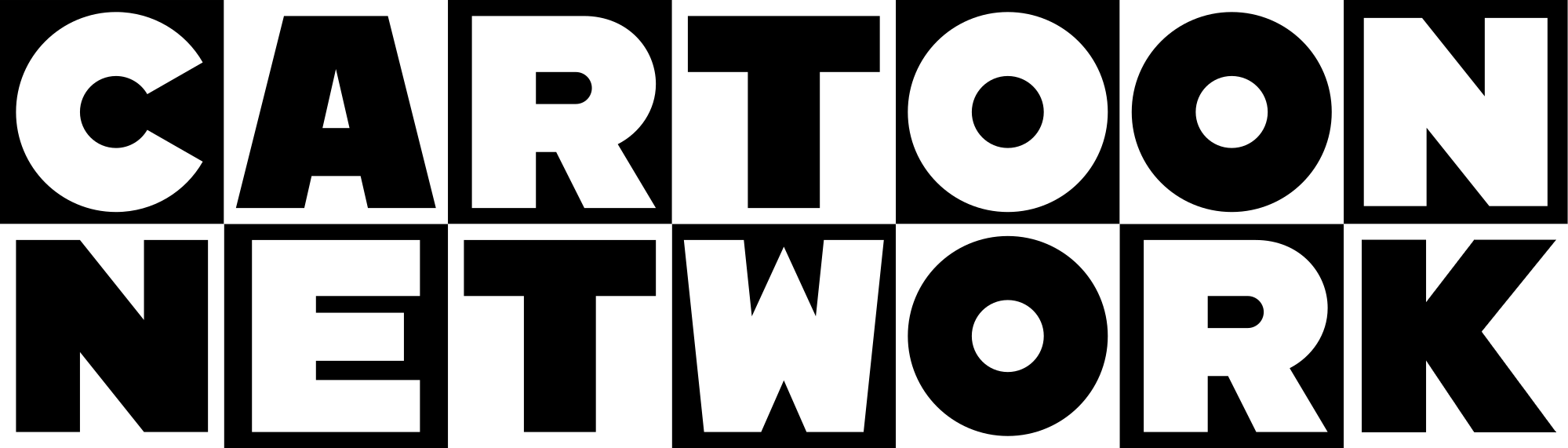
A variation of the original Cartoon Network logo from May 23, 2017, used in bumpers and sometimes a morphing logo screen bug (top-right)

== See also ==
- Adult Swim
- Boomerang
  - Australia
  - Southeast Asia
- Nickelodeon (Philippines)
- Toonami (Asia)
- truTV (Asia)
- Turner Classic Movies (Asia)
