= Cartoon Network (South Korea) =

South Korean pay TV channel

Cartoon Network (Korea) 카툰 네트워크
- Logo used since 2011
- Country: South Korea
- Broadcast area: Nationwide
- Headquarters: Seoul

Programming
- Languages: Korean; English
- Picture format: 1080i HDTV

Ownership
- Owner: Skydance Corporation (Skydance International Content and Distribution)
- Parent: Warner Bros. Discovery Korea Ltd.
- Sister channels: Discovery Channel; TLC

History
- Launched: 11 November 2006; 19 years ago

Cartoon Network Korea (Korean: 카툰 네트워크; RR: Katun Neteuwokeu) is a South Korean pay television channel which launched on 11 November 2006 and owned by Skydance Corporation under its International division. It is a based on South Korean version of the original United States television channel and primarily shows animated programming.

== History ==
=== 1995–2006: Background ===
In 1995, Orion Cartoon Network was launched. The channel's logo had nothing to do with Cartoon Network, instead using Orion's logo with the text 오리온카툰네트워크 next to it. The channel would later be renamed Tooniverse.

The rebranded channel aired a Cartoon Network block until December 2002, when they lost the contract. At the same time, CSTV started distributing the pan-Asian feed of the channel, but only in English, as Korean laws at the time imply that channels operating outside of South Korea are forbidden to carry Korean audio or subtitles within South Korean territory. Previously, Cartoon Network Japan was relayed on certain cable TV providers across South Korea. In April 2002, The Powerpuff Girls had a local release on terrestrial television, on the SBS network.

On 12 July 2006, Turner and JoongAng Media Network signed a deal to launch an official Korean version of Cartoon Network Asia.

=== 2006–2008: CN City era ===
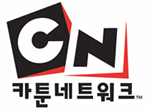
The former logo from 2006 until 2011.

On 11 November 2006, Cartoon Network Korea was launched, replacing the pan-Asian version on certain South Korean TV providers (but the process wasn't completed until 2011). At first, it used the "CN City" branding seen on many Cartoon Network channels worldwide with bumpers featuring well-known characters from Cartoon Network shows interacting in a CGI city composed of sets from them.

In 2006, several new series premiered, including Robotboy, The Life and Times of Juniper Lee, Camp Lazlo, Hi Hi Puffy AmiYumi, My Gym Partner's a Monkey and Squirrel Boy. The Cartoon Cartoons moniker previously used for the Cartoon Network originals was also dropped in 2006. The channel was also the first in Korea to air Ben 10, whose Korean theme song was sung by Bada. The channel carried four programming blocks at launch, the Korean version of Tiny TV (꼬마 TV), Nonstop Cartoon (논스톱 카툰), Pang Pang Fridays (팡팡 금요일), the Korean version of Fridays, dedicated to premiere episodes, and the movie block Cartoon Cinema (카툰 시네마). Local programming included the EBS series Poong Poong Ee, the 2005 KBS teen fantasy drama series Magic Warriors Mir & Gaon and local animated series Olympus Guardian, Bumper King Zapper and Nalong. Some anime series from Japan were also broadcast, with launch titles Princess Yucie, Makibaoh and Kimba the White Lion, as well as being the first channel outside of Japan to air Powerpuff Girls Z.

=== 2009–2011: New Wave era ===
In July 2009, Cartoon Network Korea's on-air style was changed, and two of its movie blocks (Cartoon Network Theatre and Fridays Flicks) merged into one umbrella branding (Cartoon Network Popcorn).

Like Cartoon Network Asia, the new branding featured a major visual theme in the form of dynamic lines, shown on the network's official website and in all station IDs. During the New Wave era, much of Cartoon Network's comedy programs (such as Foster's Home for Imaginary Friends and Camp Lazlo) began to be shown much less frequently in favor of more anime (such as Kiteretsu Daihyakka, Powerpuff Girls Z and Kaibutsu-kun) and action-oriented shows (such as Ben 10, Ben 10: Alien Force, and The Secret Saturdays).

=== 2011–2014: Exciting Fun era, Turner Broadcasting directly manage Cartoon Network Korea ===
On 26 December 2011, Cartoon Network Korea introduced the "CHECK it" branding and own slogan, 신나는 재미 (Exciting Fun). On 15 March 2012, the United States–Korea Free Trade Agreement went effective which allowed Turner Broadcasting to directly manage Cartoon Network Korea starting from March 2015. On November 14, local version of Boomerang Korea was launched in South Korea.

=== 2022–present: Redraw Your World era ===
On 8 January 2022, Cartoon Network Korea began using the "Redraw Your World" branding used in the United States, Hong Kong, Taiwan, and Southeast Asia. The new look of the channel features updated colors, music and design. Its new shows are designed to appeal to an even broader demographic.

==== Cartoonito ====
On 28 March 2022, the Cartoonito block was launched in South Korea, simultaneously with the launch in the Southeast Asian region.

== See also ==
- tvN
- Mnet
- Tooniverse
