= Toonami (Asia) =

Asian television channel

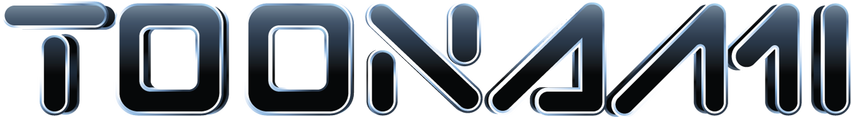
- Toonami's official logo in Asia
- Broadcast area: Southeast Asia

Programming
- Picture format: 16:9 (576i, SDTV); 16:9 (1080i, HDTV)

Ownership
- Owner: Turner Broadcasting System Asia Pacific, Inc. (Time Warner, Inc.)
- Sister channels: Cartoon Network; Boomerang

History
- Launched: 1 December 2012; 13 years ago
- Replaced: Boomerang (original version)
- Closed: 31 March 2018; 8 years ago

Links
- Website: www.toonamiasia.com

Toonami was an Asian television channel that was launched on 1 December 2012. It was operated and distributed in Asia by Turner Broadcasting System Asia Pacific, Inc., (now known as Warner Bros. Discovery Asia-Pacific) a subsidiary of Warner Bros. Discovery. It was named after the programming block seen in the U.S., using the logo introduced in 2004 but with different branded promos.

It was announced at Twitter (now X), The channel ceased operations on 31 March 2018, due to low ratings or other reason after which the channel space created in 2005 by the original version of Boomerang ceased to exist.

All Toonami programs have been moved from Cartoon Network, HBO Max & Netflix (Wakfu only).

After Cartoonito's relaunch in Asia, Toonami never returned, because Warner Bros. Discovery Asia-Pacific focuses on existing brands (like Cartoon Network, Cartoonito, Cinemax, HBO and others)

== Programming ==
- The Avengers: Earth's Mightiest Heroes
- Batman: The Brave and the Bold
- Beast Saga
- Ben 10 (2005)
- Ben 10: Alien Force
- Ben 10: Ultimate Alien
- Ben 10: Omniverse
- Beware the Batman
- BeyWarriors: BeyRaiderz
- BeyWarriors: Cyborg
- BeyWheelz
- Blue Dragon
- Deltora Quest
- Dragon Ball Z
- Dragon Ball Z Kai
- Dragon Ball Super
- Exchange Student Zero (series)
- Gaist Crusher
- Generator Rex
- Green Lantern: The Animated Series
- Hot Wheels Battle Force 5
- Inazuma Eleven
- Inazuma Eleven Go
- Inazuma Eleven Go Galaxy
- Iron Man: Armored Adventures
- Justice League Action
- Justice League Unlimited
- Kamen Rider: Dragon Knight
- Lego Nexo Knights
- Lego Ninjago
- Majin Bone
- Max Steel
- Metal Fight Beyblade
- Metal Fight Beyblade Zero-G
- Mix Master: Final Force
- The Secret Saturdays
- Sonic Boom
- Star Wars: The Clone Wars
- The Super Hero Squad Show
- Superman: The Animated Series
- Sym-Bionic Titan
- Teen Titans
- ThunderCats
- Transformers: Prime
- Transformers: Robots in Disguise
- Wakfu (Season 1 and 2)
- Wolverine and the X-Men
- Xiaolin Chronicles
- Yo-kai Watch
- Young Justice
- Yu-Gi-Oh! 5D's (only 64 episodes)
