= Boomerang (Australian TV channel) =

Australian TV channel

- Country: Australia

Programming
- Language: English
- Picture format: 576i SDTV

Ownership
- Owner: Warner Bros. Discovery Asia-Pacific
- Sister channels: Cartoon Network; CNN International Asia Pacific

History
- Launched: 3 October 1995; 31 years ago (as a programming block); 14 March 2004; 22 years ago (as a standalone TV channel); 2 November 2025; 12 months ago (Fetch TV)
- Closed: 13 May 2025; 18 months ago (Foxtel)

Availability

Streaming media
- Foxtel Go: Channel 715
- Binge: binge.com.au

Boomerang is an Australian children's pay television channel owned by Warner Bros. Discovery International and a sister service of Cartoon Network.

== History and branding ==
Prior to becoming a standalone channel, Boomerang was its own block dedicated to older Hanna-Barbera cartoons launched in 1995 on the U.S. television network.

The Australian feed of the Boomerang Asia service was launched on 14 March 2004, as a part of the Foxtel Digital launch with a line-up very similar to that of the American and British version. Originally devoted to classic animation from studios such as Warner Bros., Metro-Goldwyn-Mayer, and Hanna-Barbera, the channel has since expanded to include more contemporary programming including Poochini. This channel is available as a free trial in a subscription entertainment package on Fetch TV by some ISPs and was added 26 January 2017.

On 1 December 2012, Boomerang launched a refreshed look, using the logo used by Boomerang UK and other European countries, and converted to 16:9 aspect ratio.

On 3 November 2014, Boomerang received a new logo and branding as part of a global rebranding effort. In late 2014, Boomerang had launched Art&Graft redesign which by 2015 came to Asian and Oceanian territories, the United States, and later to Europe, the Middle East and Africa.

On 22 April 2021, the channel was discontinued on Fetch TV, alongside its sister channel Cartoon Network. After that date, the channels became exclusive to Foxtel.

A Cartoonito block launched on 4 July 2022, alongside its Asia counterpart.

The channel, along with Cartoon Network and CNN, were shut down on 13 May 2025 after the removal from Foxtel. Regarding the closure of the channel, a Warner Bros. Discovery spokesperson stated "The Cartoon Network and Boomerang channels have now closed. This much-loved content is now available on our streaming service HBO Max, which Foxtel subscribers have included in their subscription".

Boomerang, along with CNN and Cartoon Network, returned to Australia via Fetch TV on 1 November 2025.

== Programming ==
=== Current programming ===
- Bunnicula
- Roger
- Tom & Jerry Kids

=== Programming for Discovery Kids (Latin America) ===
- Mini Beat Power Rockers

==== Cartoonito programming ====
- Alice & Lewis
- Baby Looney Tunes
- Batwheels
- Bugs Bunny Builders
- Esme & Roy
- Lucas the Spider
- Mecha Builders
- Mittens and Pants
- Petronix Defenders
- Tangranimals
- Toad & Friends
- Vida the Vet

=== Former programming ===
- The Adventures of Bottle Top Bill and His Best Friend Corky
- ALF: The Animated Series
- Alice and Lewis
- Angelo Rules
- A Pup Named Scooby-Doo
- Astro Boy (1980)
- The Banana Splits
- Barbie Dreamhouse Adventures
- The Batman
- Be Cool, Scooby-Doo!
- Ben 10 (2016)
- Ben 10: Omniverse
- Best Furry Friends
- Cake (2006)
- Captain Caveman
- Care Bears: Adventures in Care-a-lot
- The Care Bears Family
- Care Bears: Welcome to Care-a-Lot
- Casper's Scare School
- Cow and Chicken
- Codename: Kids Next Door
- Dexter's Laboratory
- Doraemon
- DreamWorks Dragons
- Duck Dodgers
- Dynomutt, Dog Wonder
- Ed, Edd n Eddy
- The Flintstones
- Fraggle Rock
- Franklin
- The Garfield Show
- Grizzy & the Lemmings
- Help!... It's the Hair Bear Bunch!
- Hong Kong Phooey
- Horrid Henry
- Horseland
- Huckleberry Hound
- Inspector Gadget (1983)
- Inspector Gadget (2015)
- The Jetsons
- Jimmy Two-Shoes
- Johnny Bravo
- Josie and the Pussycats
- Justice League
- Krypto the Superdog
- Lab Rats Challenge
- LEGO Friends
- Legion of Superheroes
- Lippy the Lion and Hardy Har Har
- Looney Tunes
- The Looney Tunes Show
- Madeline
- Magilla Gorilla
- Matt's Monsters
- Monchhichi Tribe
- Mr. Bean: The Animated Series
- Mush Mush & the Mushables
- My Knight and Me
- My Little Pony: Friendship Is Magic
- My Little Pony: Pony Life
- The Mysterious Cities of Gold (1982)
- New Looney Tunes
- Oggy and the Cockroaches
- Out of Jimmy's Head
- Ozie Boo!
- Pat the Dog
- The Perils of Penelope Pitstop
- Pingu in the City
- The Pink Panther Show
- Pink Panther and Pals
- Pixie and Dixie and Mr. Jinks
- Popeye
- Postman Pat
- The Powerpuff Girls (1998)
- Powerpuff Girls Z
- Quick Draw McGraw
- Sabrina the Teenage Witch
- Sabrina's Secret Life
- Samurai Jack
- The New Scooby and Scrappy-Doo Show
- Scooby-Doo and Guess Who?
- Scooby-Doo! Mystery Incorporated
- The Scooby-Doo Show
- Scooby-Doo, Where Are You!
- Sheep in the Big City
- The Smurfs (1981)
- Snagglepuss
- Sonic Boom
- Strawberry Shortcake (2003)
- Strawberry Shortcake's Berry Bitty Adventures
- The Sylvester & Tweety Mysteries
- Thomas & Friends (series 12–13 only)
- Time Squad
- Tricky TV
- Tom and Jerry
- Tom & Jerry Kids
- The Tom and Jerry Comedy Show
- The Tom and Jerry Show (2014)
- Tom and Jerry Tales
- Top Cat
- Transformers: Rescue Bots
- We Bare Bears
- Winx Club
- Xiaolin Showdown
- Yabba Dabba Dinosaurs
- Yogi Bear
- The ZhuZhus

== Logos ==
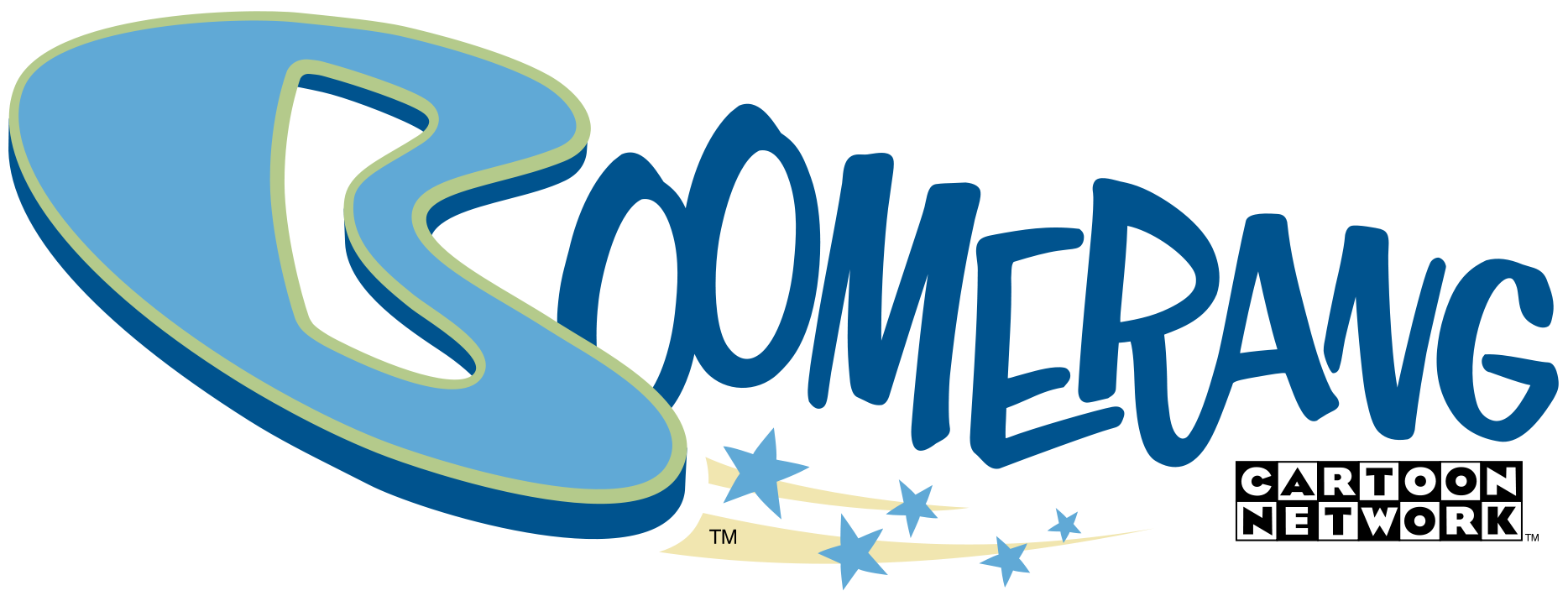
14 March 2004 – 1 November 2007

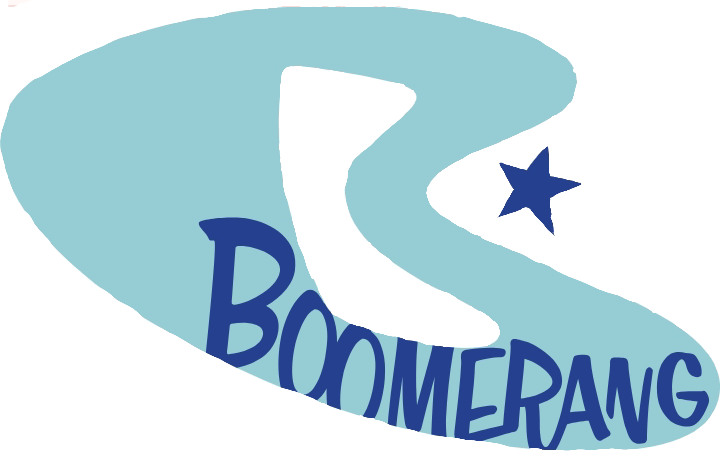
1 November 2007 - 1 December 2012

1 December 2012 – 3 November 2014

3 November 2014 – present

== See also ==
- Cartoonito
- The Cartoon Network, Inc.
