= Cha-ching =

Cha-ching, Chaching, Cha-Ching, Cha Ching, or CHA-CHING may refer to:

- The sound of a cash register

- By extension, something associated with monetary wealth

== Music and entertainment ==
=== Songs ===
- "Cha-Ching", a 2007 pop rock song by Hedley
- "Cha Ching" (Slayyyter song), a 2019 song by Slayyyter
- "Cha-Ching!", a song from the 2018 album Grandma by Unique
- "Cha-Ching (Till We Grow Older)", a song from the 2012 album Night Visions by Imagine Dragons

=== Other ===
- Cha-Ching!, a 2013 novel by Ali Liebegott
- Cha-Ching Records, a record label owned by Tony D
- Cha-Ching Pictures, which produced the 2009 short film The Ballad of G.I. Joe
- Cha-Ching, a show in the List of programs broadcast by Cartoon Network (Southeast Asia)

== Other uses ==
- Jajang, Iran (also spelled as "Chaching"), a village in eastern Iran
- CHA-CHING, a brand offered by the American supermarket chain Food Lion; see Food Lion#Store products
