= Time Bokan 24 =

Japanese anime television series

タイムボカン 24 (Taimubokan Nijū Yon)
- Genre: Comedy, science fiction
- Created by: Tatsunoko Production Level-5
- Anime television series
- Directed by: Takayuki Inagaki
- Produced by: Koji Nagai; Toshiyuki Watanabe
- Written by: Yoichi Kato
- Music by: Hitoshi Minowa
- Studio: Tatsunoko Production
- Licensed by: NA: Crunchyroll; SEA: Muse Communication
- Original network: NNS (ytv, Nippon TV)
- English network: PH: Cartoon Network; SEA: Cartoon Network
- Original run: October 1, 2016 – March 18, 2017
- Episodes: 24
- Anime television series

Time Bokan: The Villains' Strike Back
- Directed by: Takayuki Inagaki
- Produced by: Koji Nagai; Toshiyuki Watanabe
- Written by: Yoichi Kato
- Music by: Hitoshi Minowa
- Studio: Tatsunoko Production
- Licensed by: NA: Crunchyroll
- Original network: NNS (ytv, Nippon TV)
- Original run: October 7, 2017 – March 24, 2018
- Episodes: 24

Time Bokan 24 (タイムボカン 24, Taimubokan Nijū Yon) is a Japanese anime series co-produced by Yomiuri TV and Tatsunoko Production that is a re-imagining of the original Time Bokan series that debuted on October 1, 2016, featuring a team of time travelers in search for the "True History" that is not written in the textbooks. The series is part of a joint collaboration between Tatsunoko & Level-5. This series is also legally streamed by Crunchyroll in certain worldwide areas. A second season titled Time Bokan: The Villains' Strike Back (タイムボカン 逆襲の三悪人, Taimubokan: Gyakushū no San-Akunin) started airing in October 2017. In late 2019, an English dub began airing on the Filipino and Southeast Asian Cartoon Network channels. The dub made edits such as making Calen's skirt more opaque and modest. The same edits are also applied to the Korean dub.

== Plot ==
Tokio is a junior high student living in the present time who is recruited to be a member of the 24th century's Space-Time Administration Bureau. Together with his partner Calen, their mission is to uncover the "True History", the part of history the textbooks don't tell, but in their way is the Akudama Trio that intends to prevent the True History from being revealed for their own personal gains.

== Cast ==
=== Space-Time Administration Bureau ===
Tokio (トキオ)
Voiced by: Akihisa Wakayama
The male protagonist and a 14-year-old boy in the 8th grade from the year 2016 who is recruited by the Space-Time Administration Bureau after it is discovered that he is able to withstand the time travel phenomena known as "Time Bokan". He has a habit of breaking the fourth wall when the situations around him seem too weird or incredible.
Calen (カレン)
Voiced by: Akari Kitō
The female protagonist and a 17-year-old veteran from the Space-Time Administration Bureau who becomes Tokio's partner. Aside from seeking the True History, she also travels around time looking for a lost love of the past.
Pikobo (ピコボー)
Voiced by: Rikako Aikawa
Tokio and Calen's robot companion. His ability is to summon auxiliary mecha to increase their vehicle, the Mechabutton's power while fighting the Akudama Trio. Pikobo appears in the first season.
Peralino (ペラリーノ)
Voiced by: Takeshi Maeda
Calen's parrot companion. He has the habit of adding "-pera" in the end of its sentences. Peralino appears in the first season.
O-3 (オースリー)
Voiced by: Kenjiro Tsuda
O-3 is the new robot companion in the second season. O-3 is perverse but possesses humans emotions and he is in love in Calen, but O-3 has a secret.
Commander (司令官)
Voiced by: Ryunosuke Watanuki
Commander of the Space-Time Administration Bureau (JKK) who orders the missions to Tokio and Calen. Sometimes he is saddened when someone interrupts him. Commander only appears in the first season.
Dasanai-San (ださない)
Voiced by: Ryo Sugisaki
Dasanai-San is the engineer and mechanic of 24 mechas in the JKK. He can be rude, but admire the mechas and prefer to liberate it when they are ready.
Dekinai (できない)
Voiced by: Shinsuke Sugawara
Dekinai is the engineer in the JKK. He usually does his hobby that is building pyramids with towers or playing cards, but the pyramids fall.
Mirei (みれい)
Voiced by: Yūko Minaguchi
She is the new commander in the second season. Mirei is beautiful and sweet, but she has a secret that is hiding an aggressive personality. Confirmed that she has a relationship with Bimajo.

=== History Paradise/Akudama Trio ===
Bimajo (ビマージョ)

Real Name: Yoshiko (ヨシコ)

Voiced by: Eri Kitamura
The only woman of the Akudama Trio with the habit of bossing around the other two. Whenever they are about to fail, she imagines herself in luxurious fantasies.
Tsubuyakky (ツブヤッキー)
Voiced by: Hiroaki Hirata
A short, skinny man who is the technician of the Akudama Trio responsible with building the group's mecha. He likes to tweet about almost everything.
Suzukky (スズッキー)
Voiced by: Kenta Miyake
A tall, muscular man who has strong arms. He is an intern of the Akudama Trio.
Oyadarma (オヤダーマ)
Voiced by: Hori
The owner of History Paradise and the Akudama Trio's employer. His company is the main source of History textbooks in the world in the 24th century and thus he sends the Akudama Trio to thwart Tokio and Calen's efforts to uncover the True History in order to avoid unnecessary revisions.
In the later episode(especially in season 2), revealed that his goal is to get Dynamonds to change history for his own.

== Episodes ==
=== Time Bokan 24 (2016–2017) ===
In this first season, the OP song was "Fantastic Time" (ep 1–12) and "OVER THE TOP" (ep 13–24) both by Hey! Say! JUMP and the ED was "TRUE LOVE" (ep 1–12) by Ai Shinozaki and "Gekiyaba ∞ Bokkaan!!" (ep 13–24) by Moso Calibration.

No.	Title	Location	Original release date
1	"Cleopatra Was Actually a Comedy Duo Known as Cleo and Patra!" "Kureopatora wa Kureo to patora to iu manzai konbidatta!" (クレオパトラはクレ夫とパトラという漫才コンビだった!)	Egypt, 50 BC	October 1, 2016
Time traveler Calen is hopping through time, trying to get away from Akudarma Trio. After a direct hit, she is forced to crash land in 2016 and encounters a boy named Tokio. The Akudarma Trio is right behind, so she has no choice but to take Tokio with her to the 24th century to escape. There, Tokio discovers Calen works for the JKK, an organization which has staff traveling through time, trying to find out the True History. Tokio then finds himself travelling with Calen to Ancient Egypt to find out the truth about Cleopatra.
2	"The Wright Brothers Were Actually an Only Child!" "Raito kyōdai wa hitorikkodatta!" (ライト兄弟はひとりっ子だった!)	North Carolina, United States, 1903 AD	October 8, 2016
Tokio and Calen travel to North Carolina in 1903 in order to find the True History behind the Wright Brothers. The Wright Brothers they met there were not making planes, let alone bicycles. But they were apparently brothers just happened to make "lights" for bicycles. However, there seemed to be something wrong with the younger brother, Orville. Akudarma wants to keep the history as it is in the textbooks and tries to get Wright to fly a plane, and appears that Tsubuyakky has a plan.
3	"Momotaro Was Actually More of an Ogre than an Actual Ogre!" "Momotarō wa oni yori mo onidatta!" (桃太郎は鬼よりも鬼だった!)	Ancient Japan	October 15, 2016
Tokio and Calen go to Onigashima to find the next True History. They find a red ogre who tells them that he was punished by someone more ogre-like than actual ogres and starts crying. He leads them to a stage, where loud music is playing, and the one on stage who has all the female ogres' attention is a super hot Momotaro.
4	"Dinosaurs Were Humans' Pets!" "Kyōryū wa ningen no pettodatta!" (恐竜は人間のペットだった!)	Mesozoic Era	October 22, 2016
This time, they travel to the Mesozoic Era. They arrive to a jungle in the Mesozoic Era and find a True History signal. Right when they get there, a dinosaur pops out, but it has a ribbon on and they find out dinosaurs are pets. Tokio mentions he wants a T-Rex for a pet but then Mechabuton gets taken. At this rate, they won't be able to return to their own time.
5	"Halloween's Trick or Treat Was Actually Tottori or Shimane!" "Harowin no torikku oa torīto wa Tottori or Shimanedatta!" (ハロウィンのトリック・オア・トリートは鳥取or島根だった!)	Tottori Sand Dunes, Japan, 1881 AD	October 29, 2016
This time, it's the True History about Halloween, but the place they arrive is the Tottori Desert in the 4th year of the Meiji Era. Tokio and Calen meet the host, Fukuzawa-san, who they think they've seen before. Apparently people mistake Tottori and Shimane quite often, so he holds a quiz about them, which starts on October 31st. Akudarma won't allow for such a punny history, so they also participate in the quiz.
6	"Shibuya's Hachiko Was Actually a Bee!" "Shibuya no Hachikō wa hachidatta!" (渋谷のハチ公は蜂だった!)	Shibuya Station, Tokyo, Japan, 1933 AD	November 5, 2016
Tokio and Calen arrive to Shibuya Station in the 8th year of Showa to find the True History about Hachiko. They immediately find a dog waiting outside the station. They figure it must be Hachiko and go over to him. Just then, they get a True History signal, but can't seem to find Hachiko. Soon they find that it is not a dog, but a bee Hachiko. Akudarma shows up once again to get in their way of the True History.
7	"What Columbus Discovered Was Not a New Continent, But a New Exercise Called Gymnastics!" "Koronbusu ga hakken shita no wa shintairiku dewanaku shintaisōdatta!" (コロンブスが発見したのは新大陸ではなく新体操だった!)	Palos de la Frontera, Andalusia, Spain, 1498 AD	November 12, 2016
Tokio and Calen go back to Spain in 1492 to find the true history about Columbus and his journey to find the new continent, but when they find him, they realize he has no interest in a new continent, but is trying to discover the next new exercise.
8	"Seton Animal Chronicles Was Actually Donut Chronicles!" "Shīton no dōbutsu-ki wa dōnatsu-kidatta!" (シートンの動物記はドーナツ記だった!)	New York City, New York, United States, 1898 AD	November 19, 2016
Tokio and Calen arrive to New York in the late 1800s to discover the True History about Seton's Animal Chronicles. When they arrive, they find out Seton wasn't trying to chronicle animals, but donuts instead.
9	"Gagarin's Famous Quote Was, "The Earth Is ______"!" "Gagārin no meigen wa `chikyū wa ￮￮datta!'" (ガガーリンの名言は「地球は〇〇だった！」)	Baikonur Cosmodrome, Soviet Union (Kazakhstan), 1961 AD	November 26, 2016
In order to find out the True History about Gagarin, who was famous for saying the Earth was blue, Tokio and Calen head back to the Soviet Union in 1961. They find some astronaut trainees and immediately find Akudarma is already there. Gagarin comes in between them, saying it's not right to fight underneath the blue sky, but he seems extremely interested in Tokio. This time, they can't seem to find a True History signal very easily, so they head to Space with Gagarin.
10	"The Land-taking Battle During the Warring States Era Was Actually a _____ Battle!" "Sengoku jidai no kunitorigassen wa ￮￮ gassendatta!" (戦国時代の国盗り合戦は〇〇合戦だった！)	Owari Province, Japan, 1560 AD	December 3, 2016
11	"Guns First Being Introduced to Japan Was Actually ______ First Being Introduced to Japan!" "Teppō denrai wa ￮￮ denraidatta!" (鉄砲伝来は〇〇伝来だった！)	Tanegashima, Kagoshima Prefecture, Japan, 1543 AD	December 10, 2016
12	"Joan of Arc was the First ______!" "Jan'nu daruku wa shodai ￮￮datta!" (ジャンヌ・ダルクは初代〇〇だった！)	Orléans, central France, 1429 AD	December 17, 2016
13	"Santa Claus Was Actually ______!" "Santakurōsu wa ￮￮datta!" (サンタクロースは〇〇だった！)	Greenland, 2016 AD	December 24, 2016
14	"The Ninja Hattori Hanzō Was Actually a ______!" "Ninja hattori hanzō wa ￮￮datta!" (忍者 服部半蔵は〇〇だった！)	Suruga Province (Shizuoka Prefecture) Japan, 1585 AD	January 7, 2017
15	"Pythagoras Was Actually a Genius of ______!" "Pitagorasu wa ￮￮ no tensaidatta!" (ピタゴラスは〇〇の天才だった！)	Crotone, Southern Italy (Ancient Greece), 500 BC	January 14, 2017
16	"Galileo Galilei Was Actually a ______!" "Gari Reo Gari Rei wa ￮￮datta!" (ガリレオ・ガリレイは〇〇だった！)	Pisa, Italy, 1589 AD	January 21, 2017
17	"What Sanzo Hoshi Was Striving For Was the World's Best ______!" "Sanzo hōshi ga mezashita no wa sekaiichi no ￮￮datta!" (三蔵法師が目指したのは世界一の〇〇だった！)	Tang-dynasty China, 629 AD	January 28, 2017
18	"The Nazca Lines Were __________!" "Nasukanochijōe wa ￮￮datta!" (ナスカの地上絵は〇〇だった！)	Peru, South America, Era of the Nazca Civilization	February 4, 2017
19	"Murasaki Shikibu was Actually a _____!" "Murasaki Shikibu wa ￮￮datta!" (紫式部は〇〇だった！)	Heian-kyō (Kyoto), Japan, 1008 AD	February 11, 2017
20	"The Shinsengumi was Actually a _____ Group!" "Shinsenkumi wa hito ￮￮ shūdandatta!" (新撰組は人〇〇集団だった！)	Kyoto, Japan, 1864	February 18, 2017
21	"Versailles Was Actually a ________ Center!" "Verusaiyu kyūden wa ￮￮ sentādatta!" (ヴェルサイユ宮殿は〇〇センターだった！)	Versailles Palace, Paris, France, 18th Century AD	February 25, 2017
Tokio and Calen travel to Paris and meet to Archduchy Marie Antoinette
22	"America's Moon Landing Was Staged!" "Amerika no getsumen chakuriku wa yarasedatta!" (アメリカの月面着陸はヤラセだった！！)	Hollywood, California, United States, July 1969 AD	March 4, 2017
23	"Nightingale Was Actually the ________ in White!" "Naichingēru wa hakui no ￮￮datta!" (ナイチンゲールは白衣の〇〇だった！)	Florence, Grand Duchy of Tuscany, Italy, May 12, 1820 AD	March 11, 2017
24	"The Genius da Vinci Was the Final Episode!" "Tensai da vu~inchi ga saishūkaidatta!" (天才ダ・ヴィンチが最終回だった！)	Vinci, Republic of Florence, Italy, 1500s AD	March 18, 2017

=== The Villains' Strike Back (2017–2018) ===
In the second season, the OP was DESTINY (ep 1–12) by KinKi Kids and "WANTED GIRL" (ep 13–24) by TrySail and the ED was 20xx (ep 1–12) by Yumemiru Adolescence and "Topaz Love" (ep 13–24) by KinKi Kids.

No.	Title	Location	Original release date
1	"What's the Super Surprising Connection Between the Genius Inventor Edison and Japan?!" "Tensai hatsumei-ka Ejison to Nihon no bikkuridokkirina kankei to wa!?" (天才発明家 エジソンと日本のビックリドッキリな関係とは！？)	New Jersey, United States, Late 1800s AD	October 7, 2017
2	"What Was the Super Surprising Job that the God of Baseball, Babe Ruth, Tried to Do?!" "Yakyū no kami bēbu rūsu ga yarou to shite ita bikkuridokkirina shigoto to wa!?" (野球の神 ベーブ・ルースがやろうとしていたビックリドッキリな仕事とは!?)	New York City, New York, United States, October 15, 1923 AD	October 14, 2017
3	"What Super Surprising Thing Was the Mercenary of the Bakumatsu, Sakamoto Ryoma, the First to Do in Japan?!" "Bakumatsu no fūunji sakamoto ryōma ga Nihon de hajimete itta bikkuridokkirina koto to wa!?" (幕末の風雲児 坂本龍馬が日本で初めて行ったビックリドッキリなこととは!?)	Shiobitashi Hot Spring, Kagoshima, Japan, 1866 AD	October 21, 2017
4	"What Super Surprising Thing Was the Author of Sherlock Holmes, Arthur Conan Doyle, Obsessed With?!" "Hōmuzu o unda Konan Doiru ga muchū ni natte ita bikkuridokkirina koto to wa!?" (ホームズを生んだコナン・ドイルが夢中になっていたビックリドッキリなこととは!?)	London, England, UK, Early 1900s AD	October 28, 2017
5	"What Super Surprising Food Was the Great Author Natsume Soseki Obsessed With?!" "Bungō natsume sōseki ga muchūdatta bikkuridokkirina tabemono to wa!?" (文豪 夏目漱石が夢中だったビックリドッキリな食べ物とは!?)	Ginza, Tokyo, Japan, 38th Year of Meiji Period / 1905 AD	November 4, 2017
6	"What's the Super Surprising Way That Even You Can Become the World-Renowned Heroine, the Little Mermaid?!" "Sekai-tekina hiroin ningyo hime ni anata mo nareru bikkuridokkirina hōhō to wa!?" (世界的なヒロイン 人魚姫にあなたもなれるビックリドッキリな方法とは!?)	Denmark, 19th Century AD	November 11, 2017
The three villains and Tokio and Calen travel back to Denmark, 19th century AD and meet the author of "The Little Mermaid", Hans Christian Andersen.
7	"The Shogun Loves to Save Money?! What Was Tokugawa Ieyasu's Super Surprising Method of Saving Money?!" "Shōgun wa chokin suki!? Tokugawa ieyasu no bikkuridokkirina setsuyaku-jutsu to wa!?" (将軍は貯金好き!? 徳川家康のビックリドッキリな節約術とは!?)	Edo Castle, Japan, 1605 AD	November 18, 2017
8	"Methods That Can Still Be Used Today! What Was Yang Guifei's Super Surprising Beauty Regimen?!" "Imademo Mane dekiru! Yōkihi no bikkuridokkirina biyō-hō to wa!?" (今でもマネできる！楊貴妃のビックリドッキリな美容法とは!?)	Chang'an (Xi'an), Tang Dynasty, China, 745 AD	November 25, 2017
The three villains and Tokio and Calen travel back to meet to Yokihi or better known as Yang Guifei.
9	"What's Mito Komon's Super Surprising Connection with NTV Announcer Miura Asami?!" "Mito Kōmon to Nihon terebi miura-ana no bikkuridokkirina kankei to wa!?" (水戸黄門と日本テレビ水卜アナのビックリドッキリな関係とは!?)	Mito Domain (Ibaraki Prefecture), Japan, 1697 AD; Yugawara, Kanagawa Prefecture, Japan, 2017 AD	December 2, 2017
The Nihon TV host, Miura Asami, accompanies with the trio, while Akudama meets with the daimyo, Mito Komon.
10	"What Were the Super Surprising Treasures that Kukai Found All Over Japan?!" "Kūkai ga sagashiateta nihonkakuchi no bikkuridokkirina otakara to wa!?" (空海が探し当てた日本各地のビックリドッキリなお宝とは!?)	Heian-kyo (Kyoto), Japan, 9th century AD	December 9, 2017
The characters meets the monk of the Kanjis.
11	"What was Napoleon's Super Surprising Method of Getting a Good Night's Sleep When He Supposedly Only Slept 3 Hours?!" "3-Jikan shika nenai to iu Naporeon mo bikkuridokkirina anmin-hō to wa!?" (3時間しか寝ないというナポレオンもビックリドッキリな安眠法とは!?)	Alps, Great St. Bernard Pass, Switzerland, 1800 AD; Paris, France, 1804 AD	December 16, 2017
Tokio and Calen compete against Trio Akudama for search a different and comfortable form for sleep and help to Napoleon.
12	"Announcer Fukuzawa Appears Once Again! The Statue of Liberty Ultra Quiz!" "Fukuzawa ana mata kenzan! Jiyūnomegami urutorakuizu!" (福澤アナまた見参！自由の女神ウルトラクイズ！)	New York City, New York, United States, 1886 AD	December 23, 2017
Tokio and Calen compete against Trio Akudama in a contest about curiosities of the Statue of Liberty with the TV show host, Fukuzawa Akira (Arthur Fukuzawa).
13	"What's the Super Surprising Reason the Famous Japanese Ukiyo-e Artist Katsushika Hokusai Moved 93 Times?!" "Nihon ga sekai ni hokoru ukiyoe-shi katsushika hokusai ga 93-kai mo hikkoshita bikkuridokkirina riyū to wa!?" (日本が世界に誇る浮世絵師葛飾北斎が93回も引っ越したビックリドッキリな理由とは!?)	Asakusa, Edo (Tokyo), Japan, 1831 AD	January 6, 2018
14	"What Super Surprising Catch Phrase Did the Famous Inventor, Hiraga Gennai, Think Up That We Still Use Today?!" "Hatsumei-ka hiraga gen'nai ga kangaeta, ima demo min'na ga shitteru bikkuridokkirina kyatchikopī to wa!?" (発明家平賀源内が考えた、今でもみんなが知ってるビックリドッキリなキャッチコピーとは!?)	Edo (Tokyo), Japan, 1776 AD	January 13, 2018
15	"What Was the God of Education, Sugawara no Michizane's Super Surprising Legend About Being a Genius?!" "Gakumon no kamisama Sugawaranomichizane no bikkuridokkirina tensai densetsu to wa!?" (学問の神様 菅原道真のビックリドッキリな天才伝説とは!?)	Heian-kyo (Kyoto), Japan, 900 AD	January 20, 2018
16	"What's the Super Surprising Reason Beethoven Looks So Scary in His Portrait?!" "Bētōvu~en no shōzō-ga ga kowai kao ni natte iru bikkuridokkirina riyū to wa!?" (ベートーヴェンの肖像画が怖い顔になっているビックリドッキリな理由とは!?)	Vienna, Austrian Empire (Austria), 1819 AD	January 27, 2018
17	"What's the Super Surprising Reason One of the Major Players of the Meiji Restoration, Saigō Takamori, Had a Dog?!" "Meijiishin no tateyakusha saigō takamori ga inu o tsurete ita bikkuridokkirina riyū to wa!?" (明治維新の立役者 西郷隆盛が犬を連れていたビックリドッキリな理由とは!?)	Kyoto, Japan, March 7, 1866 AD; Tokyo, Japan, 1870 AD	February 3, 2018
18	"Kasuga no Tsubone Was the Daughter of a Traitor! What Was the Super Surprising Reason She Climbed to the Top of the Ooku?" "Kasuganotsubone wa uragirimono no musumedatta! Ōoku no chōten ni noboritsumeta bikkuridokkirina riyū to wa!?" (春日局は裏切り者の娘だった！ 大奥の頂点にのぼりつめたビックリドッキリな理由とは!?)	Edo Castle, Edo (Tokyo), Japan, Beginning of the 17th century AD	February 10, 2018
The three villains travel back in time to Edo Castle in the early 17th century and meet Kasuga no Tsubone.
19	"Imoto Is a Historical Figure?! What's the Super Surprising Problem That the Beast Hunter Imoto Ayako Has?!" "Imoto ga ijin!? Chinjū hantāimotoayako no bikkuridokkirina nayami to wa!?" (イモトが偉人！？珍獣ハンターイモトアヤコのビックリドッキリな悩みとは！？?)	Amazon Rainforest, Brazil, 2028 AD	February 17, 2018
20	"Alexander Graham Bell Invented the Telephone! What Super Surprising Struggle Led to Its Creation?!" "Denwa o hatsumei shita Gurahamu beru! Denwa no tanjō o meguru bikkuridokkirina arasoi to wa!?" (電話を発明したグラハム・ベル！ 電話の誕生をめぐるビックリドッキリな争いとは!?)	Boston, Massachusetts, United States, March 10, 1876 AD	February 24, 2018
21	"Matsuo Basho Was a Ninja?! What's the Super Surprising Truth Behind the "Trip for The Narrow Road to the Interior?!"" "Matsuo bashō wa ninjadatta!? Oku no hoso-dō no bikkuridokkirina tabi no shinsō to wa!?" (松尾芭蕉はニンジャだった!? おくのほそ道のビックリドッキリな旅の真相とは!?)	Fukagawa, Edo (Tokyo), Japan, 1689 AD	March 3, 2018
22	"The Inescapable Alcatraz Prison! What Super Surprising and Ridiculous Plans Were Used to Prevent Escape?!" "Datsugoku fukanōna arukatorazu keimusho! Datsugoku sa senai tame no chō sho ̄ mo nai bikkuridokkirina sakusen to wa!?" (脱獄不可能なアルカトラズ刑務所！ 脱獄させないための超しょーもないビックリドッキリな作戦とは!?)	Alcatraz Prison, San Francisco Bay, San Francisco, California, USA, 1960 AD	March 10, 2018
23	"A Major Player of the Genpei War! What's the Super Surprising Reason Minamoto no Yoshitsune Was Able to Defeat Benkei?!" "Genpeigassen de katsuyaku! Minamotonoyoshitsune ga Benkei ni uchikatta bikkuridokkirina riyū to wa!?" (源平合戦で活躍！ 源義経が弁慶に打ち勝ったビックリドッキリな理由とは!?)	Kyoto, Japan, 1169 AD	March 17, 2018
The Three Villains travel to 1169 Kyoto and see Musashibo Benkei defeated by Minamoto no Yoshitsune.
24	"The Ranking That Prince Shotoku Came Up With: The Twelve Bokan Ranking System! And What Will Become of Bimajo?!" "Ano Shōtoku taishi ga kimeru kakudzuke rankingu "bo kan'ijūnikai"! Soshite bimājo no yukue wa!?" (あの聖徳太子が決める格付けランキング『ボ冠位十二階』！そしてビマージョの行方は!?)	Asuka Region, Japan, 607 AD	March 24, 2018
The Three Villains travel to 607 Asuka period Japan and meet Prince Shotoku.
