= Boomerang (Asian TV channel) =

Southeast Asian TV channel

- Broadcast area: Asia
- Headquarters: Singapore

Programming
- Languages: English; Chinese; Malay; Indonesian; Thai; Vietnamese
- Picture format: 1080i HDTV (downscaled to 576i/480i for the SDTV feed)

Ownership
- Owner: Warner Bros. Discovery Asia-Pacific
- Sister channels: Cartoon Network Asia; Cartoon Network Philippines; CNN International; Cinemax Asia; HBO Asia tvN Asia tvN Movies; HLN; Warner TV

History
- Launched: 14 March 2004; 22 years ago (original); 1 January 2015; 11 years ago (relaunch)
- Replaced: Cartoonito (original)
- Closed: 1 December 2012; 13 years ago (original); 28 July 2023; 3 years ago (relaunch)
- Replaced by: Toonami (original); Cartoonito (relaunch)

Boomerang (currently rebranded as Boom in Thailand) was (and still is in Thailand) a pan-Asian cable and satellite television channel owned by Warner Bros. Discovery International. Like the original US version, this localization first began as a programming block that aired on Cartoon Network Asia (from 2001 to 2005), before becoming its own channel in 2004.

On 1 December 2012, the channel was shut down and replaced with Toonami Asia. Eventually, the channel was relaunched on 1 January 2015 as part of Boomerang's 2015 global rebranding effort, replacing Cartoonito Asia.

The channel (except in Thailand) was replaced by Cartoonito on 28 July 2023. This mark the second time Cartoonito Asia launched as a linear TV channel, as other big names such as Disney Junior and Nick Jr. head into the streaming portfolio.

== Programming ==
- Boomeraction – a block which, as its name suggests, consisted of classic action-oriented shows such as Jonny Quest, Birdman and the Galaxy Trio, Sealab 2020 and among others. The block aired weekdays at 5:00pm.
- Boom! Boom! Boom! – an unstoppable weekend block with no commercial interruptions, which featured all-time toon favorites.
- Tiny TV – began airing on 1 March 2010, and was shown each weekday from 9:00am to 2:00pm. Previously, the block aired younger-skewing versions of classic Warner Bros. and Hanna-Barbera cartoons (such as The Flintstone Kids, Baby Looney Tunes, Tom & Jerry Kids, and A Pup Named Scooby-Doo), but eventually introduced other acquired toddler-themed cartoons like Postman Pat and Care Bears: Adventures in Care-a-lot.
- Boomerang Theatre – Boomerang's movie block.
- Boomysteries – a mystery-themed late night block that aired on weekends at 11:00pm, which featured the strangest but mysterious toon stories ever.
- Boomeracers – a car-racing-themed programming block that aired weekdays at 1:30pm.
- The Zoo – an animal-themed programming block that aired weekdays at 9:00 to 11:00am. As with Boomeracers, The Zoo was a spinoff of the Boomerang block of the same name, and has aired in the United Kingdom as well.
- The Big Bucket – Boomerang's marathon block. Started in June 2006, The Big Bucket featured a three-hour marathon of Boomerang's Character of the Month.
- Free Classic – Boomerang's cartoon classic block. Started in July 2007, Free Classic featured a five-hour cartoon classic of Boomerang's Character of the Month.
- Boomerang on TV5 Kids – A weekday afternoon Boomerang-themed block ran on TV5 Kids from September 2015 and September 2017. Its programming came straight from the pan-Asian feed (with a few from its Oceanic counterpart. Since October 2017, the Boomerang block on TV5 Network Philippines was dropped out due to preparing for the collaboration with the U.S.-based sports channel, ESPN; which is formerly in the Philippines since December 2017 (during the 2016–2017 PBA Governor's Cup Finals). It was "ESPN5" (formerly "Sports5") until it was rebranded as One Sports on 8 March 2020.

Logo used in Thailand from August 14, 2013 to March 14, 2024.

== Feeds ==
=== Thailand ===
Boomerang Asia was originally broadcast in Thailand from its launch in March 2004 until its closure in December 2012. On 14 August 2013, a localized Thai feed was launched on TrueVisions, using the logo and branding developed by Mainframe for Boomerang UK and other European countries. Boomerang Thailand retained the EMEA branding until it rebranded with the 2015 logo and 2018 branding seen throughout the world on 15 March 2024. On 27 May 2025, the channel rebranded and changed its name to simply Boom.

=== Malaysia ===
Due to a decision that was made following the cessation of TA-DAA! on Astro, the channel ceased on Astro on 1 February 2023, and was replaced by CBeebies, while Unifi TV still aired that channel until its rebranding as Cartoonito on 28 July 2023.

=== Philippines ===
In the Philippines, Boomerang broadcast as a channel and also had a block on TV5 Kids that ran from September 2015 to October 2017. The block was in the Filipino language.

=== Japan ===
In Japan, Boomerang Asia was launched in 2004 and aired via satellite. It broadcast in Japanese. Boomerang Asia's original feed launched on 14 March 2004 was broadcast in Japan until the channel closed on 1 December 2012. It relaunched as an independent feed was launched from January 2018 to 31 March 2022.

=== India ===
In India, Boomerang was able to be viewed via DishTV India. The Indian feed ceased broadcasting on 2 March 2009 along with Turner Classic Movies Asia.

== Logos ==
14 March 2004 – 1 November 2007

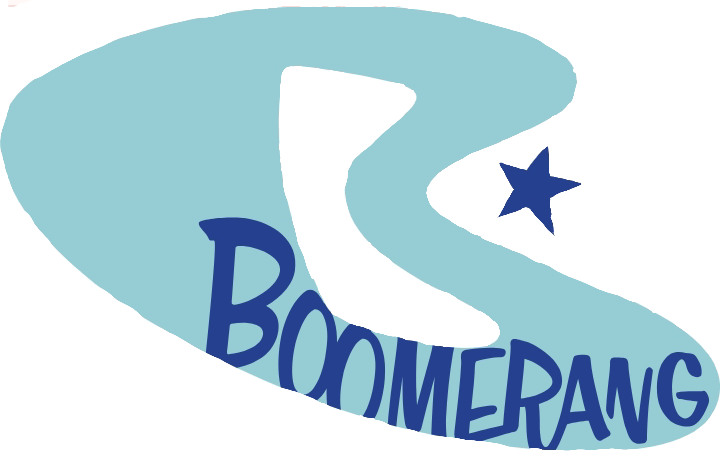
1 November 2007 - 1 December 2012

1 January 2015 – 28 July 2023
