= Bboongbboong-E =

Korean Animation TV show

Bboongbboong (also called 'Farting King Pung Pung') is a children's television program produced by Educational Broadcasting System (EBS). Broadcasting began on March 3, 2000 and ended on August 25, 2022. The show attempts to help children to think and develop their language, expression, and social skills. The characters such as Bboongbboong-E let the children join in the TV show. The main character Bboongbboong-E's fart has many magical effects.

The series was also broadcast at the beginning of Cartoon Network Korea's existence in 2006, part of the Tiny TV block.

== Characters ==
- Jajan Bro: MC of the show
- Bboongbboong-E 만화 캐릭터
- Ppickppick-E
- Chichi
- Bboongsoon-E
- Bboongdor-I
- Kao
- Congraturation BangBangBang
- Lalala Band
- Exiting Band
- Fun Fun Band
- Egu
- Mukku
- Ppangku & Ppongku
- Aeongttungsem
- Bboong-car
- Bboong-chi
- Donidoni
- Hoshi
- Tamtam
- Ipari

=== Former characters ===
Bboongdol-E and Bboongsoon-E were dropped to reduce animation costs. Recently, Bboongsoon-E returned. In one episode, Bboongsoon-E and Bboonbboong-E got married.

== Band ==
Usually the band called 'Congraturation BangBangBang' provided music for the show, although 'Fun Fun Band' also performed.

== Daily Episodes ==
- Monday — Bboongbboong-E Song Show
- Tuesday — Body Play
- Wednesday — Good Habits Play

== Awards ==
- Year 2001 Korean Best television show
- Year 2002 Korean best television character
- Year 2003 Korean best television character
