= CNN International Asia Pacific =

Television news channel

- CNN International Asia Pacific logo
- Country: Hong Kong; Taiwan
- Broadcast area: Southeast Asia, Taiwan, Hong Kong, Macau, Japan, South Korea, and Oceania (except Mainland China and North Korea)
- Network: CNN International; CNN
- Headquarters: Hong Kong

Programming
- Language: English
- Picture format: 1080p HDTV (downscaled to 576i/480i for the SDTV feed)

Ownership
- Owner: Skydance
- Sister channels: CNN; CNN-News18; CNN Indonesia; CNN en Español; HLN; Cinemax; HBO; Cartoonito; Cartoon Network; Warner TV

History
- Launched: 1 August 1989; 37 years ago

Links
- Website: CNN.com

CNN International Asia Pacific is the Asia-Pacific edition of the CNN International pay-TV cable network. The feed originates from Hong Kong and Indonesia. It officially launched on 1 August 1989.

From 1997 until 2005, this edition included exclusive programmes to the Asia-Pacific region such as Asia This Day, CNN This Morning (Asian edition), News Biz Today and Asia Tonight.

The amount of live programming on CNN International Asia Pacific in 1999 was five hours a day, rising from a mere two-and-a-quarter hours.

Since mid-2003, News Biz Today and Asia Tonight (which were eventually renamed CNN Today and World News Asia respectively) were simulcast on the other editions of CNN International. Other programming differences included airing reruns of key programmes like Amanpour and varying showtimes of weekend magazine programmes when live news is shown elsewhere to allow Asia-Pacific audiences to watch them at a similar time slots to their counterparts elsewhere.

In addition, from 1995 to 2004, to differentiate the Asia Pacific feed from the other feeds, the network logo on the lower-right hand of the screen had a static globe with the Asian continent facing the audiences.

Today, the differences between the Asia-Pacific feed and the other feeds are minimal and are now limited to advertising, show promos, and weather updates.

== Conversion to 16:9 and HD ==
In mid-2013, CNNI Asia-Pacific introduced a 16:9 HD version of its feed on selected pay-TV operators. It was at this time that all Hong Kong–based shows have started airing using a 16:9 format. The SD version is still available but it is further downscaled to 4:3 letterbox on some providers.

== In mainland China ==
CNN has reported that their broadcast agreement in mainland China includes an arrangement that their signal must pass through a Chinese-controlled satellite. In this way, Chinese authorities have been able to black out CNN segments at will.

== Programmes ==
- CNN Newsroom
- New Year's Eve Live
- WorldSport
- Quest Means Business
- Connect the World with Becky Anderson
- Isa Soares Tonight
- Amanpour
- Inside Africa
- Marketplace Asia
- Marketplace Europe
- Marketplace Middle East
- African Voices
- CNN Headline Express
- CNN Freedom Project
- Anderson Cooper 360°
- The Amanpour Hour
- State of the Union
- Fareed Zakaria GPS
- Erin Burnett Outfront
- Smerconish
- The Source with Kaitlan Collins
- The Story Is with Elex Michaelson
- The Lead with Jake Tapper
- One World with Zain Asher
- Laura Coates Live
- CNN NewsNight with Abby Phillip
- CNN This Morning with Audie Cornish
- CNN Creators
- Africa Inc.
