= Boom (Thai TV channel) =

Thai television channel

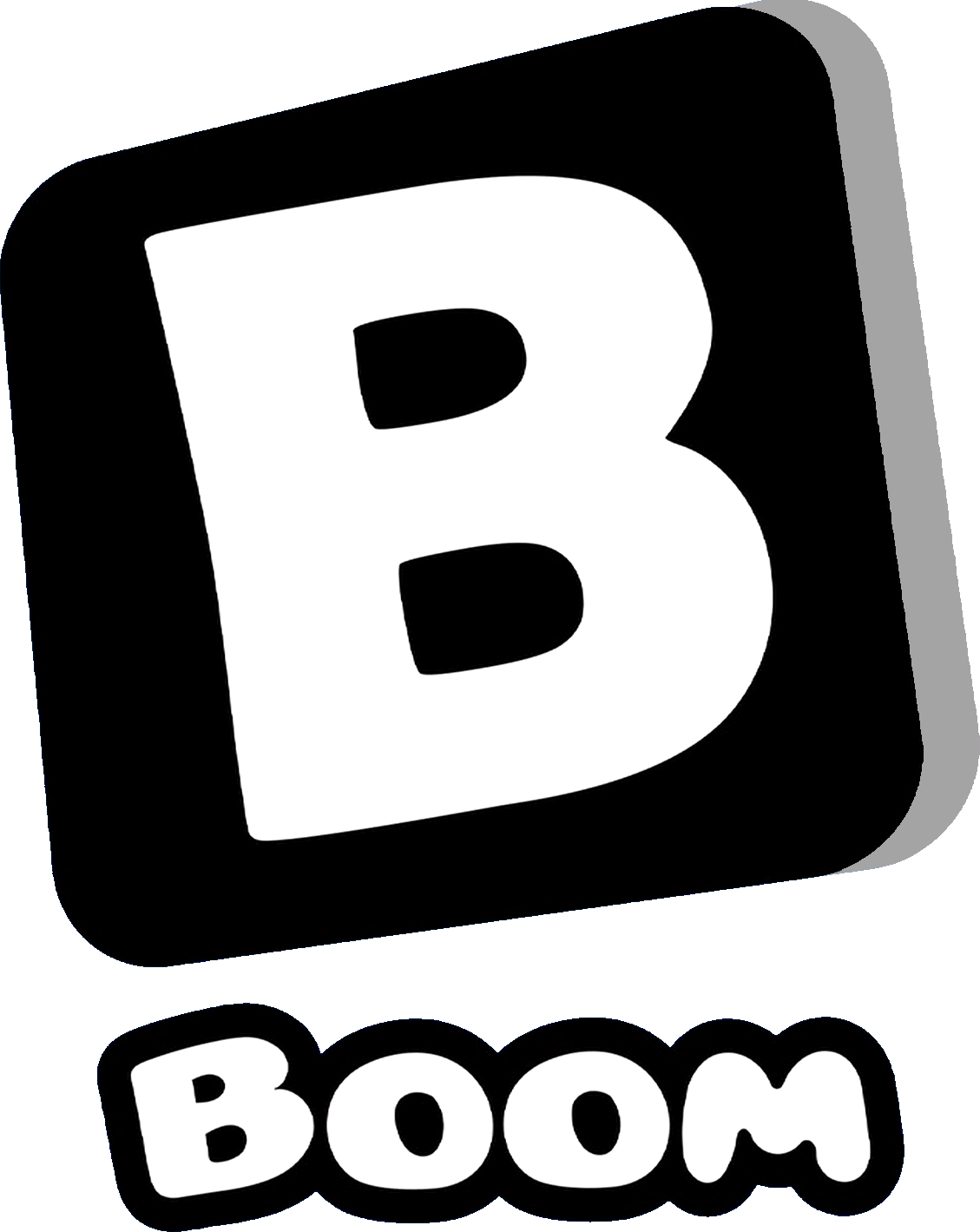
- Country: Thailand
- Headquarters: Sathorn Thani Building 1, 12th Floor, Unit 12A, Number 90/30, North Sathorn Road, Silom, Bangrak, Bangkok, Thailand 10160

Programming
- Language: Thai
- Picture format: HDTV 1080i

Ownership
- Owner: MVTV

History
- Launched: 14 August 2013; 13 years ago
- Former names: Boomerang (2013–2025)

Links
- Website: http://www.boomerangthailand.tv

Availability

Streaming media
- TrueID: TRUEID
- AIS PLAY: AISPLAY

Boom, formerly Boomerang (บูมเมอแรง) is a Thai free-to-air satellite television channel owned by MVTV. Until 27 May 2025, the channel was branded as Boomerang. The channel launched on 14 August 2013. It mainly broadcasts TV series from the Warner Bros. Discovery kids' catalogue, as well as some acquisitions.

== History ==
The channel was announced in July 2013, owned by M Turner, a joint venture between Turner Broadcasting System Asia Pacific and Major Kantana Broadcasting (51% MKB and 49% Turner), with a 14 August launch date. The channel was expected to attract a launch audience of 11 million households.

The move came after the opening of the Cartoon Network Amazone theme park, then under construction. It was expected to generate 40 million baht in revenue in its first year. By January 2015, when the local feed of Toonami launched, Boomerang had become among the five most watched satellite channels, reaching breakeven.

In 2020, it was the most watched kids channel in Thailand for the eighth year in a row.

It is unknown when M Turner handed over the operating rights to MVTV. In early August 2023, MVTV announced that it would cease the broadcast of the channel from 1 September 2023; however, when the cutoff date neared on 31 August, MVTV and Warner Bros. Discovery announced a new licensing agreement. The usual mix of programming would continue, while the Cartoonito programming was set to be added.

On 20 February 2024, MCN Global signed an agreement with Dream Express (DEX) for the provision of Asian cartoons and live-action programming, mainly from Japan, and simultaneously announced a 100 million baht investment between the parties to strengthen programming.
