= Turner Classic Movies (Asia) =

Asian TV channel

- Turner Classic Movies logo
- Country: China; India
- Broadcast area: India; Fiji; Hong Kong; Indonesia; Japan; Philippines; Singapore; South Korea; Thailand; Vietnam; Malaysia; China; Mongolia; Palau; Tuvalu; Papua New Guinea
- Headquarters: New Delhi; Singapore; Jakarta

Programming
- Language: English
- Picture format: 576i (16:9)

Ownership
- Owner: Turner Broadcasting System Asia Pacific
- Sister channels: Warner TV; TruTV; Cinemax; HBO; Boomerang; Cartoon Network; CNN International

History
- Launched: 6 October 1994; 32 years ago (as TNT); 2 April 2000; 26 years ago (as TCM)
- Closed: 2 January 2019; 7 years ago (as TCM)
- Former names: TNT (1994–2000)

Turner Classic Movies was an Asian digital classic film channel featuring commercial-free classic movies, mostly from the Turner Entertainment and Warner Bros. film libraries, which include many MGM titles. It was the Asian version of the US Turner Classic Movies and aired in the Indian subcontinent, Southeast Asia and Middle East.

After 24 years of operation, the channel was shut down on 2 January 2019.

The channel shut down alongside TruTV.

== History ==
The channel normally launched as TNT in October 1994, it was time shared with Cartoon Network. The channel was aired from 21:00 CET to 6:00 CET (from 20:00 UTC to 5:00 UTC) and IST respectively and Cartoon Network for the remaining day, mainly for analogue cable systems across Europe and India, although it was originally targeted at the Republic of Ireland, India and the United Kingdom. It was formerly free-to-air, but is now carried encrypted and provided only to cable companies and on some commercial satellite systems. It was one of the three movie channels available on Foxtel, and Austar in Australia. Turner Classic Movies and Cartoon Network became two separate channels operating in Europe and the Indian subcontinent in 1999.

On 3 April 2000, TNT was relaunched as an Asian version of Turner Classic Movies.

In Malaysia, the channel was available on Mega TV until 1 October 2001. The channel has been discontinued on Mega TV from 1 October 2001. In India, this channel was exclusively available on Dish TV until 15 March 2009. Now it is available on IN Digital Cable from the Hinduja Group and from 31 August 2009, on Tata Sky. The channel has been discontinued on Tata Sky from 15 September 2012.

On 1 July 2011, TCM's Australian and New Zealand feed began broadcasting in 16:9 widescreen.

On 12 June 2012, TCM's Asian feed began broadcasting in 16:9 widescreen.

On 13 December 2016, Australian satellite and cable provider Foxtel removed TCM from its lineup. It is believed the cause of the removal was due to the channel's repeated broadcasting of a limited catalogue of films. Ultimately, this saw TCM no longer available in Australia. Foxtel has since been criticised by its customers for its decision.

In December 2017, StarHub TV had announced that they were removing Turner Classic Movies from their service lineup at the end of the year. Meanwhile, Turner Classic Movies was only available on Singtel TV.

On 30 November 2018, Sky Network Television in New Zealand replaced the channel with their own version called Sky Movies Vintage.

On 31 December 2018, Filipino cable provider SkyCable and Singaporean cable provider Singtel ceased to provide the channel.

The channel ceased broadcasting on 2 January 2019, after which the channel space created in 1994 by TNT ceased to exist.
