= Maca & Roni =

South Korean animated television series

- Voices of: Kim Chae-ha; Lee Sang-ho; Um Sang-hyun
- Country of origin: South Korea
- Original language: Korean (season 2 onwards) None Language (Season 1 only)
- No. of seasons: 4
- No. of episodes: 179

Production
- Producer: Woo Kyung-min
- Running time: 5 minutes
- Production companies: Brick Studio, CJ ENM, ACOMMZ.

Original release
- Network: Tooniverse; KBS2; Cartoon Network; KBS1
- Release: March 22, 2021 – present

Maca & Roni (Korean: 마카앤로니) is a South Korean animated television series produced by Brick Studio (now ACCOMZ). It premiered on the cable network Tooniverse & KBS2 on March 22, 2021.

== Characters and casts ==
- Maca (마카; Korean: Kim Chae-ha): A cat-like being who is best friends with Roni. They always get into trouble together and unlike Roni, is more emotional but less adept at tasks.
- Roni (로니; Korean: Lee Sang-ho): A penguin-like being who is best friends with Maca. He is oftentimes nonchalant but does reveal empathy at times. He can do almost any task with proficiency.
- Dr. Albert (알버트 박사; Korean: Um Sang-hyun): A scientist who keeps Maca and Roni to help him in the lab. He scolds Maca and Roni whenever they make a mess. He has a girlfriend named Mari, but their dates get ruined by the titular characters.
- Albago (알바고): Albago is a robot who mostly keeps the lab tidy. Whenever Maca and Roni get into trouble, this robot oftentimes comes to help only to unintentionally join them in their chaos.

== Production and release ==
On March 10, 2021, CJ ENM's Tooniverse announced that the show will be released on March 22, 2021.

The second season was announced to air on September 22, 2022.

Season 2 marks the 2D version and the characters can now speak (only in Korean.)

The third season was announced to premier on KBS1 on October 28, 2023. It later aired on Tooniverse on January 9, 2024.

The fourth season was announced and premiered on KBS2 & aired on Tooniverse on August 12, 2026.

== Internationals ==
The series were aired on both Cartoon Network in India and Southeast Asia. but also Japan & Taiwan.

In Italy, it airs on K2 since 2024.

== Video games ==
A video game titled Maca & Roni: Jump Action Arcade (마카앤로니: 우주 최강 점프 액션) was released on August 23, 2021. A second video game titled Merge Lab (마카앤로니 : MERGE LAB) was released on February 8, 2022, developed by F3 Factory, both of these games were released on iOS and Android. but it was removed off the Google Play Store (Android) while the iOS version is still active a third video game titled: Maca and Roni Match3 LAB, published by Funkyvine on August 20, 2025, on both iOS and Android.
