= ABC Monsters =

- Logo
- Genre: Animated; Adventure
- Created by: Edmund Chan; Raye Lee
- Developed by: Animasia Studio
- Country of origin: Malaysia
- Original language: English
- No. of seasons: 1
- No. of episodes: 26

Production
- Executive producers: Edmund Chan; Raye Lee
- Running time: 22 minutes
- Production company: Animasia Studio

Original release
- Network: TV2
- Release: April 25, 2015 – October 23, 2017

ABC Monsters is a Malaysian preschool animated series created by the Malaysian-based company, Animasia Studio. The target audience is children aged 4 to 6 years old.

== Characters ==
- Alice:

Alice is an adventurous princess who loves meeting new friends and discovering interesting places. Alice enjoys solving exciting puzzles and helping out people of Capital Town, during her search of the missing ABC Monsters.

- Brian :

Brian is a happy-go-lucky boy from Capital Town and a best friend of Alice. They are always spending time together. Brian loves discovering clues and looking out for answers that will help them search where the missing ABC Monsters had been.

- Cherry Berry:

Cherry Berry is an excitable and lively little friend who accompanies Alice and Brian on their adventure. Cherry Berry keeps everyone's spirits up with her jokes and occasionally read them clues that will lead them to the missing ABC Monsters.

- King Wordy:

King Wordy is Alice's dad and he rules over Capital Town. He loves words and has always got his nose buried in a good book.

- Queen Scribble:

Queen Scribble is Alice's mom. She is a slightly maniac writer, bursting with ideas for great stories and is always scribbling down notes and ideas.

- The ABC Monsters:

A group of colorful letters within Capital Town.
