= Brand New School =

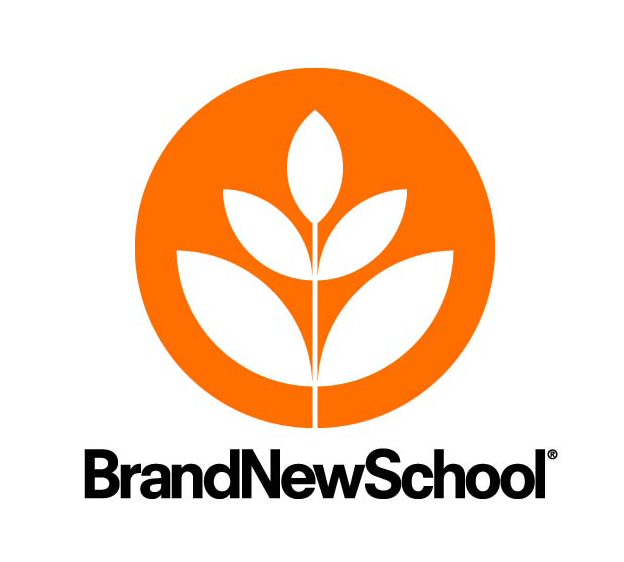
- Industry: Design, Animation, Visual effects, Post-production
- Founded: May 31, 2000
- Headquarters: New York City, USA
- Number of locations: 2
- Website: http://www.brandnewschool.com/

Brand New School is a creative design and production studio specializing in commercials, interactive media, branding consultation and design, and music videos. The company was founded by Jonathan Notaro and has offices in New York City and Los Angeles. The studio has created content for many global brands, including Coca-Cola, Apple Inc., Google, Nike, Gillette, Ford, BBC, and Starbucks, among others. The company has been recognized by AICP, Art Directors Club, D&AD, Cannes Lions, and AIGA.

== History ==
After spending time as an Art Director at Fuel/Razorfish, Jonathan Notaro broke out on his own and founded the studio in Los Angeles in 2000. The company expanded to New York shortly thereafter. Since its founding, Brand New School has created animated content, live action films, and interactive and experiential media, as well as branding and design services for brands all over the world.

The studio has created launch campaigns for products such as the Gillette Fusion ProShield razors, the OnePlus 3T smartphone, and several Google devices. Interactive and out-of-home work includes a display for Oreo in New York's Times Square and a touchscreen display in the lobby of GE headquarters in Fairfield, CT. The studio headed up the re-branding for Cartoon Network in 2010.

== Directors ==
Brand New School has a diverse roster of directors that lead the company's projects. Chris Dooley has created content for McDonald's, British Airways, Lego, and ESPN, and his music videos for the Selena Gomez tracks "A Year Without Rain" and "Naturally" have racked up over 200 million views each on Vevo. Ben Go has worked on campaigns for Honda, Samsung, and Kellogg's. Robert Bisi's work has been recognized by Cannes Lions, and he has created projects for Toyota, eBay, Corona, and Old Navy. Brumby Boylston's short film "Cruising Electric" was accepted by the Sundance Film Festival, and he has created campaigns for Taco Bell and Syfy Network. In addition to leading the company, Jonathan Notaro is an accomplished director in his own right, working on projects for Apple, Ikea, Jack Daniel's, and Ford, and receiving praise from the Art Directors Club, D&AD, Cannes Lions, the Clios, and the Type Directors Club.
