= Cartoon Network (Asia) =

Pan-Asian pay television channel

- Country: Singapore
- Broadcast area: East Asia; Southeast Asia; Bangladesh; Fiji; Maldives; Mongolia; Papua New Guinea
- Headquarters: Singapore

Programming
- Languages: English; Mandarin; Cantonese; Malay; Indonesian; Thai; Vietnamese
- Picture format: 1080i HDTV

Ownership
- Owner: Skydance Corporation
- Sister channels: Cartoon Network Philippines; Cartoon Network South Korea; Cartoonito; HBO Family; HBO; Warner TV

History
- Launched: 6 October 1994; 32 years ago
- Closed: 13 May 2023; 3 years ago (Indonesia, MNC Vision)

Availability

Terrestrial
- Nexmedia Indonesia: Channel 106
- StarHub TV Singapore: Channel 316 (HD)
- Singtel TV Singapore: Channel 226 (HD)

Cartoon Network is a pan-Asian television channel that primarily broadcasts animated series. Operated by Skydance Corporation under its International division, the channel is broadcast from its headquarters in Singapore and Jakarta, Indonesia to audiences in its country of location, as well as in Hong Kong and several areas in the Asian continent. It was launched on 6 October 1994.

== History ==
=== 1990s ===
In January 1994, it was announced that TNT and Cartoon Network would launch by the end of the year. They were originally planned to be launched as 24-hour services on the Apstar 2 satellite service. They had also planned Thai and Mandarin audio tracks for the channel.

On 6 October 1994, Turner Broadcasting System Asia Pacific launched Cartoon Network Asia on both Apstar 1 and Palapa-B2P. The channel was launched at 12:00 pm (SG/HK time). It was broadcast for fourteen hours between 6:00 a.m. to 8:00 p.m., while TNT (later Turner Classic Movies) aired on the remainder of the daily schedule and broadcast ten hours of movie programming from Turner's libraries.

During that time, Cartoon Network Asia was originally a 24-hour cable and satellite television channel devoted to cartoons and classic films called TNT and Cartoon Network Asia and the service only had four different audio tracks including English, Mandarin, Persian and Japanese. Originally devoted to classic cartoons from studios such as Warner Bros., MGM and Hanna-Barbera, Cartoon Network Asia expanded to include more contemporary programming as well as its original productions, starting with its first original series to air in Asia in 1997, Dexter's Laboratory. By the end of 1995, both TNT and Cartoon Network Asia were broadcast in 20 countries and territories across pan-Asia via satellite.

By 1998, Cartoon Network Asia had launched a separate 24-hour feed of its service on the PAS-2 satellite along with TNT Asia.

On 4 January 1999, Cartoon Network Asia began to offer Hindi-dubbed versions of its shows in addition to English, Mandarin, Cantonese, Thai, Korean, Japanese, Filipino and Malay, with dubs of shows such as Scooby-Doo, Where Are You!, The Flintstones, The Jetsons, SWAT Kats: The Radical Squadron, The Mask: Animated Series, The Addams Family, The Real Adventures of Jonny Quest, Captain Planet and the Planeteers, and other select programs.

On 22 August 1999, Cartoon Network Asia was rebranded, introducing new bumpers, new original productions and a new graphical package.

=== 2000s ===
In 2000, several non-original shows were introduced. Also, throughout the early 2000s, Cartoon Network Asia began airing several more original productions.

On 1 July 2001, Cartoon Network Asia fully became a separate 24-hour channel along with its country-specific feeds for India, the Philippines, Taiwan, Australia and New Zealand and TCM Asia. Coinciding with this, new programming blocks were introduced at night, The Cartoon Cartoon Show from 9-10pm, followed by Boomerang (later a separate television channel) from 10pm-12am.

In 2003 and 2004, more programming blocks were added. In early 2004, Boomerang was added to Foxtel with many of the older cartoons moved to the new channel. In addition, Cartoon Network showed segments of children receiving prizes during the holidays for a brief period, but these were cancelled due to low audience ratings. Up until mid 2004, Cartoon Network Asia had been tied with Disney Channel as the most popular family channel in Asian continent. The removal of the older 1950s–1980s Hanna-Barbera programming from the network during the period led to a fall in average audience share during 2004, as the fans of older cartoons moved to its new sister channel Boomerang Asia.

On 1 October 2005, the channel's bumpers were replaced with 3-D animation promotions that were set in a fictional location called "CN City". The "Cartoon Cartoons" moniker was removed in 2006. On 31 August 2008, the bumpers and ads were updated and "Cartoon Network Theatre" was renamed into "Cartoon Network Popcorn".

=== 2010s ===
On 1 October 2011, during the premiere of The Amazing World of Gumball in Asia, the channel introduced a new branding and logo originally designed by Brand New School, with a slogan "It's a Fun Thing" as well as new shows such as Oggy and the Cockroaches. In 2012, Cartoon Network started airing almost all shows in HDTV 1080i format.

The channel was rebranded into the "Dimensional" (broadcast in the U.S feed from 2016 to 2021) on 18 October 2017, along with Cinemax Asia.

=== 2020s ===
On 8 January 2022, Cartoon Network Asia, Korea, Hong Kong, and Taiwan rebranded to Redraw Your World. The video series Craft Your World launched on Cartoon Network Asia, Crayola websites and social channels during this time. The channel also held "Redraw Your World" physical events starting in February 2022, in malls across the region, including Singapore, Malaysia and the Philippines. The Indovision feed of the channel in Indonesia closed on 13 May 2023.

In May 2026, it was reported that Cartoon Network Asia would shut down in Southeast Asia on 1 November 2026, however, this claim is false.

== Availability ==
=== Mainland China ===
In Mainland China, Cartoon Network Asia has been available on a satellite since its launch on 6 October 1994. Broadcasting from Singapore in Standard Chinese and Cantonese (for South China), Cartoon Network Asia became the highest rated foreign-owned children's channel in Mainland China. It was also available on various CATV systems across Mainland China from the channel's launch on 6 October 1994, until January 2000, when it was banned for violating "relevant Chinese rules" according to an official of the SARFT. Turner officials did not receive official information at the time of the decision. At the time of banning, the channel had an estimated reach of 100,000 CATV subscribers. Several months before, the Chinese government blocked children's programming from being permitted to relay, and one media analyst said that the Cartoon Network ban was to favor local production. Despite the ban, Cartoon Network Asia remains available on various CATV systems across Mainland China including Beijing, Shanghai, Guangzhou and Shenzhen.

=== Hong Kong ===
In Hong Kong, Cartoon Network Asia is available on Now TV. It is broadcast in English, Standard Chinese and Cantonese.

=== Taiwan ===
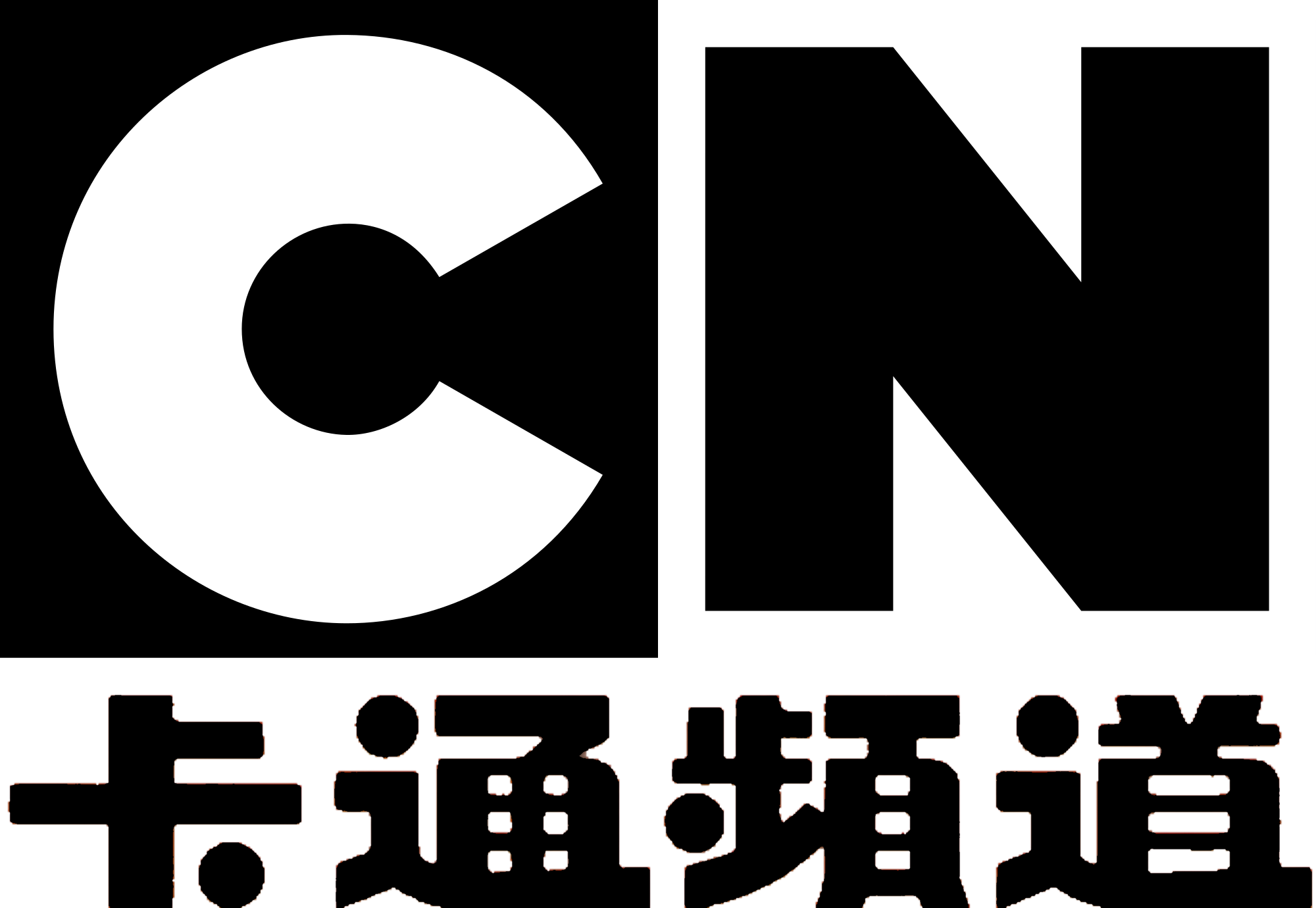
Logo of Cartoon Network Taiwan

Cartoon Network Asia has a country-specific feed for Taiwan (Chinese: 卡通頻道; pinyin: Kǎtōng píndào) that has been available on cable and satellite since its launch on 6 October 1994. It is broadcast in both Taiwanese Mandarin and English.

=== Thailand ===
In Thailand, Cartoon Network Asia is available as a part of the TrueVisions cable and satellite services; TrueVisions includes the pan-Asian Cartoon Network in both its Gold and Platinum packages.

On October 6, 1994, TNT and Cartoon Network Asia was launched on various CATV systems across Thailand along with TNT Asia.

Starting in 2009, a Thai audio track for promos and adverts was introduced alongside an official Thai website.

In February 2018, Cartoon Network Asia, along with CNN International Asia Pacific, became available on AIS Play.

=== Indonesia ===
In Indonesia, Cartoon Network Asia is available on First Media Gold and Platinum packages, Transvision Platinum Packages and the IndiKids add-on package on IndiHome.

=== Vietnam ===
In Vietnam, where it was first introduced around 1995, Cartoon Network Asia was formerly available in English, but in April 2014, a localized feed was launched. The line-up is identical to the pan-Asian version, but the promos are entirely in Vietnamese, in addition, the original programming is either dubbed or has a Vietnamese voice-over, and the local titles of the cartoons are shown on screen, right next to Cartoon Network's logo. The Vietnamese feed is available on most cable, IPTV, and streaming platforms in Vietnam. Starting in December 2016, a Vietnamese audio track for promos and adverts was introduced.

During the channel's breaks, third-party advertisements from Vietnam or promos for other channels such as Warner TV may be shown.

=== Malaysia and Brunei ===
The first Malaysian broadcasting company to air Cartoon Network Asia was Astro subsidiaries of Measat Broadcasting Systems Sdn Bhd. Cartoon Network was launched on Astro in 1996 on channel 616 in Malaysia, and in 2000 in Brunei (Kristal-Astro). In April 2020, the channel number for Cartoon Network on Astro was changed to 615 for HD.

Before Astro launched the channel in 1996, Cartoon Network Asia was first launched on Mega TV in 1995. Originally, when Cartoon Network was launched on the service, it was time shared with the Variety Channel.

On 1 August 2023, Cartoon Network was launched on Unifi TV along with HGTV.

=== Singapore ===
Singapore Cable Vision signed an agreement with Turner to carry the channels on its then-upcoming cable television service on 23 May 1995. The channel became available on 23 June, when the service launched.

=== Sri Lanka ===
Cartoon Network Asia was available in Sri Lanka. In June 2019, the Asian channel was replaced with Cartoon Network HD+ India. According to a census, the most popular Cartoon Network shows in Sri Lanka were We Bare Bears, Teen Titans Go! and The Powerpuff Girls.

Cartoon Network is available in Sri Lanka on Dialog, Peo TV and Freesat. Cartoon Network was also the first international channel to reach over ten million total viewers in Sri Lanka.

=== Maldives ===
In the Maldives, Cartoon Network Asia is available on Medianet in 2005. It is broadcast in English.

=== Pacific ===
Before Sky Pacific became a regional company, the channel was broadcast for several hours each morning on the SKY Plus subscription channel operated by Sky Fiji. In 2002, the channel became available on French Polynesian satellite television operator Tahiti Nui Satellite in order to provide an English-language service to the Cook Islands.

=== Mongolia ===
The Cartoon Network channel in Mongolia is available in English and does not air any programming blocks.

== Cartoon Network in the Philippines ==
Cartoon Network Asia has broadcast a country-specific feed for the Philippines since 1995, and has been available on cable and satellite since its launch on 6 October 1994 and airs as a separate standard-definition feed. It broadcasts in English. Cartoon Network Asia airs as its high-definition feed.

On 17 August 2025, the Cartoon Network Philippines SD feed was removed on major providers like Cignal, and began airing in the 16:9 widescreen aspect ratio format on its SD feed and returned its Cartoon Network Asia feed.

== Cartoon Network in South Korea ==
In January 2003, Cartoon Network Asia was launched in South Korea after the discontinuation of a Cartoon Network block on Tooniverse, but only in English, as Korean laws at the time stated that channels operating outside of South Korea were forbidden to carry Korean audio tracks or subtitles within South Korean territory. In 2006, JoongAng Ilbo and Turner established a joint venture to launch a separate Korean version of Cartoon Network and was launched in November 2006.

== Logo history ==
3 October 1995 – 16 August 2005

16 August 2005 – 1 October 2011

1 October 2011 – present

== Programming blocks ==
=== Current ===
==== Redraw Your Summer (Seasonal Summer) ====
Redraw Your Summer (formerly Best Summer Ever) is a Summer-themed programming block that airs Cartoon Network shows and some acquired content from May to June.

==== Shriektober (Seasonal Fall) ====
Shriektober is a Halloween-themed programming block that airs Cartoon Network shows and some acquired content.

==== So Much Christmas (Seasonal Winter) ====
So Much Christmas is a Christmas-themed programming block that airs Cartoon Network shows and some acquired content.

=== Former ===
==== Cartoonito ====
Originally launched on 1 December 2012 in Asia in conjunction with its localized website, Cartoonito's original programming block aired on Cartoon Network from 6 to 8 AM including Baby Looney Tunes and ABC Monsters. Cartoonito was replaced by Boomerang on 1 January 2015.

The brand was relaunched as a morning programming block on Cartoon Network Japan on 1 March 2022, and in Southeast Asia and Korea on 28 March 2022. It offered a modern approach to preschool programming, built to support each child's unique potential with its educational framework called "Humancentric Learning".

==== Boomerang ====
Boomerang started in Asia as a programming block on Cartoon Network Asia from 6 October 1994, to 14 March 2004. A separate television channel was launched all across the Asia-Pacific region on 14 March 2004. On 1 December 2012, it was closed and was replaced with Toonami; Toonami is also operated and distributed by Turner Broadcasting System Asia Pacific. However, on 1 January 2015, Boomerang returned to Asia and replaced Cartoonito.

==== Triple Jam ====
Triple Jam was a programming block that broadcast three Cartoon Network shows in one-hour timeslots including Teen Titans Go!, We Bare Bears and The Amazing World of Gumball on weekdays. On 2 September 2024, Triple Jam returned every weekday morning at 10am (Singapore/Malaysia) or 9am (Indonesia/Thailand), and by this time, Teen Titans Go! was replaced with Mr. Bean: The Animated Series.

==== Tiny TV ====
Tiny TV launched in Asia in June 2002. It aired cartoons targeting young children, such as The Flintstone Kids, Baby Looney Tunes, Krypto the Superdog, Tom & Jerry Kids and A Pup Named Scooby-Doo.

==== Cartoon Network Mornings ====
Cartoon Network Mornings was a morning programming block that broadcast shows from Warner Bros. Animation and some shows which aired on Cartoonito in the US and its sister channel, Boomerang, including Mush-Mush and the Mushables, Alice and Lewis, Talking Tom and Friends, Grizzy & the Lemmings and Mr. Bean: The Animated Series on weekdays.

==== FRIYAY ====
FRIYAY was a programming block that aired every Friday. It aired shows such as The Amazing World of Gumball, Craig of the Creek, Teen Titans Go! and We Bare Bears.

==== Cartoon Network Popcorn ====
Cartoon Network Popcorn was a programming block that aired movies.

==== Cartoon Network Classic ====
Cartoon Network Classic was a programming block that aired classic shows such as Courage The Cowardly Dog, Chowder, Dexter's Laboratory and others. The block ended in 2020.

==== Laughternoons ====
Laughternoons was a programming block that aired some Cartoon Network shows.

==== Good Morning Scooby! ====
Good Morning Scooby! was a programming block that aired some Scooby-Doo series including What's New Scooby Doo. The block ended in 2011.

== Era Names ==
- 6 October 1994–22 August 1999: Checkerboard Era
- 1998–2005: Powerhouse Era
- 2005–2008: City Era
- 2008–2011: New Wave Era
- 2011–2016: CHECK It Era
- 2017–2022: Dimensional Era
- 2018–2022: Mashup Era
- 2020–2022: Shape Era
- 2022–present: Redraw Your World Era

== See also ==
- Cartoon Network (U.S. channel)
  - Cartoonito
  - The Cartoon Network, Inc.
- Boomerang (Asian TV channel)
- Cartoonito (Asia)
- List of television stations in Southeast Asia
