= Exchange Student Zero =

- Created by: Shayne Armstrong; Bruce Kane; Shane Krauss (film); Maurice Argiro; Patrick Crawley (series)
- Directed by: Patrick Crawley
- Voices of: (See Voice cast)
- Theme music composer: Film: Tripod; Series: Bob Mothersbaugh Mark Mothersbaugh
- Opening theme: "Exchange Student Zero"
- Composers: Film: Tripod; Keith Moore (additional); Series: Bob Mothersbaugh
- Country of origin: Australia
- Original language: English
- No. of episodes: 13

Production
- Executive producers: Yoshiya Ayugai; Silas Hickey; Bruce Kane (series)
- Producer: Bruce Kane (film)
- Editor: Ken Hardie (series)
- Running time: 70 minutes (film); 21–22 minutes (series)
- Production companies: Fragrant Gumtree Entertainment (series); Bogan Entertainment Solutions; Cartoon Network Asia Pacific

Original release
- Network: Cartoon Network
- Release: 26 September – 19 December 2015

Exchange Student Zero is a 2012 Australian television film that premiered on 16 December 2012 on Cartoon Network, and a 2015 TV series based on the film.

== Production ==
Created by Bruce Kane with Maurice Argiro and produced by Bogan Entertainment Solutions, in association with Cartoon Network Asia Pacific, it is the first local animated production to be commissioned by the channel.

A TV series based on the film was announced as the first Cartoon Network show produced in Australia, where the two original creators joins Patrick Crawley. It premiered in the Asia-Pacific region on 26 September 2015, and the setting was changed from Perth, Australia to a U.S. town called South Port.

== Voice cast ==
=== Film (2012) ===
==== Main ====
- Dee Bradley Baker as Amonsun, Monsters
- Natalie Bond as Lucinda, Anime Girls #1
- Patrick Crawley as Biology Teacher, Real Exchange Student
- Marg Downey as Peg, Happy Peach Flower, Drama Teacher
- Scott Edgar as Principal Rogerson
- Mark Hamill as King Karuta, King Blackyard
- Edwin Kane as Leroy
- Kate McLennan as Charity, Anime Girls #2
- Rove McManus as Hiro, John, Max, Lionel, Coach
- Candi Milo as Avere, Queen Karuta, Queen Blackyard
- Peter Rowsthorn as Denmead
- Jon Von Goes as Sot Sloane

==== Additional ====
- Gene Argiro
- Ginger Argiro
- Giles Brading
- Patrick Crawley
- Shona Elliot-Kerr
- Serena Kane
- Indigo Malatt
- Molly McCusker
- Judy Whittle
- Astra Whitton

=== Series (2015) ===
- Ashleigh Ball as Charity, Peg
- Jacqueline Brennan as Queen Blackyard, Avere, Happy Peach Flower, Queen Karuta, Old Lady
- Patrick Crawley as Papa Rainbow, Zoobooninian, Doolsworth Farnstickle, Wrestler
- Scott Edgar as Principal Rogerson
- Keegan Connor Tracy as Lucinda
- Maryke Hendrikse as Ms. Dunwall
- Jessica Hopcraft as Gunk Queen
- Rove McManus as Hiro, Max, Coach Coach, Stinky
- Scott McNeil as Headmaster, Lionel, King Karuta
- Toby Moore as Principal Kipling, Announcer
- Lee Tockar as Amonsun
- Vincent Tong as John, Nephlan 1
- Sam Vincent as Denmead, Hank, Nephlan 2

== Awards ==
Writers Shayne Armstrong, Bruce Kane, and Shane Krauss won the 2013 John Hinde Award for Excellence in Science Fiction Writing for the script.

== Episodes ==
=== Television film (2012) ===
Title	Written by	Storyboarded by	Original release date
Exchange Student Zero	Bruce Kane, Shayne Armstrong, and Shane Krause; David Witt (contributing writer)	Scott Edgar, Ivan Dixon, Ben Grimshaw, and Gregory Sharp	16 December 2012

=== Series 1 (2015) ===
No.	Title	Written by	Storyboarded by	Original release date
1	"Good Old Bad Old Days"	Shayne Armstrong and S.P. Krause; Bruce Kane (story)	Charles Kenway	26 September 2015
When the principal takes the holiday a new evil principal from Zero gets in the school.
2	"Denmead for Denmead"	Bruce Kane	Ian Milne	3 October 2015
With a card, the school bully Denmead gets a new clone of himself.
3	"School Photo"	David Witt; Bruce Kane (story)	Tony Craig	10 October 2015
When it's school photo day everything is wrong so John and Max change it.
4	"Reign of Error"	Scott Edgar; Bruce Kane (story)	Charles Kenway	17 October 2015
Hiro wins a school vote and Charity is horrified.
5	"His Life as a Dog"	Bruce Kane and Scott Edgar	Charles Kenway, Ian Milne, and Patrick Crawley	24 October 2015
An Evil Wolf from Zero comes to Earth from one of the cards.
6	"Prince Harming"	Shayne Armstrong and S.P. Krause (also story with Bruce Kane)	Michael Harris and Mark Ingram	31 October 2015
The school turns upside down with the arrival of a Bishounen prince. He is strikingly beautiful, deeply troubled, self-obsessed and carries a parasol – he pretty much ticks all the boxes for Charity.
7	"See Ya Later Gladiator"	Shayne Armstrong and S.P. Krause; Bruce Kane (story)	Ian Milne	7 November 2015
During a fairytale school practice Hiro, Max and John get to a Gladiator world and must win a gladiator contest to get back at school.
8	"Amonsun Under Fire"	Tony Wilson and Scott Edgar; Bruce Kane (story)	Mark Sonntag	14 November 2015
Amonsun, fed up at Hiro abusing, tries to go on strike, but Hiro merely replaces Amonsun with Felintine, but there's more to this newbie than meets the eye.
9	"Sweet Potato"	Tony Wilson, Bruce Kane, and David Witt	Ian Milne	21 November 2015
The potato chip company has suspiciously released some inferior Battle Day Zero cards, and a giant devil baby named Sweet Potato has been spawned by a chip packet and is terrorizing the town.
10	"I'll Take the Couch"	David Witt; Bruce Kane (story)	Ian Milne and Patrick Crawley	28 November 2015
Hiro's parents suddenly pay a visit, and it happens to be on Charity's sixteenth-birthday. Things soon get out of hand.
11	"The Mystic Skater"	Bruce Kane and Scott Edgar	Mark Sonntag	5 December 2015
John tries to woo a girl by skating on Hiro's high-tech skateboard, but it becomes a matter of survival when an interdimensional competitive skateboarder arrives to cause mayhem.
12	"Dad to the Bone"	Shayne Armstrong and S.P. Krause; Bruce Kane (story)	Larry Scholl, Ian Milne, and Patrick Crawley	12 December 2015
The kids all try to spend time with their fathers, but Leroy is planning to usurp his father and Hiro has made Karuta a little too emotional. Can John and Max keep the peace?
13	"Dead Cute"	Bruce Kane, Tony Wilson, and David Witt	Charles Kenway, Ian Milne, and Patrick Crawley	19 December 2015
On Valentine's Day, Max and Denmead unwittingly set loose an adorable creature called the Malentwine that can possess girls by simply being touched, and it threatens the whole world.
