= Powerpuff Girls Z =

2006 anime television series

- 出ましたっ! パワパフガールズZ; Demashita! Pawapafu Gāruzu Zetto
- Type: TV series
- Genre: Magical girl
- Created by: Craig McCracken
- Directed by: Iku Ishiguro
- Series composition: Yoshio Urasawa
- Character designer: Miho Shimogasa
- Music by: Hiroshi Nakamura; Taichi Master
- No. of episodes: 52 (78 segments)
- Episodes

Production
- Producers: Tomoko Gushima; Kōhei Obara; Reo Kurosu; Mark Buhei
- Production companies: TV Tokyo; Toei Animation; Aniplex

Original release
- Network: TXN (TV Tokyo)
- Release: July 1, 2006 – June 30, 2007

Related
- Manga
- Written by: Shiho Komiyuno
- Published by: Shueisha
- Magazine: Ribon
- Original run: July 3, 2006 – June 2, 2007
- Volumes: 2
- Video game

Game de Demashita! Powerpuff Girls Z
- Developer: Infinity
- Publisher: Namco Bandai Games
- Genre: Party
- Platform: Nintendo DS
- Released: June 14, 2007

Powerpuff Girls Z (Japanese: 出ましたっ！パワパフガールズZ, Hepburn: Demashita! Pawapafu Gāruzu Zetto; lit. 'They're Here! Powerpuff Girls Z') is a Japanese anime television series. Planned by Cartoon Network and produced by TV Tokyo, Aniplex, and Toei Animation, the series was directed by Iku Ishiguro, with Yoshio Urasawa handling series scripts, characters designs by Miho Shimogasa, and music composed by Hiroshi Nakamura and Taichi Master. The anime is loosely based on the American animated television series The Powerpuff Girls, created by Craig McCracken and produced by Cartoon Network.

The series aired for 52 episodes on TV Tokyo between July 2006 and June 2007. In addition to Cartoon Network Japan, the anime was also broadcast on AT-X. A manga adaptation by Shiho Komiyuno ran in Shueisha's Ribon magazine between July 2006 and June 2007.

The anime's English-language adaptation was produced in association with Ocean Productions in Canada. It was broadcast on Cartoon Network in the Philippines and Boomerang in Australia and New Zealand in 2008. Despite owning the IP rights to it, the anime series never aired on Cartoon Network or its sister channel Boomerang in the United States.

== Plot ==
Professor Utonium, his son, Ken Kitazawa, and his toy dog, Peach, are busy working on Chemical X, a powerful chemical substance in fictional Tokyo City (東京CITY, Tōkyō Shitī) (New Townsville in the English dub), when Peach accidentally drops a daifuku into a vat of Chemical X, which magically transforms it into Chemical Z. Countries around the world suddenly experience weather calamity, and Ken uses a light beam ray attached to the vat of Chemical Z to blast Chemical Z on an iceberg in the Tokyo City bay, causing black-and-white rays of light to appear in the skies above it.

Three ordinary thirteen-year-old girls, Momoko Akatsutsumi, Miyako Gōtokuji, and Kaoru Matsubara, are engulfed in white light, which transforms them into Hyper Blossom, Rolling Bubbles, and Powered Buttercup, collectively known as the Powerpuff Girls Z. Peach is also engulfed in white light, transforming into a toy dog who can talk and call the girls to transform. Numerous rays of black light engulf people, animals, and objects to transform them into evil monsters who want to take over Tokyo City, such as Mojo Jojo, Fuzzy Lumpkins, Princess Himeko, Sedusa, the Gangreen Gang and the Amoeba Boys. The Powerpuff Girls Z must protect Tokyo City with the help from the Professor, Ken, Mayor Mayer and his assistant, Ms. Bellum, and use their respective weapons, including Blossom's yo-yo, Bubbles' bubble rod and Buttercup's hammer from evil monsters.

== Media ==
=== Music ===
The anime uses six pieces of theme music, two opening themes and four ending themes. In the English dub, an original song is used for the opening theme whilst the end credits used shortened versions of the six Japanese opening and ending themes. The official soundtrack was released in Japan by Aniplex on June 27, 2007. The soundtrack consists of TV size versions of most of the series theme songs, the series score by composers Taichi Master and Hiroshi Nakamura presented in the form of a party mix and character songs performed by Japanese voice actresses Emiri Katō, Nami Miyahara and Machiko Kawana who voiced the Powerpuff Girls Z. The album has a booklet that features concept art for all the characters.

Opening themes

1. "Kibō no Kakera" (希望のカケラ, Pieces of Hope) by Nana Kitade (#1–26)
2. "Jig The Upper" (ジグTHEアッパー, Jigu the Upper) by Hoi Festa (#27–52)

Ending themes

1. "Mayonaka no Doa" (真夜中のドア; Door of Midnight) by Liu Yi Fei (#1–13)
2. "Look" by Halcali (#14–26)
3. "Tōri Ame" (通り雨; Rain that Passes by) by Wiz-US (#27–39)
4. "Himawari" (ひまわり; Sunflower) by Hearts Grow (#40–52)

=== Manga ===
A manga adaptation illustrated by Shiho Komiyuno was published in Shueisha's Ribon magazine between July 3, 2006, and June 2, 2007. (Note: It finished in the magazine's July 2007 issue, released on June 2 of that same year.) Shueisha collected its chapters in two tankōbon volumes, released on June 15 and July 13, 2007.

=== Video game ===
Game de Demashita! Powerpuff Girls Z (ゲームで 出ましたっ！パワパフガールズZ, Gēmu de Demashita! Pawāpafu Gāruzu Zetto) was developed by Infinity and published by Bandai for the Nintendo DS on June 12, 2007. The game has board-game style gameplay similar to Mario Party and features Hyper Blossom, Rolling Bubbles and Powered Buttercup competing with Mojo Jojo to get to the center of the board, competing in minigames along the way.

== See also ==
- The Powerpuff Girls (2016 series)
