= Cartoonito (Asia) =

Southeast Asian TV channel

- Country: Singapore
- Broadcast area: East Asia; South East Asia; South Asia
- Headquarters: Singapore

Programming
- Languages: English; Chinese; Indonesian; Korean (Korea feed only); Malay; Thai; Vietnamese (Voice-over)
- Picture format: 1080i HDTV (downscaled to 576i/480i for the SDTV feed)

Ownership
- Owner: Skydance Corporation
- Sister channels: Cartoon Network Asia; Cartoon Network Philippines; CNN International; Cinemax Asia; HBO Asia; HLN; Warner TV

History
- Launched: 1 December 2012; 13 years ago (original); 28 July 2023; 3 years ago (relaunch); 14 November 2015; 10 years ago (South Korea)
- Replaced: Boomerang (Original)
- Closed: 1 January 2015; 11 years ago (original)

Availability

Terrestrial
- Cignal TV Philippines: Channel 76
- SatLite Philippines: Channel 80
- Sky Cable Philippines: Channel 42

Cartoonito is pan-Asian television channel that air animated series for preschoolers owned by Skydance Corporation.

The original version of Cartoonito was launched on 1 December 2012, replacing Boomerang Asia. The channel would close on 1 January 2015, with Boomerang relaunched as part of the 2015 global rebrand.

As part of Cartoonito's 2021 relaunch, the brand returned to Asia as a block on Cartoon Network and Boomerang in March and May 2022 respectively; the block shifted to Boomerang full-time in November. On 28 June 2023, Warner Bros. Discovery announced that Cartoonito would once again become its own channel, and the switchover from Boomerang took place on 28 July.

== Availability ==
=== Malaysia ===
In Malaysia, Cartoonito broadcasts via Unifi TV plus local advertisements from the service providers.

=== Philippines ===
In the Philippines, Cartoonito broadcasts as a channel and its programming came straight from the pan-Asian feed.

=== Thailand ===
In Thailand, the pan-Asian feed was launched in 2020 on 3BB Giga TV. In May 2023, Cartoonito launched on AIS Play

=== Indonesia ===
In Indonesia, Cartoonito Asia has been broadcast on Transvision (a subsidiary of CT Corp) and MaxStream TV (Telkom Indonesia). Some programs use Indonesian languages and are in English.

=== Vietnam ===
In Vietnam, Cartoonito Asia broadcasts in Vietnamese, delayed by one hour.

=== South Korea ===
A separate South Korean television channel (Korean: 카투니토; RR: katunito) launched on 14 November 2015 as Boomerang. It is owned by Warner Bros. Discovery Korea Ltd. and is located in Seoul. The channel rebranded as Cartoonito on 1 July 2024.

=== Taiwan ===
In Taiwan, Cartoonito broadcasts in Taiwanese Mandarin.

=== Oceania ===
A Cartoonito block was launched on 4 July 2022 on both Cartoon Network and Boomerang. This coincided with its Asian counterpart.
