= Cartoon Network (disambiguation) =

Cartoon Network is an international children's television programming brand originally based in the US in English.

Cartoon Network may also refer to:

== Cartoon Network feeds ==
- Cartoon Network Arabic, in Arabic
- Cartoon Network (Asia), in Indonesian, Thai, Malay, Mandarin, Cantonese, Vietnamese, Tamil, Khmer and English
- Cartoon Network (Australia and New Zealand), in English
- Cartoon Network (Brazil), in Brazilian Portuguese and English
- Cartoon Network (United Kingdom and Ireland), in English
- Cartoon Network (Canada), in English (formerly Teletoon from 1997 to 2023)
  - Boomerang (Canada), known as the original Cartoon Network from 2012 to 2023)
- Cartoon Network (Central and Eastern Europe), in Romanian, Hungarian, Czech and English
- Cartoon Network (Middle East and Africa), in Arabic, Greek and English
- Cartoon Network (France), in French and English
- Cartoon Network (Germany), in German and English
- Cartoon Network Hindi, in Hindi
- Cartoon Network (India), in English, Hindi, Tamil, Telugu, Malayalam and Kannada
  - Cartoon Network HD+, in English, Hindi, Tamil and Telugu
- Cartoon Network (Italy), in Italian and English
- Cartoon Network (Japan), in Japanese and English
- Cartoon Network (Latin America), in Latin American Spanish and English
- Cartoon Network (Pakistan), Urdu and English
- Cartoon Network (Philippines), in English
- Cartoon Network (Poland), in Polish and English
- Cartoon Network (Portugal), in European Portuguese
- Cartoon Network (Southeastern Europe), in Russian, Bulgarian, Serbian, Croatian, Slovenian and English
- Cartoon Network (Scandinavia), in Danish, Swedish, Norwegian, Finnish and English
- Cartoon Network (South Korea), in Korean
- Cartoon Network (Spain), in Castilian Spanish and English until 2013
- Cartoon Network (Turkey), in Turkish and English
- Cartoon Network (Western Europe) in English, Danish, French, Portuguese, German, Norwegian, Swedish and Dutch

== Other ==
- Cartoon Network Studios, an animation studio based in Burbank, California
- Cartoon Network Too, a British television channel
- List of international Cartoon Network channels, a list of Cartoon Network and sister-channels from around the world

== See also ==
- Cartoon Cartoons
- Cartoon Network Original Series and Movies
