= Ben 10: Ultimate Challenge =

Television game show for children

- Genre: Game show
- Based on: Ben 10 by Man of Action
- Directed by: Sasha Ransome
- Presented by: Johny Pitts
- Composer: Dobs Vye
- Country of origin: United Kingdom
- Original language: English
- No. of episodes: 12

Production
- Executive producers: Daniel Marlowe; Michael Carrington and Daniel Lennard (for Cartoon Network)
- Producers: Catherine Patterson; Mandy Morris (series producer); Rebecca Denton (for Cartoon Network); Colin Shevloff (for Cartoon Network Asia)
- Production location: London
- Running time: 30 minutes
- Production company: Twenty Twenty

Original release
- Network: Cartoon Network UK
- Release: 15 October – 31 December 2011

Ben 10: Ultimate Challenge is a game show for children themed after the Ben 10 series, developed by Turner Broadcasting System Europe in association with Twenty Twenty for various regional Cartoon Network channels. The show is running in twenty-five countries, and in seventeen countries in different languages and hosts starting from late 2011. Contestants include children between 7 and 12 years old. In 2011, twelve separate editions catering separate markets and feeds were shot at the studios in London.

In 2013, an Asian-exclusive version titled Ben 10: Ultimate Challenge Asia was produced in Malaysia by Astro Productions for Cartoon Network. The series aired only in five Southeast Asian countries – Malaysia, Singapore, Thailand, the Philippines, and Indonesia – and was hosted by Nabil Mahir.

The series had a revival as Ben 10 Challenge following the Ben 10 reboot. Ben 10 Challenge premiered on Cartoon Network UK on 13 October 2017.

== Ben 10 Challenge ==
Ben 10 Challenge is a live-action game show produced by the Spanish production company La Competencia Productions in Madrid for Turner EMEA. It follows two teams of people who compete in challenges and get tested on their Ben 10 knowledge. Versions were created for France, Germany, Italy, the Middle East, Poland, Spain, Turkey, and the UK, with the Spanish version also airing in Portugal dubbed. The English version premiered in the UK and Ireland on 13 October 2017, and in Africa on 23 December 2017.

== Ben 10: Ultimate Challenge in the world ==
Country	TV channel	Local title	Host	Release year
Argentina	Cartoon Network (Latin America)	Ben 10: Desafío Final	Sergio Figliuolo	2011
Australia	Cartoon Network (Australia)	Ben 10: Ultimate Challenge	None (only the UK version)	2011
Brazil	Cartoon Network Brazil	Ben 10: Desafío Final	Felipe Andreoli	2011
Bulgaria	Cartoon Network Bulgaria		None (only the Russian version dubbed into Bulgarian)	2011
Chile	Cartoon Network (Latin America)	Ben 10: Desafío Final	None (only the Argentinian version)	2011
Colombia	Cartoon Network (Latin America)	Ben 10: Desafío Final	None (only the Argentinian version)	2011
Denmark	Cartoon Network Denmark	Ben 10: Den Ultimative Udfordring	Simon Stenspil	2011–2012
France	Cartoon Network (France)	Ben 10: Ultimate Challenge	Terrier Luc	2011–2012
Germany	Cartoon Network (Germany)	Ben 10: Ultimate Challenge	Mitja Lafere	2011
Hungary	Cartoon Network Hungary	Ben 10: A legnagyobb kihívás	Puskás Péter	2011–2012
Italy	Cartoon Network (Italy)	Ben 10 - La sfida	Manolo Martini	2011
Mexico	Cartoon Network (Latin America)	Ben 10: Desafío Final	None (only the Argentinian version)	2011
Netherlands	Cartoon Network (Netherlands)	Ben 10: De Ultieme Uitdaging	Eric Bouwman	2011
New Zealand	Cartoon Network New Zealand	Ben 10: Ultimate Challenge	None (only the UK version)	2011
Norway	Cartoon Network Norway	Ben 10: Den Ultimate Utfordringen	None (only the Danish version dubbed into Norwegian)	2011–2012
Philippines	Cartoon Network (Philippines)	Ben 10: Ultimate Challenge	None (only the UK version)	2011
Poland	Cartoon Network (Poland)	Ben 10: Ostateczne Wyzwanie	Marcin Mroziński	2011
Romania	Cartoon Network Romania	Ben 10: Provocarea supremă	None (only the Hungarian version dubbed into Romanian)	2011–2012
Russia	Cartoon Network Russia	Бен-10: Сверхсложная задача	Anton Zorkin	2011
South Africa	Cartoon Network South Africa	Ben 10: Ultimate Challenge	None (only the UK version)	2011–2012
Spain	Boing	Desafío Ben 10	Carlos Castel	2011
Sweden	Cartoon Network Sweden	Ben 10: Den Ultimata Utmaningen	None (only the Danish version dubbed into Swedish)	2011–2012
Switzerland	Cartoon Network Switzerland	Ben 10: Ultimate Challenge	None	2011
Turkey	Cartoon Network (Turkey)	Ben 10: Zorlu Mücadele	Furkan Kizilay	2012
(United Arab Emirates) UAE (Middle East adaptation)	Cartoon Network Arabic	بن 10 التحدي الأقوى	Nour Aldin Alyousuf	2011-2016
Vietnam	Hanoi Radio Television; Ho Chi Minh City Television	Thử thách cuối cùng của Ben 10	Lê Anh; Sơn Hải; Trấn Thành	2011; 2014
