= Twenty Twenty Television =

British production company

- Type: Subsidiary
- Industry: Television production
- Founded: 1982; 44 years ago, in London
- Headquarters: London, England
- Key people: Leanne Klein (CEO)
- Products: The Choir; The Sorcerer's Apprentice; The Hoarder Next Door; That'll Teach 'Em; Brat Camp; Evacuation; Bad Lads Army; Wakey Wakey Campers
- Owner: Skydance Corporation
- Parent: Warner Bros. Television Productions UK (2007–present)
- Website: www.twentytwenty.tv

Twenty Twenty Television is a British television production company that joined the Shed Media Group (now Warner Bros. Television Productions UK) in September 2007. The company produces documentaries, current affairs, drama, living history, and children's television.

== Programming ==
Title	Years	Network	Notes
Inside the Brotherhood	1989–1991	ITV	co-production with Granada Television
The Big Story	1993–2007	ITV	co-production with Carlton Television
The Boer War	1999	Channel 4	
Second Sight	2000–2001	BBC One	
Lads' Army	2002–2006	ITV	
Thursday the 12th	2003	Bravo	co-production with Strand Productions; Unaired in the UK
That'll Teach 'Em	2003–2006	Channel 4	
Brat Camp	2005–2007	Channel 4 ABC	
Wakey Wakey Campers	2005	Channel 4	
I Know What You Ate Last Summer	2005	Channel 5	
Evacuation	2006–2008	CBBC	
The Choir	2006–2016	BBC Two	
Never Did Me Any Harm	2007	Channel 4	
The Sorcerer's Apprentice	2007–2010	CBBC	
Grandad's Back in Business	2007	BBC Two	
The World's Strictest Parents	2008–2011	BBC Three	
Ballroom High	2009	Sky One	
Gareth Malone's Extraordinary School for Boys	2010	BBC Two	
Ben 10: Ultimate Challenge	2011	Cartoon Network UK	
My Transsexual Summer	2011	Channel 4	
Show Me What You're Made Of	2011–present	CBBC	
The Hoarder Next Door	2012–2014	Channel 4	
Styled to Rock	2012	Sky Living	co-production with Fenty Films, Overbrook Entertainment and Marcy Media Films
Animal Heroes	2013	ITV	
First Dates	2013–present	Channel 4	
The Restaurant Man	2014	BBC Two	
Man Vs Weird	2014	Channel 4	
The Naked Choir	2015	BBC Two	
Gareth Malone's Great Choir Reunion	2015	BBC Two	
Gareth's Invictus Choir	2016	BBC One	
Britain's Hardest Workers: Inside the Low Wage Economy	2016	BBC Two	
Remotely Funny	2017–2018	CBBC	
The Best of British Takeaways	2017	BBC Two	
The Davina Hour	2017	W	
A House Through Time	2018–present	BBC Two	
The Big Audition	2018	ITV	
Traitors	2019	Channel 4 Netflix	co-production with 42; Previously titled 'Jerusalem'
All That Glitters: Britain's Next Jewellery Star	2021–2022	BBC Two	
Save Our Squad with David Beckham	2022	Disney+	co-production with Studio 99
Five Star Kitchen: Britain's Next Great Chef	2023–present	Channel 4 Netflix	Originally titled 'Five Star Chef'
Harry Potter: Wizards of Baking	2024–present	Food Network	co-production with Warner Horizon Unscripted Television and theoldschool
Love Con Revenge	2025	Netflix	

=== Documentaries & specials ===
- Dispatches: The War Crimes File (1995)
- Hellraisers (2000)
- Secrets of the Dead: Blood on the Altar (2002)
- The Child Who's Older Than Her Grandmother (2004)
- Torture: The Guantanamo Guidebook (2005)
- Dispatches: Supermarket Secrets (2005)
- How to Divorce Without Screwing Up Your Children (2006)
- Dispatches: How to Beat Your Kid's Asthma (2006)
- Mum's Gone Gay (2007)
- Cutting Edge: Meet the Foxes (2007)
- Child Chain Smoker (2007)
- My Boyfriend, the Sex Tourist (2007)
- Whatever It Takes (2009)
- Shanties and Sea Songs with Gareth Malone (2010)
- 50 Greatest Harry Potter Moments (2011)
- Young Nuns (2011) (co-production with Jerusalem Productions)
- Lawless (2013)
- Rich Kids Go Shopping (2016)
- Eurotrash EU Referendum Special (2016) (co-production with Rapido Television)
- Why Is Covid Killing People of Colour? (2021)

=== Current affairs ===
- What's the Story? with Vanessa Collingridge (2005, Five)
- First on Five (2005, Five)
- The Guantanamo Guidebook (2004, Channel 4)
- The Big Story with Dermot Murnaghan (1993- 1997, ITV1)

Twenty Twenty has produced the following programmes for Dispatches, Channel 4's long-running documentary series:

- Supermarket Secrets
- MMR – What They Didn't Tell You
- David Kelly – Death of a Scientist
- Bosses in the Dock
- Who Vets the Vets
- Don't Trust Me, I'm a Doctor

=== Documentaries ===
Documentaries produced by Twenty Twenty include:

2007

- Meet the Foxes (Channel 4)
- Child Chain Smoker (Channel 4)

2005

- Sex Crime Investigators (Channel 4)
- Inside the Brotherhood (Channel 4)
- Dyslexia (Channel 4)
- The Coroner (Channel 4)
- UN Blues (Channel 4)
- Stories from an African Hospital (Channel 4)
- Cutting Edge: Love Hurts (Channel 4)
- Island of Outcasts (Channel 4)
- The Turkish Connection (Channel 4)
- The Other Band of Brothers (Channel 4)
- Bitter Sweet (Channel 4)
- Navy Blues (Channel 4)

2004

- The Child Who is Older Than Her Grandmother (Five)

2003

- Sleeping with the Au-Pair (Channel 4)

2002

- Secrets of the Dead: Blood on the Altar (Channel 4)

2001

- Equinox: The Science of Trainers (Channel 4)
- Blinded (Channel 4)
- The Real: Erich Von Daniken (Channel 4)
- The Joy of Sex (Channel 4)
- Witness: Convent Girls (Channel 4)

2000

- Hellraisers (Channel 4)
- Secret History: Funny Money (Channel 4)
- Cutting Edge: The Poker Club (Channel 4)
- The Singapore Mutiny 1915 (Channel 4)
- Poisoned (Channel 4)
- The Real: Keith Moon (Channel 4)
- Abducted (Channel 4)

1995

- Deadly Experiments (Channel 4)
