= The Cartoon Network, Inc. =

American multinational media company

- Logo used since May 29, 2010
- Type: Division
- Industry: Entertainment
- Founded: March 12, 1992; 34 years ago
- Founder: Ted Turner; Betty Cohen
- Headquarters: Ted Turner Campus, 1050 Techwood Drive, Atlanta, Georgia, U.S. New York City, U.S. Burbank, California, U.S.
- Area served: Worldwide
- Key people: Michael Ouweleen (president, CEO, and COO)
- Products: Pay television; Film; Television programs; Video games; Web portal
- Brands: Boomerang; Cartoon Network; Cartoonito; Adult Swim; Toonami
- Services: Motion pictures; TV production; Cable television; Internet; Streaming service; Satellite television; Film distribution
- Owner: Skydance
- Parent: Skydance Global Cable Media
- Subsidiaries: Williams Street
- Website: www.hbomax.com/channel/cartoon-network

The Cartoon Network, Inc. (TCN) is an American multinational media company operating as a unit of Skydance through its Skydance TV division. Founded by Ted Turner and Betty Cohen and based out of Atlanta, Georgia, it operates Cartoon Network, its programming blocks Adult Swim and Toonami in addition to Boomerang.

== History ==
Logo used from March 12, 1992 to May 29, 2010

On March 25, 1986, Turner Broadcasting System acquired Metro-Goldwyn-Mayer/United Artists. On October 18, Turner forcibly sold back MGM. However, Turner kept much of the film and television library made before May 1986 (including some of the UA library) and formed Turner Entertainment Co. On October 8, 1988, its cable channel Turner Network Television was launched and gained an audience with its extensive film library. In 1991, Turner also purchased the library of animation studio Hanna-Barbera. Ted Turner selected Betty Cohen (then-Senior Vice President of TNT) to devise a network to house these programs. On February 18, 1992, Turner Broadcasting announced its plans to launch Cartoon Network as an outlet for an animation library. On March 12, 1992, The Cartoon Network, Inc. was founded one month after Turner's plan was announced. On October 1, 1992, its namesake TV channel officially launched as the first 24-hour single-genre cable channel with animation as its main theme.

In 1994, Hanna-Barbera's new division Cartoon Network Studios was founded and started production on What a Cartoon!. This show debuted in 1995, offering original animated shorts, most of which became their own programs and significantly influenced the tone of the channel. In 1996, Cartoon Network aired two preschool programs: Big Bag, a live-action/puppet television program with animated short series produced by Children's Television Workshop, and Small World, which featured animated series aimed at preschoolers imported from foreign countries. Turner Broadcasting System merged with Time Warner, which led to Warner Bros. reacquiring the animated shorts they had sold to Associated Artists Productions. The network could then continue more original productions.

The company also owns the assets of Adult Swim, a late-night programming block of Cartoon Network commonly considered to be a separate channel in itself. It launched on September 2, 2001 and remains a core property for the company.

=== Acquisition by AT&T ===
On October 22, 2016, AT&T and Time Warner disclosed an offer to merge for $108.7 billion, including assumed debt held by the latter company. The merger would bring Time Warner's various media properties, including The Cartoon Network, Inc., under the same corporate umbrella as AT&T's telecommunications holdings, including satellite provider DirecTV and IPTV/broadband provider AT&T U-verse. Time Warner shareholders approved the merger on February 15, 2017. On November 20, 2017, the U.S. Department of Justice filed a lawsuit against AT&T and Time Warner in an attempt to block the merger, citing antitrust concerns surrounding the transaction. U.S. clearance of the proposed merger—which had already received approval from European, Mexican, Chilean and Brazilian regulatory authorities—was affirmed by court ruling on June 12, 2018, after District of Columbia U.S. District Court Judge Richard J. Leon ruled in favor of AT&T, and dismissed antitrust claims asserted in the DOJ's lawsuit. The merger closed two days later on June 14, 2018, with Time Warner becoming a wholly owned subsidiary of AT&T, which renamed the unit WarnerMedia. The U.S. Court of Appeals in Washington unanimously upheld the lower court's ruling in favor of AT&T on February 26, 2019.

=== WarnerMedia-Discovery merger ===
On May 17, 2021, AT&T and Discovery, Inc. reached a definitive Reverse Morris Trust agreement, in which AT&T would spin out WarnerMedia into an independent company (unwinding the prior 2018 acquisition of the former Time Warner) that would concurrently acquire Discovery's assets, for $43 billion in cash, securities and stock plus WarnerMedia's retention of certain debt. Under the transaction, which was expected to be finalized by the second quarter of 2022, The Cartoon Network, Inc. and all other assets of WarnerMedia would be combined with the assets of Discovery, Inc. AT&T shareholders would own 71% of the company's stock and Discovery shareholders would own the remaining 29% share, with each shareholder group appointing representative board members; David Zaslav, President and CEO of Discovery, would head the new company, replacing WarnerMedia CEO Jason Kilar.

On June 1, 2021, it was announced that the merged company would be known as Warner Bros. Discovery; Zaslav explained that it would reflect "the combination of Warner Bros.' fabled hundred-year legacy of creative, authentic storytelling and taking bold risks to bring the most amazing stories to life, with Discovery’s global brand that has always stood brightly for integrity, innovation and inspiration." The merger was officially completed on April 8, 2022, with The Cartoon Network, Inc. placed under its Kids, Young Adults & Classics division. On October 11, 2022, Cartoon Network Studios was moved from Cartoon Network to sister studio Warner Bros. Animation, consolidating into the latter as a division. Hanna-Barbera Studios Europe was similarly separated from Cartoon Network due to their separate brand identities.

Turner Broadcasting System and The Cartoon Network, Inc.'s founder, Ted Turner, died at his home in Lamont, Florida, on May 6, 2026, at the age of 87.

== Global expansion ==
Cartoon Network Europe, a pan-European English feed, was launched in 1993. Spanish, Swedish, Danish, French, Italian, and Norwegian audio tracks were added in 1994. The network's Dutch feed was launched in 1997. Another feed launched in 1998, which aired in France, Italy and Spain. The pan-European feed kept airing in the other parts of Europe. The network's Italian feed became independent a few months later after the launch of the French channel, while the Spanish and French feeds were split in 1999. A Polish feed launched a year earlier, in 1998.

On September 17, 1993, some Russian cities began receiving Cartoon Network Europe through broadcasts from the Astra satellite. The channel broadcast in English. Since July 1, 1996, the channel has been available from the Panamsat 4 satellite in the territories of Southern Russia and Ukraine, in the Asian republics of the former USSR. In 1997, the channel's new distributor, Chello Zone, took over in the CIS. In the same year, the channel was partially dubbed into Russian.

In 1998, the channel began broadcasting on the territories of Belarus and Ukraine, the Baltic states and the North-West of Russia from the Astra 1G satellite. Broadcasting was 16 hours a day, from 8:00 to 0:00 MSK., at night, the channel carried Turner Classic Movies. In November 1999, the channel became available on the platform NTV Plus and other cable networks, broadcasting from the Sirius 2 satellite.

In 1999, the network's British feed officially split off from the pan-European version. This followed after the shared transponder analogue feed on Astra 1C became scrambled with VideoCrypt and the short-lived British version of TNT was launched.

A Nordic feed was launched in 2000, broadcasting in Swedish, Norwegian, Danish and English. This also became available in Iceland and Finland. The Dutch Cartoon Network closed down in 2001. It was replaced with the pan-European feed in 2001. A Dutch audio track was simultaneously added. Greek subtitles became available the same year. The Polish feed branched into separate ones for Romania and Hungary in 2002. A German feed was launched in 2006. A Turkish feed was added in 2008.

In April 2005, Cartoon Network Europe was completely dubbed into Russian.

On October 1, 2008, a separate feed of Cartoon Network was created for Hungary and Romania, while the two additional audio tracks that were previously added to Cartoon Network Poland in 2002. Czech Republic and Slovakia both used to receive this channel feed in an English-language muted audio track..

On October 1, 2009, the channel was launched – Cartoon Network Russia, broadcasting in the countries of CIS and South-Eastern Europe.

The network's Arabic feed launched in 2010, which is free-to-air on satellite and exist alongside the pan-European feed in pay-TV which would later split into another MENA feed on 1 July 2016. This is the only EMEA-marketed feed not broadcast in English. On November 17, 2010, the Dutch feed relaunched and started broadcasting 24 hours a day and with a new logo. All programs and ads air in Dutch. The Spanish feed shut down in 2013, together with the Spanish Cartoonito. This market would focus completely on the free-to-air channel Boing. The Portuguese-speaking channel was launched in October 2013 in Angola and Mozambique. It launched in Portugal later in December.

As of 2015, the ex pan-European feed still airs in the Greek part of Cyprus; it is also one of the four feeds available in the Middle East and Africa (the other ones being the Arabic, French, and Portuguese feeds). This pan-European feed broadcasts in English, while Greek subtitles are available. All other European countries had their own local or regional feed.

On September 1, 2017, the Central and Eastern European channel feed added a Czech-language audio track for its audience in the Czech Republic and Slovakia, replacing the English-language muted audio track.

== Units ==
=== Production studios ===
- CN LA Original Productions
- Williams Street

=== Television channels ===
All channels the network division

- Cartoon Network
  - Adult Swim (block)
    - Toonami (block)
- Boomerang
- Cartoonito (international only)

=== International channels ===
==== Cartoon Network ====
Region(s)	Launch date	End date	Language(s)	Coverage and availability notes
Africa	September 17, 1993 (as part of Cartoon Network Europe)		English	From Paris, France
Arab world	October 10, 2010 (as an independent concurrent feed; via free-to-air TV)		Arabic	From Dubai, United Arab Emirates
Arab world	April 1, 2016 (a Hindi language channel feed; via subscription TV)		Hindi	From Dubai, United Arab Emirates
Asia Pacific	October 6, 1994		English, Indonesian, Thai, Malay, Mandarin, Cantonese, Vietnamese, and Tamil	From Singapore and Jakarta
Asia Pacific	January 1, 1995 (Taiwan)		English, Indonesian, Thai, Malay, Mandarin, Cantonese, Vietnamese, and Tamil	From Taipei, Taiwan
Australia and New Zealand	June 30, 1995 (as part of Cartoon Network Asia)	May 13, 2025 (Australia) December 2, 2025 (New Zealand)	English	From Sydney, Australia
Australia and New Zealand	October 3, 1995 (as an independent feed)	May 13, 2025 (Australia) December 2, 2025 (New Zealand)	English	From Sydney, Australia
Australia and New Zealand	November 1, 2025 (relaunch, Australia only)		English	From Sydney, Australia
Canada	July 4, 2012 (as a sister channel of Teletoon)	March 27, 2023 (replaced by Boomerang)	English	From Toronto, Ontario, Canada. Operated under licence by Corus Entertainment.
Canada	March 27, 2023 (replacing Teletoon)		English	From Toronto, Ontario, Canada. Operated under licence by Corus Entertainment.
Central and Eastern Europe	September 30, 2002 (as part of Cartoon Network Poland)	September 18, 2024	Bulgarian, Croatian, Czech, Hungarian, Polish, Romanian, Russian, Serbian, Slovene, and English	From Prague, Czech Republic
Central and Eastern Europe	October 1, 2008 (as an independent feed)	September 18, 2024	Bulgarian, Croatian, Czech, Hungarian, Polish, Romanian, Russian, Serbian, Slovene, and English	From Prague, Czech Republic
Central and Eastern Europe	September 18, 2024 (as part of Cartoon Network CECP)		Bulgarian, Croatian, Czech, Hungarian, Polish, Romanian, Russian, Serbian, Slovene, and English	From Prague, Czech Republic
France	September 17, 1993 (as part of Cartoon Network Europe)	September 25, 2024	French and English	From Paris, France
France	August 23, 1999 (as an independent feed)	September 25, 2024	French and English	From Paris, France
France	September 25, 2024 (as part of Cartoon Network WE)		French and English	From Paris, France
Germany	September 17, 1993 (as part of Cartoon Network Europe, in English)	September 25, 2024	German and English	From Munich, Germany
Germany	September 3, 2005 (as an independent feed)	September 25, 2024	German and English	From Munich, Germany
Germany	September 26, 2024 (as part of Cartoon Network WE)		German and English	From Munich, Germany
India (South Asia)	May 1, 1995		English, Hindi, Tamil, Telugu, Malayalam, and Kannada	From Mumbai, Maharashtra, India
Israel	2000 (as part of Cartoon Network Europe, in English)		English and Hebrew	Airs as a VOD streaming channel on Yes
Israel	June 20, 2011 (as a programming block on Arutz HaYeladim)		English and Hebrew	Airs as a VOD streaming channel on Yes
Israel	2019 (as a VOD streaming channel on Yes)		English and Hebrew	Airs as a VOD streaming channel on Yes
Italy	September 17, 1993 (as part of Cartoon Network Europe)		Italian and English	From Milan and Rome, Italy
Italy	July 31, 1996 (as an independent feed)		Italian and English	From Milan and Rome, Italy
Japan	September 1, 1997		Japanese and English	From Tokyo, Japan
Middle East	September 17, 1993 (as part of Cartoon Network Europe; via pay TV)		English, Arabic, and Greek	From London, England
Middle East	July 1, 2016 (relaunched as an independent feed specific for the MENA region; via pay TV)		English, Arabic, and Greek	From London, England
Latin America	April 30, 1993		Latin American Spanish, Brazilian Portuguese, and English (translated continuity on SAP)	From Buenos Aires and São Paulo (Brazilian feed)
Latin America	October 1996 (as an autonomous Brazilian feed within the Latin American variant of the channel)		Latin American Spanish, Brazilian Portuguese, and English (translated continuity on SAP)	From Atlanta, Georgia, United States
Latin America	1999 (as an autonomous Mexican feed within the Latin American variant of the channel)		Brazilian Portuguese and English (translated continuity on SAP)	From Atlanta, Georgia, United States
South Atlantic (Latin America)	April 30, 1993 (as part of the Latin American feed)		Latin American Spanish and English (translated continuity on SAP)	From Buenos Aires, Mexico City, Medellín, Santiago and São Paulo
South Atlantic (Latin America)	2002 (as an autonomous feed within the Latin American variant of the channel)		Latin American Spanish and English (translated continuity on SAP)	From Buenos Aires, Mexico City, Medellín, Santiago and São Paulo
Pacific (Latin America)	April 30, 1993 (as part of the Latin American feed)		Latin American Spanish and English (translated continuity on SAP)	From Buenos Aires, Mexico City, Medellín, Santiago and São Paulo
Pacific (Latin America)	June 1, 2015 (as an autonomous feed within the Latin American variant of the channel)		Latin American Spanish and English (translated continuity on SAP)	From Buenos Aires, Mexico City, Medellín, Santiago and São Paulo
North Atlantic (Latin America)	April 30, 1993 (as part of the Latin American feed)		Latin American Spanish and English (translated continuity on SAP)	From Buenos Aires, Mexico City, Medellín, Santiago and São Paulo
North Atlantic (Latin America)	June 1, 2015 (as an autonomous feed within the Latin American variant of the channel)		Latin American Spanish and English (translated continuity on SAP)	From Buenos Aires, Mexico City, Medellín, Santiago and São Paulo
Netherlands	September 17, 1993 (as part of Cartoon Network Europe, in English)	September 25, 2024	Dutch and English	From Amsterdam, Netherlands
Netherlands	July 12, 1997 (as an independent feed)	September 25, 2024	Dutch and English	From Amsterdam, Netherlands
Netherlands	August 1, 2001 (as part of Cartoon Network Europe, in Dutch and English)	September 25, 2024	Dutch and English	From Amsterdam, Netherlands
Netherlands	November 17, 2010 (as an independent feed)	September 25, 2024	Dutch and English	From Amsterdam, Netherlands
Netherlands	September 25, 2024 (as part of Cartoon Network WE)		Dutch and English	From Amsterdam, Netherlands
Nordic	September 17, 1993 (as part of Cartoon Network Europe)	September 25, 2024	Danish, Norwegian, Swedish, and English	From London, England
Nordic	January 1, 2000 (as an independent feed)	September 25, 2024	Danish, Norwegian, Swedish, and English	From London, England
Nordic	September 25, 2024 (as part of Cartoon Network WE)		Danish, Norwegian, Swedish, and English	From London, England
Pakistan	May 1, 1995 (as part of Cartoon Network India)		English and Urdu	From Karachi, Pakistan
Pakistan	April 2, 2004 (as an independent feed)		English and Urdu	From Karachi, Pakistan
Philippines	October 6, 1994 (as part of Cartoon Network Asia Pacific)		English	From Singapore, Jakarta, Bangkok and Manila
Philippines	September 1, 1995 (as an independent feed)		English	From Singapore, Jakarta, Bangkok and Manila
Poland	September 17, 1993 (as part of Cartoon Network Europe, in English)	September 18, 2024	Polish and English	From Munich, Germany
Poland	June 1, 1998 (as an independent feed)	September 18, 2024	Polish and English	From Munich, Germany
Poland	September 18, 2024 (as part of Cartoon Network CECP)		Polish and English	From Munich, Germany
Portugal	September 17, 1993 (as part of Cartoon Network Europe, in English)	September 25, 2024	European Portuguese and English	From London, England
Portugal	December 3, 2013 (as an independent feed)	September 25, 2024	European Portuguese and English	From London, England
Portugal	September 25, 2024 (as part of Cartoon Network WE)		European Portuguese and English	From London, England
CIS	September 17, 1993 (Cartoon Network Europe)	September 18, 2024	Russian and English	From London, England
CIS	October 1, 2009 (Cartoon Network RSEE)	September 18, 2024	Russian, Bulgarian, and English	From Munich, Germany
CIS	September 18, 2024 (as part of Cartoon Network CECP)		Russian, Bulgarian, and English	From Munich, Germany
Southeastern Europe	October 1, 2009	September 18, 2024	Russian, Bulgarian, Croatian, Serbian, Slovene, and English	From Munich, Germany
Southeastern Europe	November 5, 2021 (launched in Croatian, Serbian, Slovene)	September 18, 2024	Russian, Bulgarian, Croatian, Serbian, Slovene, and English	From Munich, Germany
Southeastern Europe	September 18, 2024 (as part of Cartoon Network CECP)		Russian, Bulgarian, Croatian, Serbian, Slovene, and English	From Munich, Germany
South Korea	November 11, 2006		Korean and English	From Seoul, South Korea
Spain	March 4, 1994 (as part of Cartoon Network Europe)	July 1, 2013 (as a channel)	European Spanish and English (in rare times Catalan)	From London, England
Spain	August 23, 1999 (as an independent feed)	July 1, 2013 (as a channel)	European Spanish and English (in rare times Catalan)	From London, England
Spain	September 3, 2013 (as a weekend afternoon block on Boing)		European Spanish and English (in rare times Catalan)	From London, England
Turkey	January 28, 2008		Turkish and English	From Istanbul, Turkey
UK, Ireland & Malta	September 17, 1993		English	From London, England

==== Adult Swim ====
Channel name	Launch date	End date	Coverage and availability notes
Australia & New Zealand	December 2005 (original)	December 31, 2007 (original)	Available as a block on Cartoon Network (Australia).
Australia & New Zealand	January 9, 2016 (relaunch)	November 2019 (relaunch)	Available as a block on Cartoon Network (Australia).
Canada	July 4, 2012 (as a block on Cartoon Network)	March 3, 2019 (as a block on Cartoon Network (now Boomerang))	Canadian block operated under licence by Corus Entertainment
Canada	April 1, 2019 (as channel, replaced Action)		Canadian channel (24/7) operated by Corus Entertainment; successor to Teletoon at Night, and formerly under the Showcase brand.
France	March 4, 2011 (as a block on Cartoon Network Switzerland)	2015 (as a block on Cartoon Network Switzerland)	Available as programming and in SVOD with Warner TV Next, and selected programming on Max.
France	July 24, 2019 (as a block on Warner TV Next)		Available as programming and in SVOD with Warner TV Next, and selected programming on Max.
Germany	January 28, 2009 (as a block on TNT Serie)	2017 (as a block on TNT Serie)	Available as a block on WarnerTV Comedy.
Germany	2016 (as a block on TNT Comedy)		Available as a block on WarnerTV Comedy.
Latin America	October 7, 2005 (as a block on Cartoon Network)	2008 (as a block on Cartoon Network)	
Latin America	November 19, 2007 (as a block on I.Sat)	April 16, 2020 (as a block on I.Sat)	
Latin America	November 3, 2014 (as a block on TBS)	2020 (as a block on TBS)	
Latin America	May 2, 2020 (as a block on Warner TV)	November 8, 2021 (as a block on Warner TV)	
Latin America	October 31, 2023 (as a TV channel)		
Russia	April 1, 2007	2021	Available as a block in Russia on 2x2 channel.
Spain	May 5, 2007 (as a block on TNT)	2012 (as a block on TNT)	
Spain	January 22, 2020 (as part of HBO, now HBO Max)		
Spain	December 3, 2020 (as a premium pack with Toonami on Orange TV)		
UK & Ireland	July 8, 2006 (as a block on Bravo)	July 7, 2008 (as a block on Bravo)	Available as a block on E4.
UK & Ireland	June 5, 2010 (as a block on FX/Fox)	September 1, 2017 (as a block on FX/Fox)	Available as a block on E4.
UK & Ireland	January 4, 2012 (as a block on TCM)	August 2013 (as a block on TCM)	Available as a block on E4.
UK & Ireland	November 2016 (as a block on TruTV)	December 2016 (as a block on TruTV)	Available as a block on E4.
UK & Ireland	February 15, 2019 (as a block on E4)	October 13, 2025 (as a block on E4)	Available as a block on E4.

==== Boomerang ====
Region(s)	Launch date	End date	Language(s)	Coverage and availability notes
Australia	October 3, 1995 (block on Cartoon Network Australia and New Zealand)	March 13, 2004 (block on Cartoon Network Australia and New Zealand)	English	From Sydney, Australia
Australia	March 14, 2004 (TV channel)	May 13, 2025 (TV channel)	English	From Sydney, Australia
Canada	March 27, 2023 (rebranding the first Cartoon Network as a Boomerang channel)		English	From Toronto, Ontario. Owned by Corus Entertainment.
Central and Eastern Europe	June 5, 2005 (as part of Boomerang Europe)	March 9, 2022 (Russia) and March 18, 2023 (in whole CEE); replaced by Cartoonito	English, Polish, Romanian, Hungarian, Russian, Bulgarian, Dutch, Czech, and German	From Munich, Germany
Central and Eastern Europe	October 11, 2011 (split into an independent feed)	March 9, 2022 (Russia) and March 18, 2023 (in whole CEE); replaced by Cartoonito	English, Polish, Romanian, Hungarian, Russian, Bulgarian, Dutch, Czech, and German	From Munich, Germany
France	April 23, 2003		French and English	From Paris, France
Germany	June 1, 2006	October 1, 2018 (closed down and replaced by Boomerang Central and Eastern Europe)	German and English	From Munich, Germany
India (South Asia)	September 5, 2005 (block on Cartoon Network India)	May 2009	English and Hindi	From Mumbai, India
Italy	July 31, 2003		Italian and English	From Rome, Italy
Japan	January 2018	March 31, 2022	Japanese	From Tokyo, Japan
Latin America	July 2, 2001 (channel)	December 1, 2021 (channel); replaced by Cartoonito	Spanish, English, and Portuguese	From Buenos Aires, Argentina; Santiago, Chile; São Paulo, Brazil; and Mexico City, Mexico
Middle East and Africa	March 2005 (as part of Boomerang Europe)	March 25, 2023 (Africa) and September 4, 2023 (MENA); replaced by Cartoonito	English, Arabic, and Greek	From Paris, France
Middle East and Africa	July 1, 2016 (MENA independent feed)	March 25, 2023 (Africa) and September 4, 2023 (MENA); replaced by Cartoonito	English, Arabic, and Greek	From London, England
Netherlands	October 10, 2005	2017 (replaced again by Boomerang Central and Eastern Europe)	Dutch and English	From London, England
Netherlands	2015 (independent feed)	2017 (replaced again by Boomerang Central and Eastern Europe)	Dutch and English	From London, England
Nordic	September 15, 2009 (as a block)	September 30, 2010 (as a block)	English, Danish, Norwegian, and Swedish	From London, England
Nordic	September 30, 2010 (as a channel)	September 4, 2023 (as a channel); replaced by Cartoonito	English, Danish, Norwegian, and Swedish	From London, England
Portugal	April 21, 2015	March 23, 2023; replaced by Cartoonito	Portuguese and English	From Lisbon, Portugal
South Korea	November 14, 2015	June 30, 2024; replaced by Cartoonito	Korean and English	From Seoul, South Korea
Southeast Asia	September 5, 2005 (original)	December 1, 2012 (original)	English and Mandarin	From Singapore
Southeast Asia	January 1, 2015 (relaunch)	July 28, 2023 (relaunch); replaced by Cartoonito	English and Mandarin	From Singapore
Spain	December 1, 2004	September 1, 2011; replaced by Cartoonito	Spanish and English	From London, England
Thailand	August 14, 2013	May 27, 2025	Thai	From Bangkok, Thailand
Turkey	April 23, 2016 (as a channel)	December 3, 2018 (as a block on Cartoon Network)	Turkish and English	From Istanbul, Turkey
Turkey	April 23, 2018 (as a block on Cartoon Network)	September 4, 2023; replaced by Cartoonito	Turkish and English	From Istanbul, Turkey
UK, Ireland & Malta	May 27, 2000		English	From London, England

==== Cartoonito ====
Region(s)	Launch date	End date	Language(s)	Type	Coverage and availability notes
Arab world	September 4, 2011 (original block)	April 1, 2014 (original block)	Arabic	Block on Cartoon Network	From Dubai, United Arab Emirates
Arab world	March 24, 2019 (reblock)	February 7, 2022 (reblock)	Arabic	Block on Cartoon Network	From Dubai, United Arab Emirates
Arab world	February 7, 2022 (relaunch)		Arabic	Block on Cartoon Network	From Dubai, United Arab Emirates
Asia Pacific	December 1, 2012 (channel, original)	January 1, 2015 (channel, original)	English and Chinese	Channel (2012–2015)	From Singapore and Jakarta, replaced Boomerang Asia
Asia Pacific	March 28, 2022 (Cartoon Network block)	November 21, 2022 (Cartoon Network block)	English and Chinese	Block on Cartoon Network (2022)	From Singapore and Jakarta, replaced Boomerang Asia
Asia Pacific	May 2, 2022 (Boomerang block)	July 28, 2023 (Boomerang block)	English and Chinese	Block on Boomerang (2022–2023)	From Singapore and Jakarta, replaced Boomerang Asia
Asia Pacific	July 28, 2023 (channel, relaunch)		English and Chinese	Channel (2023–present)	From Singapore and Jakarta, replaced Boomerang Asia
Australia & New Zealand	June 27, 2022	May 13, 2025 (Australia only)	English	Block on Cartoon Network	From Sydney, Australia
Central and Eastern Europe	October 12, 2011 (original block)	January 1, 2014 (original block)	English, German, Polish, Romanian, Serbian, Croatian, Slovene, Hungarian, Russian, Dutch, and Bulgarian	Block on Boomerang CEE (2011–2014)	From Munich, Germany, replaced Boomerang CEE
Central and Eastern Europe	September 1, 2022 (relaunched block)	March 18, 2023 (relaunched block)	English, German, Polish, Romanian, Serbian, Croatian, Slovene, Hungarian, Russian, Dutch, and Bulgarian	Block on Boomerang CEE (2022–2023)	From Munich, Germany, replaced Boomerang CEE
Central and Eastern Europe	March 18, 2023 (channel)		English, German, Polish, Romanian, Serbian, Croatian, Slovene, Hungarian, Russian, Dutch, and Bulgarian	Channel (2023–present)	From Munich, Germany, replaced Boomerang CEE
France	September 5, 2011 (original block)	July 5, 2013 (original block)	French	Block on Boing (2011–2013)	From Neuilly-sur-Seine, France
France	April 3, 2023 (channel)		French	Channel (2023–present)	From Neuilly-sur-Seine, France
India (South Asia)	August 7, 2013		Hindi, Tamil, and Telugu	Block on Cartoon Network	From Mumbai, Maharashtra, India
Italy	August 22, 2011		Italian	Channel	From Rome, Italy; owned by Boing S.p.A. (joint-venture between Mediaset (51%) and Warner Bros. Discovery EMEA (49%))
Japan	March 1, 2022		Japanese and English	Block on Cartoon Network	From Tokyo, Japan
Latin America	December 1, 2021		Spanish, English, and Portuguese	Channel	From Buenos Aires, Argentina, replaced Boomerang Latin America
Middle East and Africa	October 12, 2011 (original block)	January 1, 2014 (original block)	English, Arabic, and Greek	Block on Boomerang (2011–2014)	From London, England
Middle East and Africa	April 4, 2022 (relaunch block)	March 25, 2023 (relaunch Africa block) September 4, 2023 (relaunch MENA block)	English, Arabic, and Greek	Block on Boomerang (2022–2023)	From London, England
Middle East and Africa	March 25, 2023 (Africa channel) September 4, 2023 (MENA channel)		English, Arabic, and Greek	Channel (2023–present)	From London, England
Nordic	February 1, 2022 (block)	September 4, 2023 (block)	Danish, Norwegian, Swedish, and English	Block on Boomerang (2022–2023)	From London, England; replaced Boomerang Nordic
Nordic	September 4, 2023 (channel)	September 11, 2024	Danish, Norwegian, Swedish, and English	Channel (2023–present)	From London, England; replaced Boomerang Nordic
Nordic	September 11, 2024 (as part of Cartoonito Western Europe)				
Philippines	December 1, 2012 (channel)	January 1, 2015 (channel)	English	Channel (2012–2015)	From Singapore, Jakarta, Bangkok, Manila
Philippines	March 28, 2022 (block)		English	Block on Cartoon Network (2022–present)	From Singapore, Jakarta, Bangkok, Manila
Portugal	February 21, 2022 (block)	March 23, 2023 (block)	Portuguese and English	Block on Boomerang (2022–2023)	From Lisbon, Portugal; replaced Boomerang Portugal
Portugal	March 23, 2023 (channel)	September 11, 2024 (merged)	Portuguese and English	Channel (2023–present)	From Lisbon, Portugal; replaced Boomerang Portugal
Portugal	September 11, 2024 (as part of Cartoonito Western Europe)				
South Korea	March 28, 2022 (block)	June 30, 2024 (block)	Korean and English	Block on Boomerang (2022–2024)	From Seoul, South Korea; replaced Boomerang South Korea
South Korea	July 1, 2024 (channel)		Korean and English	Channel (2024–present)	From Seoul, South Korea; replaced Boomerang South Korea
Spain	September 1, 2011	June 30, 2013	Spanish and English	Channel	From London, England
Turkey	December 3, 2018 (Cartoon Network block)		Turkish and English	Block on Cartoon Network (2018–present)	From Istanbul, Turkey; replaced Boomerang Turkey
Turkey	September 5, 2022 (Boomerang block)	September 4, 2023 (Boomerang block)	Turkish and English	Block on Boomerang (2022–2023)	From Istanbul, Turkey; replaced Boomerang Turkey
Turkey	September 4, 2023 (channel)		Turkish and English	Channel (2023–present)	From Istanbul, Turkey; replaced Boomerang Turkey
UK, Ireland & Malta	September 4, 2006 (original block)	May 23, 2007 (original block)	English	Block on Cartoon Network Too (2006–2007)	From London, England
UK, Ireland & Malta	May 24, 2007 (channel)		English	Channel (2007–present); Block on Boomerang (2009–2010)	From London, England
UK, Ireland & Malta	March 1, 2022 (relaunch block)		English	Block on Cartoon Network (2022–present)	From London, England

==== Toonami ====
Region(s)	Launch date	End date	Language(s)	Type	Coverage and availability notes
Africa	June 1, 2017		English	Channel	From Paris
Asia Pacific	December 1, 2012	March 31, 2018	English, Thai, Mandarin, Vietnamese, Indonesian, and Malay	Channel	From Singapore
Australia and New Zealand	July 7, 2001	August 4, 2006	English	Block on Cartoon Network	Aired on Saturday evenings and Sunday afternoons. It later expanded to airing on weekday afternoons.
Central Europe	November 4, 2002	September 2, 2006	Polish, Hungarian, and Romanian	Block	Aired as a weeknight and weekend morning block.
France	February 11, 2016	September 4, 2023; replaced by Warner TV Next	French	Channel	From Paris, France
India (South Asia)	2005 (block)	May 18, 2018	English and Hindi	Channel	Launched in 2015, it formerly aired action-animated and anime programming, before shifting its focus to airing classic animated series in 2017, similar to Boomerang. It ceased broadcasting in 2018.
India (South Asia)	February 26, 2015 (channel)	May 18, 2018	English and Hindi	Channel	Launched in 2015, it formerly aired action-animated and anime programming, before shifting its focus to airing classic animated series in 2017, similar to Boomerang. It ceased broadcasting in 2018.
Latin America	December 2, 2002 (original block)	March 26, 2007 (original block)	Spanish and Portuguese	Block on Cartoon Network and Adult Swim	It was later relaunched as "Toonami Powered by Crunchyroll" as part of a partnership with Crunchyroll from 2020–2022.
Latin America	August 31, 2020 (First relaunch)	August 30, 2022 (First relaunch)	Spanish and Portuguese	Block on Cartoon Network and Adult Swim	It was later relaunched as "Toonami Powered by Crunchyroll" as part of a partnership with Crunchyroll from 2020–2022.
Latin America	2023 (Second relaunch)		Spanish and Portuguese	Block on Cartoon Network and Adult Swim	It was later relaunched as "Toonami Powered by Crunchyroll" as part of a partnership with Crunchyroll from 2020–2022.
UK, Ireland & Malta	September 8, 2003	May 24, 2007	English	Channel	Replaced CNX; From London, England

==== Other channels ====
Channel name	Launch date	End date	Availability	Notes
Boomerang +1	March 6, 2006		United Kingdom	One-hour timeshift service to Boomerang.
Boomerang +1	October 22, 2007	December 31, 2025	Italy	One-hour timeshift service to Boomerang.
Boomerang +1	February 23, 2010		France	One-hour timeshift service to Boomerang.
Cartoon Network +1	December 19, 1998 (original)	March 6, 2006 (original)	United Kingdom	One-hour timeshift service to Cartoon Network. The original network was replaced with Boomerang +1. Re-launched version replaced Cartoon Network Too.
Cartoon Network +1	April 1, 2014 (relaunch)		United Kingdom	One-hour timeshift service to Cartoon Network. The original network was replaced with Boomerang +1. Re-launched version replaced Cartoon Network Too.
Cartoon Network +1	July 31, 2003		Italy	One-hour timeshift service to Cartoon Network. The original network was replaced with Boomerang +1. Re-launched version replaced Cartoon Network Too.
Cartoon Network HD+	May 18, 2018		India, Sri Lanka, Pakistan, and Bangladesh	The channel is a sister channel of Cartoon Network India, that mostly airs new shows. The channel is an HD-only channel broadcast in South Asia.
Cartoon Network Too	April 24, 2006	April 1, 2014	United Kingdom	Sister channel to Cartoon Network, originally launched as a service that timeshared with TCM 2. Relaunched as part of a merger with Toonami, with original slot being replaced with Cartoonito and re-replaced by Cartoon Network +1.
CNX	October 14, 2002	September 8, 2003	United Kingdom	General Entertainment network that aired mostly action cartoons during the day and more-adult-oriented shows during the evening. Replaced by Toonami
Tooncast	December 1, 2008		Latin America	Sister channel that airs classic cartoons.

Note: In Italy and the UK, the network's "+1" timeshift channels are often temporarily rebranded and carry only one franchise for around a month, such as Looney Tunes, Tom and Jerry, and Ben 10.

== See also ==
- Nickelodeon Group
- Discovery Kids
- Pogo
- Boing
