= Cartoonito (Middle East and Africa) =

Middle Eastern children's television channel

- Broadcast area: MENA; Sub-Saharan Africa; Greece; Cyprus; Turkey
- Headquarters: London, United Kingdom

Programming
- Languages: English (MENA and Africa feeds); Arabic (MENA feed only); Greek (MENA feed only, continuity and bumpers in English); Turkish (MENA feed only)
- Picture format: 16:9 (576i, SDTV) (Africa feed); 16:9 (1080i, HDTV) (downgraded to 16:9 576i for SDTVs; MENA feed)

Ownership
- Owner: Skydance Corporation
- Sister channels: List: Cartoon Network TNT Africa CNN International Cartoon Network Arabic Cartoon Network Hindi Boing Discovery Channel Investigation Discovery Real Time TLC Food Network Travel Channel

History
- Launched: 12 October 2011; 15 years ago (as a block); 1 July 2016; 10 years ago (as independent channel feeds)
- Former names: Boomerang (2016–2023)

Availability

Terrestrial
- DStv: Channel 302 (Cartoonito Africa)
- Azam TV (East Africa): Channel 227 (Cartoonito Africa)
- GOtv: Channel 90 (Cartoonito Africa)
- beIN: Channel 610 (Cartoonito MENA)
- D-Smart: Channel 122 (HD; Turkish language)
- Tivibu: Channel 118 (HD; Turkish language)
- Digiturk: Channel 168 (HD; Turkish language)
- Turkcell TV+: Channel 123 (HD; Turkish language)

Cartoonito is a Middle Eastern pay television children's channel broadcast in the Middle East, Greece, Cyprus, Turkey and North and Sub-Saharan Africa. It originally launched as a programming block on 12 October 2011, before it launched independent channel feeds on 1 July 2016, and replaced Boomerang in some markets in 2023. The channel is part of the Cartoonito brand owned by Skydance Corporation and its EMEA arm.

== History ==
=== As part of Boomerang ===
On 12 October 2011, a dedicated Central and Eastern European feed was launched, serving Poland, Hungary, and Romania and featuring audio tracks for each respective country along with English. Preschool brand Cartoonito joined both feeds as a morning and afternoon block. Despite the split, Boomerang continued to air in several European countries (such as Portugal and the Netherlands) until 2015.

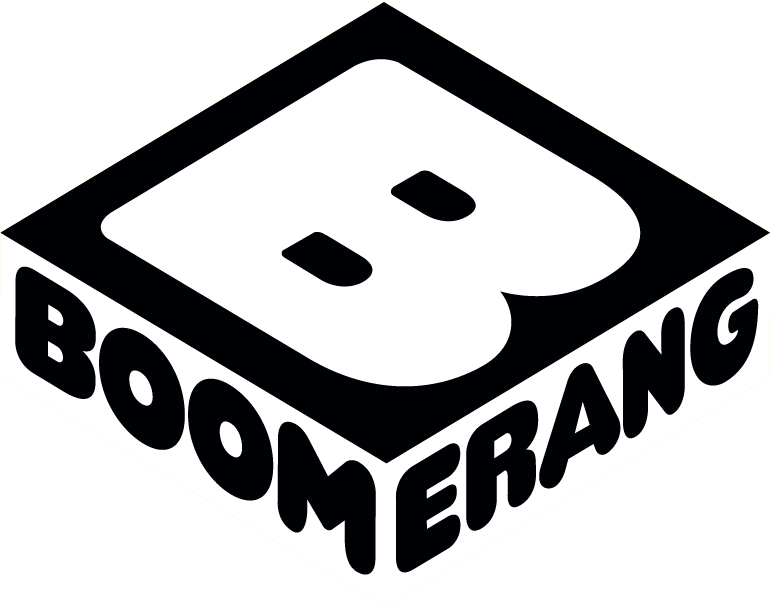
Boomerang logo, 2015–2023

On 14 January 2015, the channel adopted the global rebrand and renamed itself as Boomerang Africa. On 1 July 2016, Boomerang MENA – an official feed for the Arab world, launched to replace the African feed on the region's TV providers, as well as in Greece and Cyprus. The HD channel carries a separate schedule and set of censorship rules, with three audio tracks: English, Arabic, and Greek. Boomerang Africa switched to 16:9 widescreen on 21 September 2016. On 4 March 2019, it began broadcasting in HD.

On 3 December 2018, Cartoonito launched as an afternoon block on Cartoon Network Turkey, airing every day from 12:00 noon to 3:30 PM local time. However, as part of its global re-introduction, a Cartoonito block also arrived on Boomerang on 5 September 2022.

=== As Cartoonito ===
In Africa, Cartoonito was launched as a daily morning (formerly morning and afternoon) block beginning on 12 October 2011. The original block ended on 1 January 2014, but later returned on 4 April 2022, as part of the May 2021 relaunch. On 8 February 2023, it was announced that Cartoonito would expand into a full-time channel in Boomerang's place on 25 March.

On 22 June 2023, the broadcasters announced that Boomerang in the MENA would rebrand to Cartoonito on 4 September 2023, along with its Turkey and Nordic counterpart.

On 9 October 2024, the Turkish feed merged into the MENA as part of Warner Bros. Discovery's cut-cost strategy. However, the DOG and the Turkish advertising and age rating remain unchanged.

In November 2025, it was reported that Cartoonito alongside the company's 11 other TV channels might be exiting DStv and GOtv due to a carriage dispute with MultiChoice.

== Sister channels ==
=== Cartoon Network ===
Cartoon Network is a television channel offering animation ranging from action to comedy for children aged 7–14.

=== Boing ===
Boing is a television channel that airs repeats of programs formerly seen on Cartoon Network and Boomerang. It launched on 30 May 2015, as the fourth extension of Turner's larger Boing brand.

=== Toonami ===
Toonami is a television channel catered towards young adults consisting of DC animation from Batman, Superman and Young Justice. It launched in 2017 on Kwesé TV until the platform went defunct in 2019. Then, it was made available on Cell C's defunct streaming service Black for that same year.

In March 2020, the channel was revived as a 2 month pop-up channel on DStv and GOtv thereafter it was made available full-time on the StarTimes platform after its closure. As of March 2021, Toonami can also be found on Canal+, Intelvision, Azam TV and Zuku TV.

== See also ==
- Cartoonito
- List of international Cartoon Network channels
- List of programs broadcast by Cartoonito
