= Wakey Wakey (disambiguation) =

Wakey Wakey is an album by punk band Toy Dolls.

Wakey Wakey may also refer to:

- Wakey Wakey (band), an adult alternative pop group based in Brooklyn, New York.
- Wakey! Wakey!, a GMTV program
- Wakey Wakey Campers, a British reality television game show series
- Wakey! Wakey!, a CITV show
- Wakey Wakey..., a teaser trailer released by the Don't Hug Me I'm Scared channel
- Wakey-Wakey, a Japanese album by NCT 127
