= Love Con Revenge =

American docuseries

- Genre: Documentary
- Directed by: James O'Reilly
- Starring: Cecilie Fjellhøy

Production
- Production company: Twenty Twenty Television

Original release
- Network: Netflix
- Release: September 5, 2025

Love Con Revenge is a six-part docuseries that premiered on Netflix in September 2025.

== Premise ==
Love Con Revenge follows Cecilie Fjellhøy, one of the original victims of Simon Leviev who would become known as The Tinder Swindler. The series follows Fjellhøy and a private investigator as they gather evidence against others similar to Leviev.

== Release ==
Love Con Revenge was released as a six-episode series on Netflix on September 5, 2025.

== Reception ==
The series holds an average rating of 83% on Rotten Tomatoes, based on five positive (“fresh”) critic reviews and one negative (“rotten”) review. Reality Blurred wrote that, "The series has things it wants to do: letting victims testify, telling them they aren’t crazy or stupid, and legally pantsing the men who made them feel that way. And it does those things, and it learns how to make those things watchable along the way. It’s more than I can say for a lot of shows." The Decider gave the series a "Stream It" rating. The Guardian wrote that, "what could perhaps have made four relatively punchy hour-long episodes or six half hours grows repetitive and loses power over time." Our Culture Mag wrote, "The docuseries isn’t perfect. Editing is shoddy, and some moments feel scripted."
