= The Tinder Swindler =

British true crime documentary

- Poster
- Directed by: Felicity Morris
- Written by: Felicity Morris
- Produced by: Bernadette Higgins
- Cinematography: Edgar Dubrovskiy
- Edited by: Julian Hart
- Music by: Jessica Jones
- Production companies: Raw TV; AGC Studios; Gaspin Media
- Distributed by: Netflix
- Release date: 2 February 2022
- Running time: 114 minutes
- Country: United Kingdom
- Language: English (Note: With some dialogue in Hebrew and Norwegian)

The Tinder Swindler is a British true crime documentary film directed by Felicity Morris and released on streaming on Netflix on 2 February 2022. The documentary tells the story of the Israeli conman Simon Leviev (born Shimon Hayut) who used the dating app Tinder to connect with individuals whom he then emotionally manipulated into financially supporting his lavish lifestyle on the pretext he needed the money to escape his "enemies".

== Plot and background ==
An Israeli man, born Shimon Hayut, travelled around Europe, presenting himself as the son of Israeli diamond mogul Lev Leviev. He used the dating app Tinder to contact women and trick them into lending him money that he would never repay. He charmed women with lavish gifts and took them to dinners on private jets using money he obtained from other women he had previously conned. He would later pretend he was being targeted by his "enemies", often sending the same messages and images to each woman, indicating that he had just been attacked with a knife, but that his bodyguard had saved him and was hurt. He then asked his victims to help him financially due to the breach of 'security', supposedly hindering his use of his credit cards and bank accounts; the women often took out bank loans and new credit cards in order to help. He then used the money gained through the deception to lure new victims, while essentially operating a Ponzi scheme. Later, he would pretend to repay his victims by sending forged documents showing fake bank transfers and then break off contact with the victims. Sometimes he went as far as threaten and use manipulation to get more money from his victims. It is estimated that he swindled $10 million from people across the world.

== Production ==
The Tinder Swindler was written and directed by Felicity Morris.

Original music was by English composer Jessica Jones, for which she was nominated for an Emmy Award for Outstanding Music Composition for a Documentary Series or Special. Julian Hart edited the series, and was also nominated for an Emmy.

== Release ==
The series was released on Netflix on 2 February 2022.>

== Reception ==
=== Critical response ===
On Rotten Tomatoes, the film has an approval rating of 96% based on 27 reviews, with an average rating of 7.50/10. The website's critics consensus reads: "Chillingly addictive viewing, The Tinder Swindler offers a solidly crafted – albeit heartbreaking – treat for true crime fans."

Kevin Maher of The Times gave the film 4 out of 5 stars, describing it as "the Jaws of internet dating documentaries" and wrote: "it's so visceral, propulsive and alarming that the prospect of online dating after The Tinder Swindler might seem very foolhardy indeed." Rebecca Nicholson of The Guardian also gave it 4/5 stars, writing: "The Tinder Swindler is snappy and smart and leaves you wanting more, rather than scraping the barrel for every possible angle." Ed Cumming of The Independent also gave it 4/5 stars, saying: "Despite the great yarn at its centre, [the film] sometimes lapses into the self-indulgence common to so many modern documentaries, with endless shadowy reconstructions and a heart-tugging soundtrack."

Brian Lowry of CNN was more critical of the film, writing: "Combining the qualities of a Lifetime movie with a catchy title, the marketable elements scarcely mask that the story is actually kind of a bore."

The movie clocked 45.8 million hours viewed globally across the week of 31 January–6 February, and hit the top 10 on Netflix in 92 countries.

=== Awards and nominations ===
Year	Award	Category	Nominee(s)	Result	Ref.
2022	Hollywood Critics Association TV Awards	Best Streaming Documentary Television Movie	The Tinder Swindler	Nominated	
2022	Primetime Emmy Awards	Outstanding Documentary or Nonfiction Special	Bart Layton, Sam Starbuck, Jeff Gaspin, Eric Levy, Stuart Ford, Lourdes Diaz, and Bernadette Higgins	Nominated	
2022	Primetime Emmy Awards	Outstanding Writing for a Nonfiction Programming	Felicity Morris	Nominated	
2022	Primetime Emmy Awards	Outstanding Music Composition for a Documentary Series or Special	Jessica Jones	Nominated	
2022	Primetime Emmy Awards	Outstanding Picture Editing for a Nonfiction Program	Julian Hart	Nominated	
2022	Primetime Emmy Awards	Outstanding Sound Editing for a Nonfiction or Reality Program (Single or Multi-Camera)	Maria Kelly, Chad Orororo, and Nirupama Rajendran	Nominated	
2022	Television Critics Association Awards	Outstanding Achievement in News and Information	The Tinder Swindler	Nominated	

== Other responses ==
The epilogue shown before the end credits states that Hayut remains an active member of Tinder. Following the release of the film, however, Tinder permanently banned Hayut from its platform. Match Group, Tinder's parent company, also banned Hayut from its other dating apps: Hinge, Match.com, Plenty of Fish, and OkCupid.

Variety reported on 4 February 2022 that Netflix was planning to make the documentary into a dramatised movie.

Netflix released a special three-part companion podcast that tells about the making of the documentary and digs deeper into Hayut's life and methods.

On 5 February 2022, the three victims set up a GoFundMe fundraiser campaign to compensate for their debts.

On 22 February 2022, Hayut's bodyguard, Peter, sued Netflix for $5.6 million, saying that he had not been consulted and was portrayed inaccurately in the series, and had nothing to do with Hayut's deceptions.

In late February 2022, Hayut launched an NFT collection and merchandise with images seen and quotes heard in the film.

== Spinoff ==
In September 2025, Netflix released a six-episode series called Love Con Revenge which follows one of The Tinder Swindler victims who attempts to expose others similar to Leviev.

== See also ==
- Catfishing
- Romance scam
- Online dating
- Dating app
