= Coventry experiment =

1960s UK nutrition and radiation study involving South Asian women

The Coventry Experiment was a mid-20th-century nutrition study conducted in Coventry, England, during the late 1950s and early 1960s. The study involved administering small doses of radioactive iron isotope (Fe-59) to a group of South Asian women—primarily of Indian and Pakistani origin—to study iron absorption and anaemia. It was organised under the auspices of the Medical Research Council (MRC) and the Atomic Energy Authority (AEA).

The experiment later became controversial due to the alleged absence of informed consent and the targeting of a vulnerable immigrant population. Public awareness of the study emerged in the 1990s through Freedom of Information disclosures, leading to questions in Parliament and investigations by journalists and ethicists.

== Background ==
During the post-war decades, the UK government and health institutions funded research into nutritional deficiencies among immigrant populations. Coventry, which saw a significant rise in immigration from the Indian subcontinent in the 1950s, was one of several urban centres chosen for studies on anaemia and malnutrition. Researchers from the MRC and AEA sought to determine how efficiently women of different dietary backgrounds absorbed iron.

== Experiment ==
In the Coventry study, a small group of women were provided with food and drinks laced with radioactive iron isotope (Fe-59). The aim was to trace how the body processed and stored iron using radiological detection methods. The total radiation exposure was described as being within limits considered “safe” at the time. Participants were selected from local health clinics and community centres in Coventry. The results of the research were first published in The American Journal of Clinical Nutrition, with Peter Elwood as one of the lead researchers.

== Controversy and lack of consent ==
Later investigations revealed that many participants were not fully informed of the nature of the experiment or of the radioactive content of the food they consumed. Language barriers and limited understanding of medical terminology may have compounded the lack of informed consent. Critics argued that the recruitment of Indian and Pakistani women—many from low-income or recently immigrated families—represented a breach of ethical and cultural sensitivity.

Media reports and parliamentary questions in the mid-1990s brought the case to public attention, as part of a wider examination of Cold War–era radiation research in Britain. The government later confirmed the existence of the Coventry study, describing it as part of broader nutritional research rather than weapons testing, but acknowledged deficiencies in communication and consent procedures by modern ethical standards.

Later scrutiny, including discussion in the British Medical Journal (BMJ), cleared the MRC of wrongdoing while noting the ethically problematic nature of the experiment: participants were often not fully informed that they were ingesting a radioactive substance, and the process of obtaining informed consent was arguably inadequate or absent. The BMJ coverage emphasised that although the radiation doses given were considered medically safe by the standards of that time, the study's design exposed deep shortcomings in researcher transparency, ethical oversight, and respect for vulnerable communities.

== Government and institutional response ==
The MRC launched its inquiry into the radiation experiments after a Channel 4 documentary Deadly Experiments, directed by John Brownlow was broadcast in July 1995 which raised concerns about the way this and other research had been conducted. While the inquiry concluded that radiation doses were medically insignificant, it noted the absence of adequate participant consent and record-keeping. The Medical Research Council subsequently reaffirmed its commitment to modern ethical oversight through institutional review boards and transparency standards.

== Legacy and ethical debate ==
The Coventry Experiment is now cited in academic literature and bioethics education as a case study in informed consent and the treatment of vulnerable populations in research. Scholars have highlighted it as evidence of institutional paternalism and racial bias within post-war British scientific practice. The case is frequently compared with the Tuskegee syphilis study in the United States and other Cold War radiation experiments, underscoring the global evolution of medical ethics.

In the years following disclosure, debates around the Coventry experiment have fed into revisions in UK medical ethics standards, particularly regarding vulnerable subjects, consent protocols, and post-study transparency.

== See also ==
- Deadly Experiments
- Human radiation experiments
- Informed consent
- Medical ethics
- Tuskegee syphilis study
- United Kingdom Atomic Energy Authority
