= The Hoarder Next Door =

- Narrated by: Olivia Colman
- Country of origin: United Kingdom
- Original language: English
- No. of series: 3
- No. of episodes: 15

Production
- Running time: 60 minutes (inc. adverts)
- Production company: Twenty Twenty

Original release
- Network: Channel 4
- Release: 3 May 2012 – 17 April 2014

The Hoarder Next Door is a British documentary series about compulsive hoarding. Produced by Twenty Twenty and shown on Channel 4 it features psychotherapist Stelios Kiosses helping extreme hoarders. The show is narrated by Olivia Colman.

== Episodes ==
=== Transmissions ===
Series	Episodes	Originally released	
Series	Episodes	First released	Last released
1	4	3 May 2012	24 May 2012
Christmas Special		21 December 2012	
2	4	15 April 2013	6 May 2013
3	6	13 March 2014	17 April 2014

=== Series 1 (2012) ===
The first series began on 3 May 2012 on Channel 4.

No. overall	No. in series	Title	Original release date	Viewers (millions)
1	1	"Nigel"	3 May 2012	3.11
Nigel Jennings is 55 and lives in a terraced house in Liverpool. He is gay and has lived with his two cats since the death of his partner from cancer. His decluttering involves his next-door neighbour, a skip and his alter ego, Miranda.
2	2	"Tricia and Paul"	10 May 2012	2.53
Tricia is a former actress and Paul is a jazz enthusiast.
3	3	"Helen, Jack and Yvonne"	17 May 2012	2.68
In Somerset, widow Helen and her 18-year-old son Jack have hoarded after the death of Jack's father in 1995. Yvonne lives in Blackburn, Lancashire.
4	4	"Tina and Joanne"	24 May 2012	2.28
Tina Vaughan is 44 and collects 1960s items; she lives in a flat with two cats. Joanne Gill is 71 and lives alone.

=== Christmas Special (2012) ===
No. overall	No. in series	Title	Original release date	Viewers (millions)
5	1	"Christmas Special"	21 December 2012	1.33
Fifty-eight-year-old Pauline is a huge fan of Christmas and boasts a vast collection of inaccessible Christmas decorations; hundreds of tins of out-of-date food, with several freezers filled with the same; and seven Christmas trees buried somewhere among the clutter. But this year Pauline is determined to celebrate Christmas in her house with her grandchildren for the very first time. Helping Pauline in her ambition is psychotherapist Stelios Kiosses, together with straight talking de-clutterers Zoe Steel and Allyson Pritchard, Stelios helps Pauline tackle her hoards and reclaim her home. The Christmas special also features antiques dealer Greg, whose growing collection of 'repair' projects has taken over his girlfriend Judith's house.

=== Series 2 (2013) ===
The second series began on 15 April 2013 on Channel 4.

No. overall	No. in series	Title	Original release date	Viewers (millions)
6	1	"Alison and Jo"	15 April 2013	1.99
Forty-one-year-old Alison reveals how her massive hoard of ladybird possessions is taking over her home. After spending £40,000 on her hoard of clothes, ornaments and shoes, Alison needs to tackle the situation, as both her home and her relationship with boyfriend Sam are at breaking point. In Windsor, 62-year-old widow Jo is a primary school teacher who has filled her home with text-books, toys and magazines. The hoard is taking over every room and the hazardous passageways have started to collapse around her. Helping both Alison and Jo to reclaim their homes is leading psychotherapist Stelios Kiosses and his team of no nonsense de-clutterers. Will Alison's relationship survive the changes, and will Jo - one of the hardest cases yet - get rid of any of her collection?
7	2	"Sarah and Roddy"	22 April 2013	TBA
Single mum Sarah from Dorset reveals how the two bedroom flat she shares with teenage son Ally is being taken over by her vast hoard of knick-knacks and clutter, putting a constant strain on their relationship. Fifty-six-year-old bachelor Roddy's impressive five storey home in London has become overwhelmed by 29 years' worth of newspapers, with Roddy no longer able to sleep in his own bedroom. It's time for him to clear out the junk.
8	3	"Tina and Liz"	29 April 2013	TBA
In London, 42-year-old Tina is desperate to tackle the hoard of family memorabilia that has gathered over the decades in the home she has lived in since she was a child. With cuddly toys still cluttering up her bedroom and the wardrobes overflowing with her parents' clothes, Tina needs help so that she can move on from the house and the memories which fill it. In Scotland, 48-year-old mum of two Liz is clashing with her family about the vast mountain of possessions which she has crammed into the living and dining room of their home.
9	4	"Ursula and Nigel (revisited)"	6 May 2013	TBA
In Lancashire, 54-year-old Ursula is desperate to tackle her compulsive shopping habit. While in Rugby, bachelor Nigel has let his love of car parts take over his home. Over the past decade Ursula has built up a collection of impulse buys, worth more than £45,000, which are taking over the living room and kitchen. With the family forced to prepare their food on an ironing board - despite the numerous kitchen appliances which Ursula has hoarded - the household is at breaking point. With family and friends unable to visit, Nigel needs to sort out his hoard so that he can once again enjoy company in his house. However, Nigel is only able to moves things from one side of the room to the other, and seems unwilling to address the clutter which is causing his isolation.

=== Series 3 (2014) ===
The third and final series began on 13 March 2014 on Channel 4.

No. overall	No. in series	Title	Original release date	Viewers (millions)
10	1	"Michelle and Carl"	13 March 2014	TBA
Psychotherapist Stelios Kiosses and de-clutterers Zoe and Allyson help hoarders clear the clutter. This week they visit Michelle and Andrew's animal rescue home in Kent and Carl and Gemma.
11	2	"Alex and Lawrence"	20 March 2014	TBA
Professional declutterers Alison and Zoe and therapist Stelios Kiosses help Alex address his memorabilia mountain
12	3	"Margret and Claire"	27 March 2014	TBA
Can therapist Stelios Kiosses help Margaret, a devoted mum, who is living in chaos? And the show meets 'Disney Claire' whose collection of 30,000 Disney figures are overrunning her home.
13	4	"David and Paul"	3 April 2014	TBA
In Bury St Edmunds, David's passion for music and buying records has spiralled into a compulsion to hoard anything that takes his fancy. And de-clutterers Allyson and Zoe meet Paul in Essex.
14	5	"Graham and Theodora"	10 April 2014	TBA
In Milton Keynes, divorcee Graham's love of a bargain means that his home is overflowing with clutter. The same is true for Theodora in rural Lincolnshire. Can therapist Stelios help?
15	6	"Doreen and Alison (revisited)"	17 April 2014	TBA
In Bexley, every inch of Doreen's three-bedroom home is overflowing with stuff. Doreen is so ashamed of the situation, she hasn't let friends or family inside for over 14 years.
