= Simon Leviev =

Israeli businessman (born 1990)

- סיימון לבייב
- Born: Shimon Yehuda Hayut; 27 September 1990 (age 36); Ramat Elchanan, Bnei Brak, Israel
- Status: Released
- Criminal charges: fraud
- Penalty: 3 years in Finnish prison; 15 months in Israeli prison, ₪150,000 compensation, ₪20,000 fine

Details
- Imprisoned at: Finland (2015), Israel (2019), Georgia (2025)

Simon Leviev (Hebrew: סיימון לבייב; born Shimon Yehuda Hayut, 27 September 1990), is an Israeli business man and convicted felon. According to The Times of Israel, between 2017 and 2019 he allegedly conned $10 million from banks in a Ponzi scheme. His criminal activity became widely known in 2019 after the publication of an article titled "The Tinder Swindler" by investigative journalists from the Norwegian tabloid Verdens Gang, with the support of Israeli journalist Uri Blau, and later with the release of the 2022 Netflix documentary of the same name.

== Early life ==
Leviev was born Shimon Yehuda Hayut (Hebrew: שמעון יהודה חיות) in 1990 in Ramat Elchanan, Bnei Brak, Israel. His father is Yohanan Hayut, the Chief Rabbi of El Al airlines. At the age of 15 he moved to Brooklyn, New York in the US with his family's friends. According to interviews done by Felicity Morris, Leviev has been committing minor cons like cheque fraud since he was a teenager. He later changed his legal name from Shimon Hayut to Simon Leviev, using the surname Leviev to pretend he was related to Lev Avnerovich Leviev, an Israeli businessman known as "The King of Diamonds".

== Criminal activity and legal trouble ==
In 2011, Hayut was charged in Israel with theft, forgery, and fraud for cashing stolen checks. According to reports, he stole a checkbook belonging to a family while babysitting their child, and another's while working as a handyman at their home. He never showed up in court and escaped the country across the border into Jordan with a fake passport under the name Mordechai Nisim Tapiro, and fled to Europe. In 2012, he was indicted by an Israeli court and charged with theft and forgery of checks, as well as for leaving a five-year-old he was babysitting unattended. In 2015, he was arrested in Finland and was sentenced to three years in prison. When arrested in Finland, he claimed he was an Israeli man born in 1978 and was found with two forged Israeli passports, three forged Israeli driver's licenses, two forged Israeli flight permits, and five American Express credit cards.

After finishing his sentence early, he returned to Israel to be recharged and sentenced in 2017. However, according to The Times of Israel, he assumed a different identity by changing his legal name to Simon Leviev and fled the country again. Hayut travelled around Europe, pretending to be different people. He allegedly also presented himself as the son of Russian-Israeli diamond mogul Lev Leviev, using the dating app Tinder to contact women as Leviev, and tricked them into loaning him money that he never repaid. He would charm women with lavish gifts, taking them to dinners on private jets. He would later pretend he was being targeted by his "enemies", often sending the same messages and images pretending that his bodyguard was attacked, asking his victims to help him financially.

In 2019, he was arrested by Interpol in Greece after using a forged passport. Later that year, he was sentenced to 15 months in prison in Israel, but was released five months later as a result of the coronavirus pandemic. According to The Mirror, he later offered "business advice" for a fee via a website. According to The Times of Israel, in 2020 he pretended to be a medical worker to get the COVID-19 vaccine early.

In an interview with CNN on 21 February 2022, he denied defrauding the women, claiming he was just a "single guy who wanted to meet some girls on Tinder." and that his money came from Bitcoin he bought very early on in 2011.

In February 2022, attorneys for the Leviev family filed a criminal complaint against Hayut with the Tel Aviv Magistrate's Court, for libelous publications, infringing privacy and violating trademark orders. In July 2022, they filed another criminal complaint against Hayut for damaging the family's name. The hearing of the Leviev family's complaint was postponed after the Israeli prosecutor's office sent a request to postpone the hearing on the grounds that Simon Leviev is the focus of a criminal investigation for the same offenses.

On 15 September 2025, he was arrested at the request of Interpol after landing at the Batumi International Airport in Georgia.

On 14 November 2025 his attorneys Sharon Nahari and Mariam Kublaschwili announced that Leviev has been released from prison in Georgia without any sanctions. According to the legal team, German authorities had ended the enquiry due to a lack of evidence and cancelled the extradition request which had been the basis for his arrest.

== In popular culture ==
In 2022, Netflix released a video documentary, The Tinder Swindler, which describes his story as told by three women. According to The Washington Post, it became the most watched documentary on Netflix following its release, and was nominated for five Emmy awards.

In 2022, shortly after the release of the documentary, Leviev signed with talent manager Gina Rodriguez of Gitoni Inc. in pursuing a career in the entertainment industry. He is working on publishing a book, along with a movie and TV Series based on his life story.
