= List of Evacuation episodes =

These are the episodes that have been in the CBBC Television Series Evacuation. The first series was simply called "Evacuation", while the second series was titled "Evacuation - To the Manor House". Altogether there are 20 episodes. The first series ran in September 2006 – with Episodes 5 to 10 being broadcast in pairs back-to-back, i.e. as 'double-bills' – and the second series ran from January to February 2008.

The episode titles given here have merely been devised to convey the flavour of each instalment, and were not shown on-screen.

== Series One (2006) ==
1. Arrival at Castle Farm 4 September 2006
2. Collecting Eggs 5 September 2006
3. Postcards Home 6 September 2006
4. The Anderson Shelter 7 September 2006
5. The Warden 8 September 2006 (double-bill)
6. Wash Day 8 September 2006
7. Private Pickard 11 September 2006 (double-bill)
8. The Vicar Comes to Tea 11 September 2006
9. American Dancing 12 September 2006 (double-bill)
10. The End of the War 12 September 2006

== Series Two (To The Manor House) (2008) ==
1. Arrival at Pradoe Hall 17 January 2008
2. Lunch with Lady Olstead 18 January 2008
3. School with Miss Young 24 January 2008
4. Miss Young's PE Lesson 25 January 2008
5. A Night in the Cellar 31 January 2008
6. Pheasant Shooting Season 1 February 2008
7. The New Arrival 7 February 2008
8. The Fete 8 February 2008
9. The Upper Class 14 February 2008
10. Going Home 15 February 2008
