= Boing (African TV channel) =

- Country: South Africa
- Broadcast area: Africa
- Headquarters: Cape Town

Programming
- Language: English
- Picture format: 576i SDTV

Ownership
- Parent: Skydance Corporation
- Sister channels: Cartoon Network; Cartoonito; TNT; Discovery Channel; Investigation Discovery; Real Time; TLC; Food Network; Travel Channel

History
- Launched: 30 May 2015; 11 years ago

Availability

Terrestrial
- Azam TV: Channel 221
- StarTimes: Channel 354

Boing is an African television channel operated by Skydance Corporation through its International unit, which launched on 30 May 2015. A localization of the eponymous Italian television service, the channel airs programming primarily from sister channels Cartoon Network and Boomerang, as well as those from other producers.

At this moment, the channel can be seen on Montage Cable TV in Nigeria and Sentech's Mobile TV in South Africa. On 1 January 2017, the channel became available to AzamTV subscribers. The channel does not have a website. The former French feed of Boing was also broadcast in Sub-Saharan Africa and the Maghreb. On 2 February 2023, it was announced that Boing France would be replaced by Cartoonito on 3 April 2023.

On 3 November 2023, StarSat/StarTimes launched Boing Africa on Sub-Saharan Africa.
