= Deadly Experiments =

- Creative director: Joe Bullman

Production
- Producer: John Brownlow
- Production company: Twenty Twenty Productions

Original release
- Network: Channel 4
- Release: 6 July 1995

Deadly Experiments was a documentary aired on Channel 4 in 1995 as part of their True Stories series. It was produced by Twenty Twenty Television and featured several US and UK based research projects conducted in the 1950s and 60s which involved radioactive administration to humans, including the Coventry experiment.

== Legacy ==
- "Women thought they could trust their GP. They were part of a deadly experiment". Metro. 29 August 2023.
- "Search for women fed radioactive chapatis". BBC CWR. Coventry and Warwickshire: BBC. 30 August 2023.
- "Daughter questions Coventry radioactive chapati study consent". bbc.com/news. 31 August 2023.
- Shackle, Samira (11 February 2025). "The Coventry experiment: why were Indian women in Britain given radioactive food without their consent?". The Guardian.
