= Boing (TV channel) =

Children's television channel

Boing S.p.A.

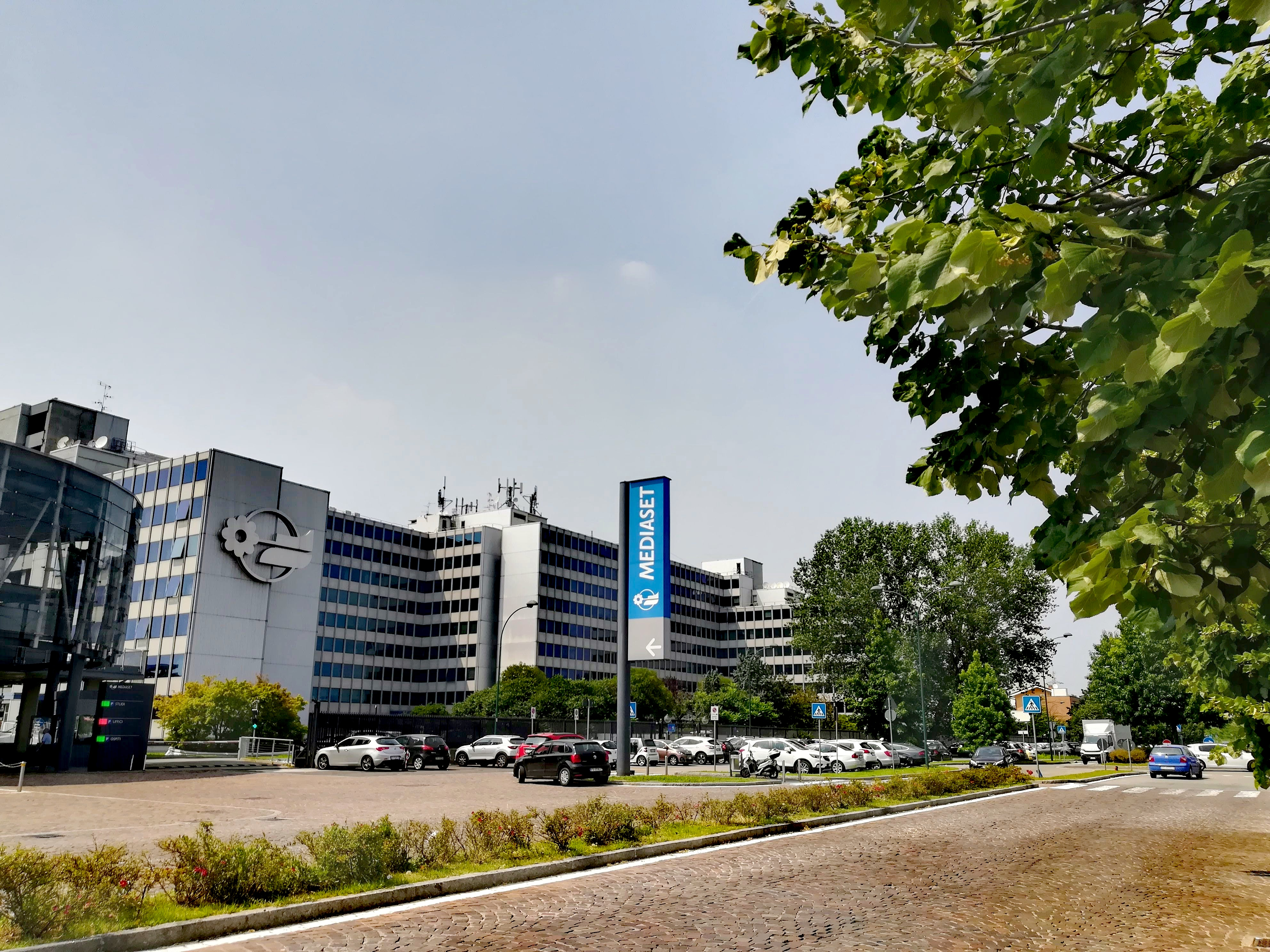
- Headquarters in Cologno Monzese (Milan)
- Type: Joint venture
- Traded as: Boing
- Industry: Mass media
- Founded: 20 November 2004; 21 years ago
- Headquarters: Cologno Monzese, Milan, Italy
- Area served: Italy; Spain; Africa (using The French version of the website)
- Key people: Jaime Ondarza (CEO); Silvio Carini (President)
- Products: Television networks Programming blocks Websites
- Owner: MFE - MediaForEurope, 51% Skydance, 49%
- Parent: RTI/Mediaset, Skydance, 49%
- Website: www.boingtv.it

Boing is the brand name used by the International division of Skydance co-owned by Mediaset for a collection of television networks outside of the United States that target children and teenagers.

As of 3 April 2023, Boing-branded channels exist in Italy (its flagship service), Spain, and in Africa, while a weekend morning programming block formerly aired on the WarnerMedia-owned Chilevisión (now owned by Vytal Group) in Chile and TV2 in Turkey (previously TNT).

== Broadcast ==
=== Italy ===
The Italian free-to-air television channel marketed at children and teenagers, owned by Boing S.p.A., a joint venture of Fininvest's MFE - MediaForEurope (through its Mediaset Italia subsidiary) and Skydance (through its International division). It is available on digital terrestrial television and free-to-air satellite provider Tivùsat.

=== Spain ===
The Spanish free-to-air television channel launched in 2010 and owned as a joint venture between Mediaset España and Skydance through its International unit. Series on the channel are also available in English via a secondary audio feed. Additional feeds are available in Italy, and Sub-Saharan Africa.

=== France ===
The French pay television channel aimed at children and teenagers launched on 8 April 2010. On 2 February 2023, it was announced that Boing would transition to Cartoonito full-time on 3 April 2023.

=== Africa ===
The African television channel operated by Skydance through its international unit, which launched on 30 May 2015. At this moment, the channel can be seen on Montage Cable TV in Nigeria and Sentech's Mobile TV in South Africa. On 1 January 2017, the channel became available to AzamTV subscribers. The channel does not have a website. The French version of Boing is also broadcast in Sub-Saharan Africa and the Maghreb. On 2 February 2023, it was announced that Boing French would be replaced by a Cartoonito channel French on 3 April 2023. On 3 November 2023, StarSat/StarTimes launched Boing Africa on Sub-Saharan Africa.

=== Chile ===
Boing launched on Chilevisión on 7 January 2018 as a programming block, but it later ended on 29 March 2020.

=== Turkey ===
Boing launched on TNT in 2012 as a programming block, even after the channel was replaced by Teve2, the block still continued, it also aired on Cartoon Network Turkey starting in 2014.

== The Animadz ==
A group of characters known as the Animadz serve as Boing's official mascots since 2006. They include Bo, a blue dog-like human, Bobo, a hairless green humanoid, Otto, a robot, Maissa, a yellow maize, Katrina, a white chicken, and Dino, a green dinosaur. There were four more mascots that have retired in 2016, which are Ridolfo, a brown hyena, Tony, a yellow hamster, Tip, a male seal, and Tap, a female seal. In 2019, Otto, Maissa, Katrina and Dino were dropped, but Bo and Bobo remained in use as of today.

== See also ==
- Cartoon Network
- Boomerang
- Cartoonito
- Pogo
- Tooncast
