= TNT Africa =

TNT
- Broadcast area: MENA; Greece; Cyprus; Turkey (TCM MENA); Sub-Saharan Africa (TNT Africa)
- Headquarters: Turner House, Great Marlborough Street, London, United Kingdom

Programming
- Language: English
- Picture format: 16:9, 1080i (HDTV) (Africa); 16:9, 1080i (HDTV) (MENA)

Ownership
- Owner: Warner Bros. Discovery International
- Sister channels: Cartoon Network; Cartoon Network Arabic; Cartoon Network Hindi; Cartoonito; CNN International; HLN; Discovery Channel; Discovery Family; Investigation Discovery; Real Time; TLC; Food Network; Travel Channel

History
- Launched: 17 September 1993; 33 years ago
- Former names: TNT (original) (1993–1999); Turner Classic Movies (1999–2018)

Links
- Website: www.tnt.africa

Availability

Terrestrial
- DStv (TNT Africa): Channel 137
- GOtv (TNT Africa): Channel 16
- Zuku TV (TNT Africa): Channel 225
- StarTimes (TNT Africa): Channel 126

TNT is a pay television channel focused on movies. The network is broadcast in Africa under the TNT name (formerly TCM Africa until 2018), as well as in the Arab world as TCM MENA; the latter features its own schedule and optional Arabic subtitles.

TCM MENA was split off from the African feed on 1 January 2016, and is available exclusively on BeIN. Meanwhile, TNT Africa is available in many providers (DStv, Black, StarTimes and Canal+).

== History ==
Turner Classic Movies rebranded to a new logo in 2009.

The African website, TCMAfrica.com, launched in 2011.

Turner Classic Movies Africa switched to a 16:9 widescreen presentation on 15 November 2015.

On 27 December 2015, Turner Classic Movies stopped broadcasting on OSN and moved to beIN in the Arab world. This was the result of an agreement between Turner Broadcasting System EMEA and beIN which moved all of the former's pay-TV channels to the latter, including Turner Classic Movies, Cartoon Network, Boomerang and CNN.

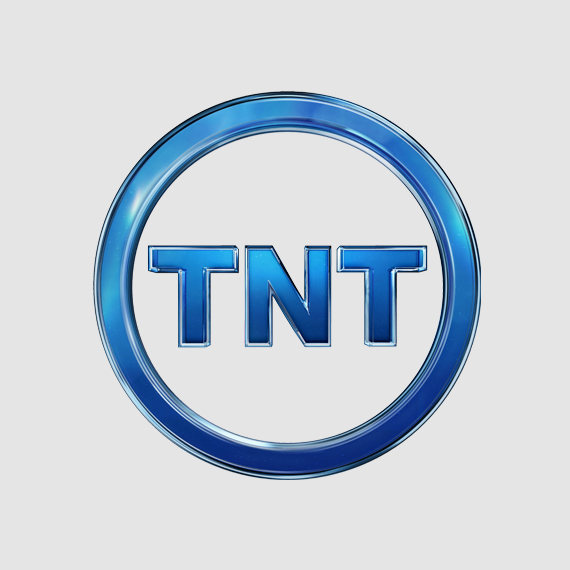
TNT Africa 2018–2021 logo.

On 1 January 2016, TCM MEA was split into TCM Africa and TCM MENA. On 21 September 2018, TCM Africa was rebranded to TNT Africa with this version being a movie channel carrying a bit of Turner Classic Movies in its line-up for a modern audience across Africa on DStv and Black. The rebranding allowed TCM Africa to offer such films as Doom, Gladiator The Green Mile, Hellboy 2: The Golden Army, The Illusionist, Robin Hood, and Tango & Cash for at least two days. On 18 December 2018, TNT Africa and Cartoon Network Africa were launched in HD on DStv. In January 2021, TNT Africa was rebranded, and announced on 22 January that the channel would begin airing AEW Dynamite with their secondary show AEW Rampage airing later that year.

In November 2025, it was reported that TNT alongside the company's 11 other TV channels might be exiting DStv and GOtv due to a carriage dispute with MultiChoice.

== See also ==
- Turner Classic Movies
- List of international Turner Classic Movies channels
