= Cartoon Network (Spain) =

Defunct Spanish version of Cartoon Network

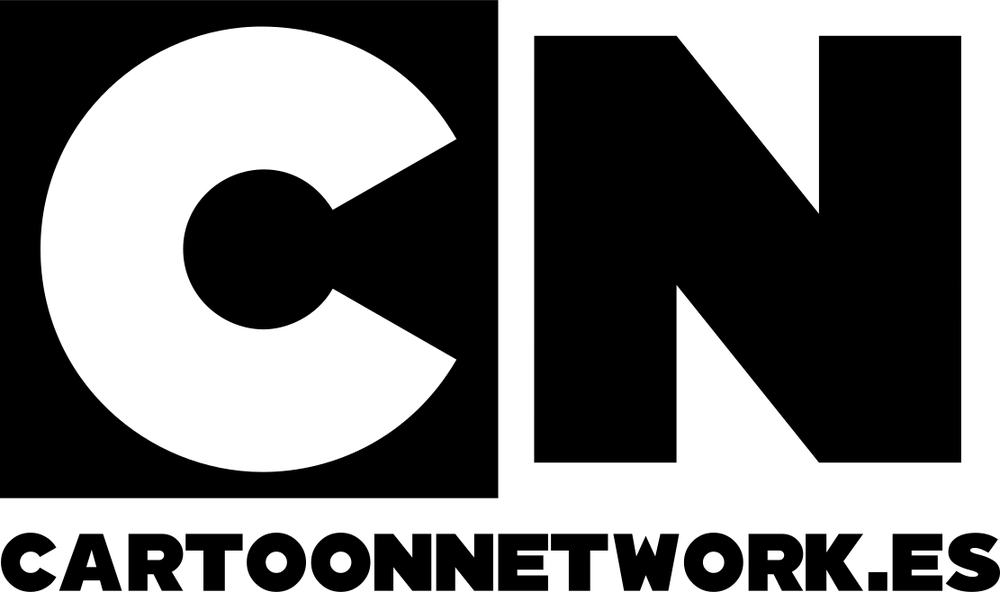
- Country: United Kingdom
- Broadcast area: Spain; Andorra
- Headquarters: 160 Old Street, London, England, United Kingdom

Programming
- Languages: Castilian Spanish; Secondary audio feed: English or Catalan or Galician (on certain programmes)
- Picture format: 4:3 SDTV

Ownership
- Owner: Turner Broadcasting System España
- Sister channels: Cartoonito

History
- Launched: 4 March 1994; 32 years ago
- Replaced: Cartoon Network (pan-EMEA)
- Closed: 30 June 2013; 13 years ago

Links
- Website: cartoonnetwork.es (archived June 8, 2013)

Cartoon Network was a British-managed Spanish specialty television channel aimed at children, operated by Time Warner through its subsidiary Turner Broadcasting System España (TBS España). It was a localised version of the original namesake American channel. The channel's programmes were mostly consisted of original animated productions from Cartoon Network and fellow Time Warner company Warner Bros., but it also broadcast other American and international productions.

Besides being available in Castilian Spanish, most shows were also available in English, Catalan and Galician through a secondary audio feed. The channel along with Cartoonito closed in Spain on 30 June 2013, due to declining ratings and the pay TV crisis.

== History ==
=== Background ===
In 1993, Cartoon Network had a single European signal distributed via the Astra satellite, and already had five audios in different languages. On 4 March 1994, (although Turner initially said it would happen before the end of 1993) the sixth language of the channel was added: Spanish. Later, the channel was also added to Spanish cable networks.

=== Launch ===
In 1997, Canal Satélite Digital signed an agreement with Time Warner in which, apart from obtaining rights from the production company, it also benefited from the entry of Cartoon Network and TNT in its offer. The channel was broadcast in the majority of pay TV companies, in some including the Cartoon Network +1 channel, with the same programming, but one hour later. In addition, a magazine called Cartoon Network Magazine was published, but it did not manage the channel, since the license belonged to another owner. In September 1999, the channel started broadcasting an independent feed, catering to local viewer tastes.

In March 2001, the channel started boosting its original content, by introducing Dexter presenta (Dexter Presents), a late afternoon block featuring Dexter (from Dexter's Laboratory), airing series such as The Real Adventures of Jonny Quest and Detective Conan. The channel had to air content whose storylines reflected reality by speaking directly to kids.

In March 2006, Televisión de Galicia allowed the sale of the Galician dub of Crayon Shin-chan to the channel, which it hoped to air in a second audio track.

On 1 May 2006, Cartoon Network Spain adopted the City era. The channel premiered Camp Lazlo in conjunction with the rebrand and announced My Gym Partner's a Monkey for September.

=== Closure ===
Turner Broadcasting System Europe announced on 14 June 2013 that Cartoon Network and Cartoonito would close in Spain on 30 June 2013, due to declining ratings and the pay TV crisis in Spain, which was a result of complications from the 2008 financial crisis.

On 20 June, a post on the blog of the Cartoon Network website was published announcing the closure of its television broadcasts to its viewers, but noted that the website would remain active, with its content becoming available on demand (VOD) services for tablets, smartphones or televisions connected to the internet in which viewers could watch the series and content of the channel. This would eventually evolve with the launch of Time Warner's own online VOD service in Spain, HBO España in 2016 (which would become HBO Max in 2021).

It was also explained that these contents would also be available on the channel's website, and that Turner would increase its presence on Boing, the children's channel which TBS España jointly owns with Mediaset España.

Shortly before midnight on 1 July 2013, the channel closed in Spain after 19 years, with the last programme to be aired being an episode of Star Wars: The Clone Wars. The channel then displayed a filler, and after a few minutes, each operator that distributed the signal replaced it with an information screen informing customers that the channel had shut down in Spain. However, the channel's website remained active until 21 November 2024, when it was discontinued and redirected to Max.

At the end of August, Boing announced that from 14 September, the channel would broadcast a programming block called "Findes Cartoon Network" every weekend, which would broadcast new episodes of Adventure Time and Regular Show from 10:30.
