= Wakey Wakey Campers =

British reality television/game show series

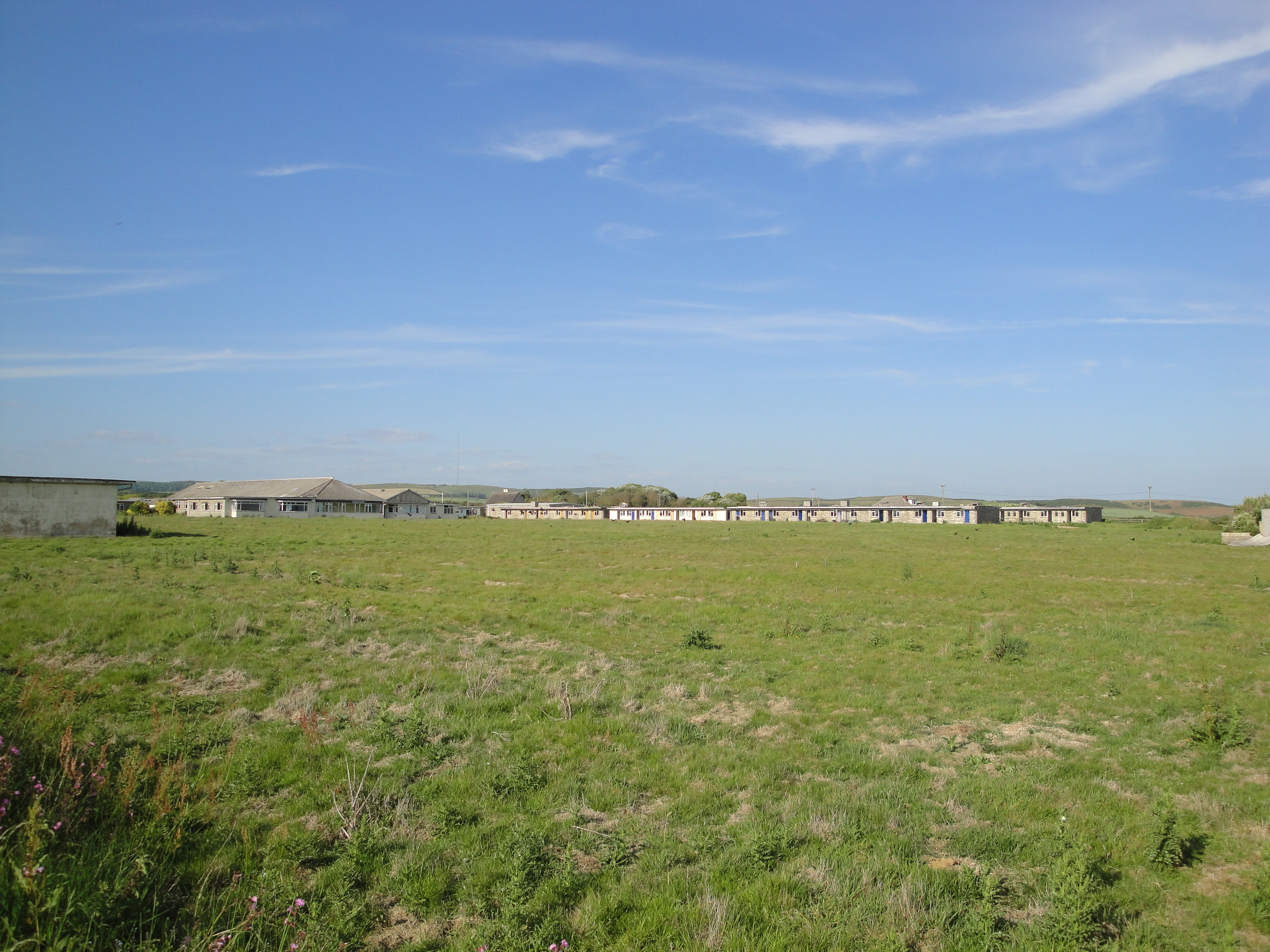
- Atherfield Bay Holiday Centre, the location of the series.
- Starring: Debbie Chazen; Tony King
- Country of origin: United Kingdom
- Original language: English
- No. of series: 1
- No. of episodes: 4

Production
- Running time: 60 mins (inc. adverts)
- Production company: Twenty Twenty Television

Original release
- Network: Channel 4
- Release: 30 August – 20 September 2005

Wakey Wakey Campers is a British reality television/game show series about a group of modern holiday-makers who stay on a mock 1960s-style holiday camp. The series finds out whether they will enjoy the experience, lack of technology, living conditions and activities. The series was filmed at Atherfield Bay Holiday Camp in the Isle of Wight and starred, among others, singer-songwriter and entertainer Tony King, South west comedian Neil "Buster" Brimson and St.Helens born comedy vocalist John Devereux.

The series was produced by Twenty Twenty Television for Channel 4, and aired on Tuesday nights from 30 August to 20 September 2005. Viewing figures peaked at 2.3 million, and was featured as Radio Times front cover for the shows opening month.
