= Cartoonito =

International preschool television brand

- Logo used since 2021
- Product type: Television networks; Programming blocks
- Current owner: Skydance Corporation
- Country: List: United States (block) Latin America (network and block) United Kingdom and Ireland (network and block) Italy (network) Nordic countries (2022–2023 as block; 2023–present as network) France (2011–2013 as block; 2023–present as network) Spain (network, 2011–2013) Portugal (2022–2023 as block; 2023–present as network) Turkey (network and block) Central and Eastern Europe (2011–2014, 2022–2023 as block; 2023–present as network) Middle East and Africa (2011–2014, 2022–2023 as block; 2023–present as network) Japan (block) Southeast Asia (2022–2023 as block; 2012–2014, 2023–present as network; 2026-present Philippines) Taiwan (block) South Korea (2022–2024 as block; 2024–present as network) South Asia (block) Oceania (block)
- Related brands: Tickle-U (U.S. block); Tiny TV (international brand)
- Website: International sites (dead link redirects to its YouTube channel except Italy)

Cartoonito is a brand name used by Skydance Corporation for a collection of television networks and programming blocks aimed at preschool children. The name combines the "cartoon" with the Spanish suffix "ito", meaning "small".

As of November 2025, Cartoonito broadcasts as a television channel across Europe (including the United Kingdom and Ireland, where it originated), the Middle East, Africa, Latin America, Southeast Asia, and South Korea; as a block on Cartoon Network in the US with no branding, and Cartoon Network in the UK with branding, the Middle East, Turkey, Japan, the Philippines, Taiwan, South Asia, and New Zealand.

== Background ==
=== Predecessors (1996–2006) ===
==== Educational blocks (1996–2005) ====
In 1996, Cartoon Network created a Sunday morning block of preschool programs consisting of Big Bag, a live-action/puppet television program produced by the Children's Television Workshop (known for Sesame Street), and Small World, a block of animated preschool series from foreign countries. The block moved to weekday mornings in spring 1998, with Big Bag's second season premiering at the same time, before moving to an earlier Sunday-morning timeslot and lasting until 2002.

In 1997, Warner Bros. Animation began developing Baby Looney Tunes, an original preschool series inspired by merchandise based on the Looney Tunes franchise. The series ran on Cartoon Network from 2002 to 2005. Cartoon Network aired other programs for children aged 4 to 8 alongside Baby Looney Tunes, including Hamtaro, Sitting Ducks, and Pecola.

==== Tiny TV (2003–2006) ====
In 2003, Cartoon Network's Indian counterpart introduced Tiny TV, a weekday morning block of acquired preschool cartoons such as Bob the Builder, Kipper, Noddy, and Oswald. By 2006, it had expanded to Cartoon Network and Boomerang channels in Australia, Southeast Asia, and Latin America. Each block carried its own lineup of programs, with only a few shared between feeds. Tiny TV was discontinued internationally in 2007, but was temporarily revived on POGO (a sister channel to Cartoon Network India) in 2010.

=== Tickle-U (2005–2006) ===
Tickle-U was Cartoon Network's first attempt at an official weekday-morning preschool programming block, premiering on 22 August 2005, and aired from 9 to 11 a.m. ET/PT. Programs on the line-up included acquired shows such as two Teletoon/Treehouse TV series, with one being a co-production (Harry and His Bucket Full of Dinosaurs and Gerald McBoing-Boing), and British shows (Gordon the Garden Gnome, Peppa Pig, Little Robots, and Yoko! Jakamoko! Toto!). Unlike their original counterparts, the British-acquired shows featured an American voice cast. The only original series was Firehouse Tales, produced by Warner Bros. Animation. It featured domestic and foreign-imported series targeted at preschool-age children similar to its competitors Nick Jr. (on Nickelodeon) and Playhouse Disney (now Disney Jr. on Disney Channel). The hosts were two animated CGI characters: a red butterfly-like creature named Pipoca (voiced by Ariel Winter) and a yellow rabbit-like creature named Henderson (voiced by Tom Kenny). The block was criticized by the CCFC for its marketing strategies. After Tickle-U closed on 13 January 2006, some of its series still aired on Cartoon Network until 2007, and as part of the schedule of the British variation of Cartoonito. The promos for the shows featured on the block had Tickle-U branding and the mascot interstitials were replaced with shots of the main view of the City of Townsville from The Powerpuff Girls (part of Cartoon Network's on-air presentation from 2004 to 2007). It was the last attempt at a preschool programming block for Cartoon Network in the U.S. until Cartoonito in 2021, on both Cartoon Network and HBO Max.

== History ==
=== Launch (2006–2011) ===
The first variation of the original logo was used from 2006 to 2018. The eye dots were originally a dark purple.

On 4 September 2006, Cartoon Network Too debuted a programming block called Cartoonito, running from 6:00 a.m. to 3:00 p.m. daily. The series featured in Cartoonito was acquired from countries worldwide and was available in both English and French. The block was later spun off into a separate channel on 24 May 2007, as Cartoonito expanded its broadcast hours by airing on the whole daytime slot formerly given to Cartoon Network Too. In turn, Cartoon Network Too became a 24-hour channel, replacing Toonami UK's former channel space. From September 2009 to March 2010, a morning Cartoonito block aired on Boomerang until its launch on Virgin Media.

=== Brand expansion (2011–2021) ===
The second variant of the original logo was used from 2018 to 2022. The text logo is slightly curved and the eye dots were pitch black.

In May 2011, Turner Broadcasting System EMEA announced that they would expand the Cartoonito brand to EMEA and MENA territories; under the arrangement, programming blocks would launch on Cartoon Network or Boomerang channels in that region. The announcement coincided with Turner Broadcasting System EMEA acquiring the pay television rights to the CGI animated revival of Bananas in Pyjamas and Spanish computer-animated series Jelly Jamm, both of which would be flagship shows for the blocks.

The brand expansion began with the launch of a free-to-air Cartoonito channel in Italy, which launched on 22 August 2011, as a sister channel to Boing through a joint-venture with Mediaset. In September 2011, Cartoonito replaced Boomerang in Spain, and had launched as a block on Boomerang's EMEA and MENA feeds on the same day. The block launched in the Middle East on Cartoon Network Arabic on 4 September and in France on Boing on 5 September 2011. On 1 December 2012, Cartoonito launched in the Asia-Pacific and the Philippines through Sky Cable. Cartoonito is available as part of its Metropack and on an a la carte basis via Skycable Select.

The expansion of the brand was eventually reduced by the mid-2010s. The French block had become unpopular with viewers and suffered a reduction of its airtime in September 2012, before being removed from Boing all together on 5 July 2013. The Spanish channel closed on 30 June 2013, alongside the Spanish feed of Cartoon Network due to declining ratings and a pay television crisis with all programmes moving to their free-to-air Boing network, which they co-own with Mediaset. The MENA blocks ended at the beginning of January and April 2014, respectively, while the Asian channel was replaced with a relaunched Boomerang on 1 January 2015.

=== Global reintroduction and rebrand (2021–present) ===
After the announcement of Batwheels on 6 October 2020, Warner Bros. Global Kids, Young Adults and Classics president Tom Ascheim implied about plans for Cartoon Network to attract a preschool audience. On 5 February 2021, Ascheim announced in an interview with Kidscreen that Cartoon Network would expand its offerings to include series aimed at family audiences, girls, and preschoolers, with the preschool audience putting the network in competition with established preschool brands such as Disney Junior, PBS Kids and Nick Jr. He would also announce the acquisition of the broadcast rights to the Thomas & Friends reboot series, Thomas & Friends: All Engines Go.

==== United States ====
On 17 February 2021, it was announced that WarnerMedia's international preschool brand Cartoonito would launch in the United States on Cartoon Network and streaming service HBO Max. Over 20 series were in development at the time of the announcement. A website for the block was launched in March 2021. Partnerships included acquired broadcasting rights to Thomas & Friends: All Engines Go, a reboot of the original Thomas & Friends series. The block launched on 13 September 2021, and initially ran for eight hours (6:00 a.m. to 2:00 p.m. ET/PT) on weekdays and two hours (6:00 a.m. to 8:00 a.m. ET/PT) on weekends. It was later reduced to four to five hours only on weekdays (starting at 7:00 a.m. ET/PT). The block continued to reduce its airtime until its closure on 23 May 2025.

==== Latin America ====
In October 2021, Sky Brasil announced that Cartoonito would be launching in Brazil on 1 December 2021, replacing Boomerang. A few days later, the Argentine pay television service Telered announced the replacement of Boomerang to Cartoonito for the rest of Latin America on the same date.

==== EMEA (Europe, Middle East, and Africa) ====
In May 2021, WarnerMedia UK and EMEA announced plans to relaunch Cartoonito within their region.

===== Rebrand in the UK and Ireland =====
On 1 February 2022, the British and Irish Cartoonito channel adopted the worldwide rebrand. Additionally, starting on 1 March 2022, a weekday hour-long Cartoonito block aired from 9:00 a.m. to 10:00 a.m. on sister channel Cartoon Network. The block was later expanded to an hour from 9:00 a.m. to 11:00 a.m. on weekdays and did not air during the school holidays.

===== Rebrand in Italy =====
On 5 June 2022, the Italian Cartoonito channel adopted the worldwide rebrand, making it one of the last Cartoonito-branded channels to replace Cartoonito's original CGI mascots, The Cartoonitos.

===== Other EMEA Regions =====
In the Nordics, Cartoonito launched as a programming block on Boomerang on 1 February 2022. The channel later rebranded as Cartoonito on 4 September 2023, as did Boomerang's feeds in Turkey and the MENA region. Beginning on 7 February 2022, the Cartoonito blocks on Cartoon Network Arabic and Cartoon Network Turkey adopted the rebrand. In Portugal, a morning and afternoon Cartoonito block launched on Boomerang on 21 February 2022. The channel would rebrand as Cartoonito on 23 March 2023.

In Africa, Boomerang relaunched its morning Cartoonito block on 4 April 2022. On 8 February 2023, it was announced that Cartoonito would expand into a full-time channel and replace Boomerang on 25 March. In Central and Eastern Europe, Germany, and the Netherlands, Boomerang relaunched its morning Cartoonito block on 1 September 2022. In January 2023, it was announced that Boomerang CEE would be replaced with a standalone Cartoonito channel on 18 March 2023. In France, Boing was replaced by a Cartoonito channel on 3 April 2023.

==== APAC (Asia-Pacific) ====
In Japan, the Cartoonito block was launched on 1 March 2022 on Cartoon Network as a morning block. In Southeast Asia, Hong Kong, Taiwan and Korea, Cartoonito relaunched as a programming block on 28 March 2022 on Cartoon Network. It featured a modern approach to preschool programming, made to support each child's unique potential with its educational framework called "Humancentric Learning". In Australia and New Zealand, a Cartoonito block launched on 27 June 2022 on Cartoon Network. A dedicated Cartoonito pop-up channel was available on Australia's Foxtel starting on 10 March 2023.

On 2 May 2022, an additional Cartoonito block launched on Boomerang Asia. Later, on 21 November, Cartoon Network discontinued its Cartoonito block, with the brand fully shifting to Boomerang. Cartoonito continues to air on Cartoon Network Philippines. On 28 June 2023, Warner Bros. Discovery Asia-Pacific announced that Boomerang Asia would be rebrand as Cartoonito, which occurred a month later on 28 July, marking the second time Cartoonito appeared as a linear channel in the region. On 1 July 2024, the South Korean version of Boomerang, which was launched in 2015, was rebranded as Cartoonito.

== Mascots ==
=== The Cartoonitos (2006–2022) ===
From its initial launch, Cartoonito's original six CGI mascots included Cuba (a red cube), Lolly (a purple cylinder), Ringo (a green ring), Spike (a blue pyramid), Ting (a pink star), and Bubble (a yellow sphere). They were called The Cartoonitos. Maria Darling voiced Cuba, Lolly, and Ringo, while Shelley Longworth voiced Spike, Ting, and Bubble in the UK. Initially, in the UK, Bubble, Spike and Ting spoke French and taught French phrases to viewers. The mascots were discontinued in the UK in February 2022, and in Italy in June 2022, as they adopted the rebranding.

=== Rebrand (2021–present) ===
As part of Cartoonito's global reintroduction, the original CGI mascots were replaced by four 2D-animated mascots. The mascots are Nito (a cyan square), Glob (a multi-colored glob-like figure), Wedge (a magenta triangle), and Itty (a pink circle). These characters were exclusive to the U.S. and Latin American feeds in 2021, until the British, Irish, and Italian feeds adopted them in 2022.

== See also ==
- Cartoon Network (international channels)
- Cartoonito (international channels)
- Boomerang
- Tiny TV, a former international brand block for Turner Europe.
