= Cartoon Network (Middle East and Africa) =

Middle Eastern TV channel

- Third and current logo, used since 7 December 2010
- Broadcast area: MENA; Sub-Saharan Africa; Greece; Cyprus; Turkey
- Headquarters: London, United Kingdom

Programming
- Languages: English (MENA and Africa feeds); Arabic (MENA feed only); Greek (MENA feed only, continuity and bumpers in English)
- Picture format: 1080i HDTV

Ownership
- Owner: Skydance Corporation
- Sister channels: List: Cartoonito TNT Africa CNN International Cartoon Network Arabic Cartoon Network Hindi Boing Discovery Channel Investigation Discovery Real Time TLC Food Network Travel Channel

History
- Launched: 17 September 1993; 33 years ago (as Cartoon Network Europe); 15 October 1999; 26 years ago (as independent feed); 1 July 2016; 10 years ago (launch of Cartoon Network MENA)
- Former names: Cartoon Network EMEA (1999–2011); Cartoon Network Pan-Feed (2011–2020); Cartoon Network Pan-European (2020–2021)

Links
- Website: MENA language-switcher site (in English and Arabic); Middle East website (in English); Africa website Greece website

Availability

Terrestrial
- DStv: Channel 301 (Cartoon Network Africa)
- GOtv: Channel 89 (Cartoon Network Africa)
- Azam TV (East Africa): Channel 226 (Cartoon Network Africa)
- beIN: Channel 622 (Cartoon Network MENA)
- OSN: Channel 45 (Cartoon Network MENA)

Cartoon Network is one of two digital children's television channels that air animated series: Cartoon Network MENA, which serves the Middle East and North Africa division along with Greece and Cyprus; and Cartoon Network Africa (formerly known as Cartoon Network EMEA), which, as of 2016, exclusively serves Sub-Saharan Africa. Both feeds are owned by Skydance Corporation under its International division.

The network began as part of the larger UK/pan-European service on 17 September 1993; the UK branch would separate itself in October 1999, but kept a nearly identical schedule until August 2001.

Cartoon Network EMEA used to share channel space with TNT Africa; the latter would air from 21:00 to 06:00 CET, while the former would run for the rest of the day.

On 1 July 2016, an HD feed on beIN and OSNtv known as Cartoon Network MENA was launched, replacing Cartoon Network Africa in the MENA region. It features both English and Arabic audio tracks. In addition to being offered by various Gulf IPTV providers (as well as Cablevision in Lebanon and most Cypriot TV providers except for Nova), Cartoon Network MENA also has a different management team, different branding and a fully separate schedule from Cartoon Network Africa.

== History ==
First logo, used from 17 September 1993 to 20 April 2006.

On September 17, 1993, Cartoon Network Europe began broadcasting from the Astra 1C satellites for Central Europe and Intelsat 707 for Eastern Europe. Broadcasting was carried out from 5:00 to 19:00, and the TNT UK channel was broadcast in the evening. Initially, the channel was legally called Cartoon Network Europe, and it also featured several soundtracks in the following languages: English, Spanish, Swedish, Danish, French and Italian.

At first, Cartoon Network broadcast cartoons from Warner Bros, MGM and Hanna-Barbera, such as: Looney Tunes, Merrie Melodies and Tom and Jerry. A few years later, it began broadcasting its own animated series: The Powerpuff Girls, Dexter's Laboratory, etc. As a result, most of the programs from Warner Bros. were relegated to the background, and the original animated series took up most of the air. The channel was panned in France and Belgium where, although it had a French track since launch, it came at a time where there was much criticism of the American cultural scene invading France, leading to the channel being blocked from cable companies, as well as lack of European programming. By 1996, the channel had complied to such quotas and, combined with TNT, now gave 20% of its total air time to series produced in European Union countries, especially the United Kingdom and France.

In August 1996, Cartoon Network increased the broadcast time to 21:00, and in December of the same year switched to round-the-clock broadcasting.

On 15 October 1999, Cartoon Network Europe was renamed Cartoon Network UK, and became available only for the UK, Ireland and Malta. The TV channel switched to paid TV broadcasting, and was encrypted on Astra 1C using VideoCrypt. For Europe, Africa and the Middle East, Cartoon Network EMEA was launched, which was free and transitional, as Turner began to localize its channels across Europe. Cartoon Network EMEA copied Cartoon Network UK's schedule until 2001, but there were exceptions: shows such as Dragon Ball Z and Angela Anaconda were not broadcast, as there were no pan-European broadcast rights.

Cartoon Network was made available in Israel in 2000. Cable operator Matav and satellite operator Yes started carrying the channel in June 2000, followed by Tevel in early May 2001 and Golden Channels at the middle of the month. All of the programming was in English with no translation in Hebrew. Following the closure of the localized Dutch feed on 1 August 2001, it was replaced by the EMEA feed.

In Uzbekistan, the channel was available on MMDS operator Kamalak TV. Individual users received the combined CN-TNT service, while collective users received a special feed where the company's in-house entertainment channel TV-29 was inserted, creating a triple timeshare.

In April 2005, Cartoon Network was completely dubbed into Russian, and Greek subtitles were added on 20 June 2005.

Second logo, used from 21 April 2006 to 6 December 2010.

HOT removed Cartoon Network on 26 November 2005 after accusations from Turner that the company's offerings were "cheap and recycled", and that Cartoon Network didn't invest in the Israeli market to remain competitive. The removal of the Tom and Jerry theatricals in June that year, one of the most popular shows on the channel in Israel at the time, led to a downfall in viewers. The channel was later removed from Yes on 28 December 2009, being replaced by JimJam, and as consequence the channel (but not the brand) was withdrawn from the Israeli market.

In 2011, Cartoon Network EMEA was renamed to Cartoon Network Pan Feed.

Cartoon Network switched to widescreen on 6 October 2014, and also rebranded with the CHECK It 3.0 graphics package on that same day.

On 1 July 2016, a dedicated feed for the MENA region launched, which replaced the African channel in the Arab world, broadcasting in 1080i HD with a soundtrack in Arabic. The channel has a different schedule, program composition and censorship rules (sometimes scenes that are not affected in the Arabic feed are edited). It is also offered with Greek subtitles in Cyprus.

Cartoon Network MENA's English-language website can be found at CartoonNetworkME.com, Another site, CartoonNetworkMENA.com, launched around the same time and serves as a hub where users can choose between the English- or Arabic-language versions.

Since 10 November 2020, Boomerang has received a Czech license (RRTV) in order to ensure the continuation of legal broadcasting in the European Union in accordance with the EU Directive on Audiovisual Media Services (AVMSD) and the law on the single market after the UK leaves the European Union. Since the Czech Republic has minimum broadcasting rules, it was chosen for licensing purposes in the EU. Cartoon Network Pan Feed was renamed Cartoon Network Pan-European, and later renamed Cartoon Network MENA again. The channel's broadcasting center is still located in London.

In an interview with C21 in May 2021, WarnerMedia EMEA mentioned that they're looking to add programs for girls and family which consist of live-action and animated series.

Sometime in January–February 2025, a Greek track was introduced to the channel with some shows including dubs, continuity and bumpers remaining in English.

In November 2025, it was reported that Cartoon Network alongside the company's 11 other TV channels might be exiting DStv and GOtv due to a carriage dispute with MultiChoice. Despite this development, a Zulu track was added for The Wonderfully Weird World of Gumball in December. Ultimately, the channel was kept on DStv after a last-minute carriage agreement.

== Sister channels ==
=== Boing ===
Boing is a television channel that airs repeats of programs formerly seen on Cartoon Network and Boomerang. It launched on 30 May 2015, as the fourth extension of Turner's larger Boing brand.

=== Cartoonito ===
Cartoonito is a television channel that airs cartoons for preschoolers. Two versions of the channel exist; one for the Arab World, Greece and Cyprus (Cartoonito MENA), and another for Sub-Saharan Africa (Cartoonito Africa). It originally launched on 5 June 2005 as Boomerang EMEA.

On 1 July 2016, Boomerang MENA was launched, replacing the African feed in the Middle East and North Africa; it airs in 1080i with English and Arabic audio tracks on beIN, and is also available in Greece and Cyprus, albeit with a Greek audio track.

The morning Cartoonito block, which was previously featured between 2011 and 2014, was relaunched on 4 April 2022. On 25 March 2023, the African channel rebranded to Cartoonito completely, with the MENA channel following suit on 4 September.

=== Toonami ===
Toonami is a television channel catered towards young adults consisting of DC animation from Batman, Superman and Young Justice. It launched in 2017 on Kwesé TV until the platform went defunct in 2019. Then it was made available on Cell C's defunct streaming service Black for that same year.

In March 2020, the channel was revived as a 2-month pop-up channel on DStv thereafter it was made available full-time on the StarTimes platform after its closure. As of March 2021, Toonami can also be found on Canal+, Intelvision, Azam TV and Zuku TV.

== See also ==
- Cartoon Network around the world
- TNT Africa
- List of programs broadcast by Cartoon Network
