= Cartoon Network Hindi =

Hindi-language children's television channel

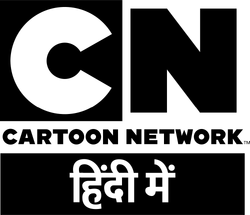
- Country: United Arab Emirates
- Broadcast area: India; UAE
- Headquarters: Dubai, United Arab Emirates

Programming
- Language: Hindi
- Picture format: 1080i HDTV

Ownership
- Owner: Skydance Corporation
- Sister channels: Cartoon Network Arabic; Cartoon Network MENA; Cartoonito MENA; Turner Classic Movies; CNN International; HLN

History
- Launched: 1 April 2016; 10 years ago

Cartoon Network Hindi (often abbreviated as CN हिंदी में) is an Emirati Hindi-language children's television channel targeted towards 4 to 14 year old South Asian expatriate children in the Arab countries, operated by Skydance Corporation. As the name implies, the channel broadcasts exclusively in Hindi, which is akin to the Turner's Arabic language children's television channel, Cartoon Network Arabic.

== History ==
It is the first Hindi-language children's television channel in the Middle East and North Africa. TBS launched Cartoon Network Hindi on April 1, 2016 exclusively on beIN Network satellite television platform. It primarily broadcasts animated programming from both the original American network and the Indian feed.

On January 12, 2017, the channel converted to full HD (1080i), in addition to rebranding to the Dimensional branding package.

On January 1, 2024, Cartoon Network Hindi was no longer available on BeIN (what was the channel's main provider), but the channel is still available on du in the United Arab Emirates.
