= Cartoon Network Arabic =

Arabic-language feed of Cartoon Network EMEA

Cartoon Network Arabic كرتون نتورك بالعربية
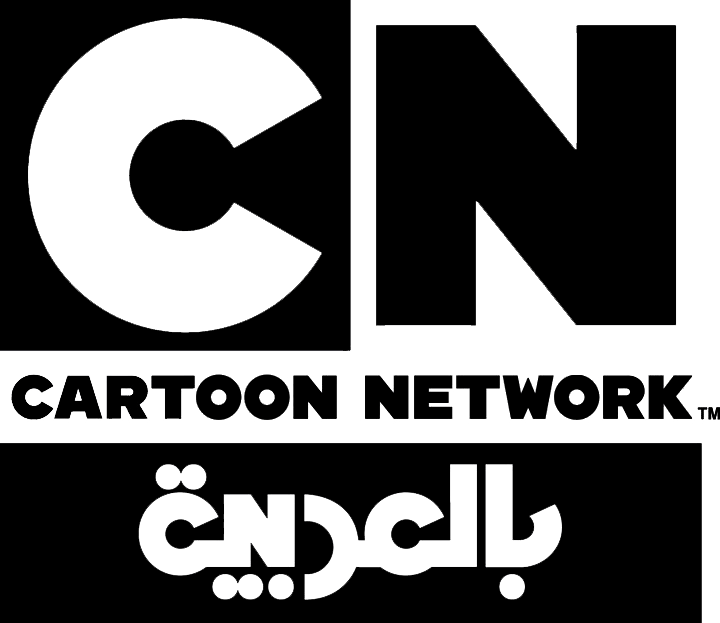
- Country: United Arab Emirates; United Kingdom
- Broadcast area: Arab world
- Headquarters: Great Marlborough Street, London, United Kingdom (Turner Broadcasting System EMEA); Dubai Media City, United Arab Emirates (Turner Broadcasting System Arabia FZ-LLC)

Programming
- Language: Arabic
- Picture format: 16:9 (1080i, HDTV) (downscaled to 16:9 576i for the SDTV feed)
- Timeshift service: Cartoon Network Arabic +2 (defunct as of 2016)

Ownership
- Owner: Skydance
- Sister channels: Turner Classic Movies; Cartoonito MENA; Cartoon Network MENA; Cartoon Network Hindi; CNN International; HLN

History
- Launched: 10 October 2010; 16 years ago
- Former names: Cartoon Network

Links
- Website: Official website MENA language website (English and Arabic)

Cartoon Network Arabic (Arabic: كرتون نتورك بالعربية, as known CN Arabia) is a pan-Arab free-to-air children's television channel that is broadcast to Arab audiences in the Middle East and North Africa. It is one of two Arabic-language versions of the original Cartoon Network, the other being a pay television channel on beIN, OSN and additional providers known as Cartoon Network MENA, which is available in both English and Arabic.

The channel launched on 10 October 2010, coinciding with the opening of Turner Broadcasting System Europe's offices in Dubai Media City. As of 2026, it is managed by Skydance Corporation under its international division.

The standard channel broadcasts via Arabsat Badr 6 and Nilesat. Cartoon Network Arabic is considered a free-to-air alternative to Cartoon Network MENA and Cartoonito MENA, two pay TV channels offered in the Arab world in HD and in both English and Arabic on beIN Network and additional providers since 1 July 2016, despite the varying differences in programming, schedules, and available languages.

== History ==
Cartoon Network Arabic was launched on 10 October 2010 at 10:10 am GST. The channel's launch coincided with the opening of Turner Broadcasting System's offices in Dubai Media City, UAE, which is where the channel's local owner is located.

In December 2015, Turner Broadcasting System entered an exclusivity deal with the Qatar-based beIN Media Group. This deal led to Cartoon Network Africa, Boomerang Africa, and TCM moving from OSN to the latter's beIN Network service, and also caused the HD feed on YahLive to shut down; the actual channel, however, is unaffected due to being a free-to-air channel on Nilesat and Arabsat/Badr. Cartoon Network Arabic was added to beIN as channel 138 as an HD channel, although the HD version was later replaced with the SD version on Arabsat/Badr. CNN International HD was removed from My-HD's channel list and moved to beIN as an encrypted HD channel along with the pay-only HLN, which is in letterboxed SD, but CNN continues to remain available as a free-to-air channel on Nilesat and Arabsat/Badr in SD. However, subscribers to Etisalat and du's IPTV services in the UAE were virtually unaffected at the time. However, due to their direct relations with Turner, UAE Telecoms, Etisalat and Du continue to offer these channels to IPTV subscribers.

== Era Names ==
- 2010–2014: CHECK it 1.0 Era
- 2014–2017: CHECK it 3.0 Era
- 2017–Present: Dimensional Era

== Arabic version of Cartoonito ==
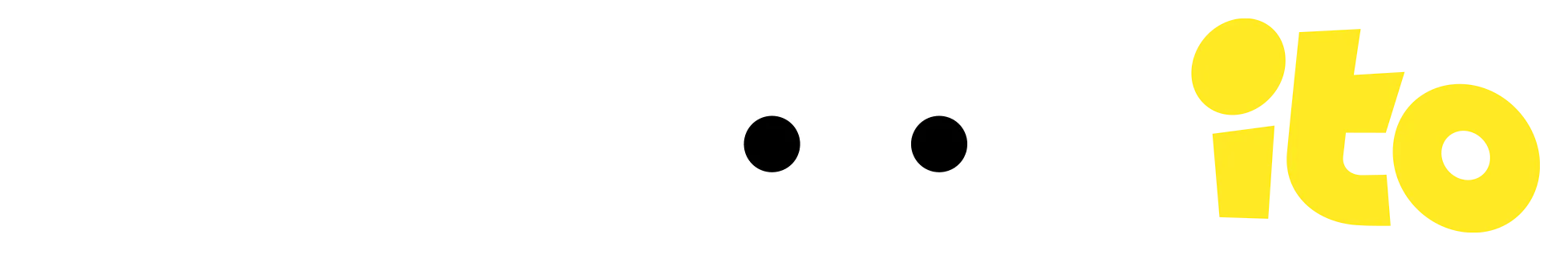
Cartoonito's official logo (2020–2022)

Cartoonito's official logo from since 2022

In 2011, Turner Broadcasting System Europe had announced that it would roll out its UK-based preschoolers' channel Cartoonito across Europe, the Middle East and Africa, increasing the brand's distribution to 125 million homes in 112 territories. On Cartoon Network Arabic, Cartoonito was launched as a morning block broadcast every day starting from 4 September 2011. However, the block was phased out on 1 April 2014, with some of its shows no longer available.

On 6 February 2022, Cartoonito rebranded with the new 2021 logo and bumpers alongside its Turkish counterpart as part of the brand's Global re-introduction.

== Other versions and related channels ==
=== Cartoon Network Arabic HD ===
In March 2012, Cartoon Network Arabic became available in true high-definition via the YahLive service. The channel was eventually moved under beIN Network's service after the exclusivity deal was in effect in January 2016. In May 2016, the channel was suspended in favor of Cartoon Network MENA and Boomerang MENA that were later launched in July that year, as they both feature an Arabic audio track. until Cartoon Network Arabic HD return this time in Badr 26

=== Cartoon Network Hindi ===
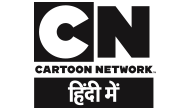
Logo of Cartoon Network Hindi

On 1 April 2016, Qatar-based beIN Media Group, in association with Turner Broadcasting System Arabia, launched Cartoon Network Hindi exclusively via beIN. Cartoon Network Hindi provides children's animated programming to most South Asian expatriates in Arab World countries outside of India. As the name implies, the channel is only available in Hindi, which is akin to the Arab World's own pan-aired channel.
