= Cartoon Network (Turkey) =

Turkish cable satellite channel

- Country: Turkey
- Broadcast area: Turkey; Northern Cyprus
- Network: Eda Televizyon Yayıncılık ve Prodüksiyon A.Ş.
- Headquarters: Istanbul, Turkey

Programming
- Languages: Turkish; English (available in SAP with translated continuity)
- Picture format: 1080i (16:9 HDTV)

Ownership
- Owner: Skydance Corporation
- Sister channels: Cartoonito; CNN Türk

History
- Launched: 28 January 2008; 18 years ago
- Replaced: Cartoon Network Europe (Turkey)

Availability

Streaming media
- Turkcell TV+: Channel 112
- Tivibu: Channel 121
- D-Smart: Channel 120

Cartoon Network is a Turkish free-to-air television channel that mainly broadcasts cartoons. It is run by Skydance Corporation under its EMEA division. The channel primarily airs animated programming.

== History ==
The channel launched on 28 January 2008.

On 4 April 2011, the channel rebranded with the CHECK IT 1.0 package. Around this time, it also began to play movie sponsorships for The Smurfs and Arthur Christmas.

On 1 January 2015, the channel rebranded itself with new graphics (CHECK IT 3.0). One year later, on 6 October 2016, the channel switched from 4:3 to 16:9 aspect ratio. On 1 January 2017, Cartoon Network started to use graphics from Cartoon Network USA's Dimensional 2016 rebrand package. On November 3, 2026, a transition to 1080i HDTV broadcasting was made on the same frequency.

== See also ==
- Cartoonito (brand as a whole)
- List of international Cartoon Network channels
- List of programs broadcast by Boomerang
- List of programs broadcast by Cartoonito
