= Tiny TV =

Children's television program brand

- Network: Cartoon Network; Boomerang; Pogo
- Launched: 27 January 2003; 23 years ago (India); 3 April 2006; 20 years ago (Latin America)
- Closed: 4 October 2008; 18 years ago (Latin America); 2011; 15 years ago (India & taiwan); 1 December 2012; 13 years ago (Australia)
- Country of origin: Australia; India; Latin America; Scandinavia; South Korea; Southeast Asia; Taiwan
- Owner: Turner Broadcasting System
- Format: Weekday morning children's programming block

Tiny TV was a brand name used by Turner Broadcasting for a slate of international programming blocks targeting preschool children. The block primarily aired on Cartoon Network in regions such as Australia, India, Scandinavia (under the name Lilletoon), South Korea (under the name 꼬마 TV), and Taiwan (under the name 小小TV). Tiny TV was also broadcast on Boomerang in Latin America (under the name Mini TV) and Southeast Asia, as well as Pogo TV in India.

== History ==
=== Origins on Cartoon Network and Pogo (2003–2011) ===
Tiny TV was conceived by Turner Broadcasting System India as a dedicated preschool programming brand for Cartoon Network, responding to internal research that identified the under-six demographic as a substantial but underserved audience segment. Turner senior vice president Ian Diamond announced the block's purpose as familiarizing toddlers with social concepts such as cooperation, sibling rivalry, a "can-do" attitude, and the importance of family and friends.

The block debuted on 27 January 2003, airing weekdays from 11:00 AM to 2:00 PM and weekends from 10:30 AM to 12:00 PM. Its flagship launch title was a localized version of Make Way for Noddy, based on Enid Blyton's storybook character, which combined ten minutes of animation per episode with twelve minutes of live-action footage filmed with Indian children. Accompanying series at launch included Bob the Builder, Pingu, Kipper, and Oswald, all of which were positioned by Turner as providing a "safe and positive environment" for viewers aged two to six.

Following the launch of Pogo TV in 2004 as Turner's dedicated children's network in India, the Tiny TV block moved from Cartoon Network to Pogo, where it continued airing in a bilingual English-Hindi format meant to broaden accessibility across urban and rural households. The block aired on Pogo through the mid-2000s, and on 5 July 2010, it was formally relaunched on the channel after a period of reduced presence. Tiny TV remained on Pogo until 2011, when it was quietly retired as Turner began transitioning its international preschool strategy toward the Cartoonito brand.

=== Expansion throughout Eurasia and Oceania (2003–2006) ===
During the mid-2000s, Turner rolled out localized versions of Tiny TV across multiple Cartoon Network feeds, adapting the block's name and programming lineup to suit each market. In Scandinavia, the block aired on Cartoon Network under the name Lilletoon and included locally produced and European titles such as Rasmus Klump, Hugo the Jungle Animal, and Pocoyo. South Korea aired it under the name 꼬마 TV (Kkoma TV, roughly translating to "Little TV"), featuring Korean co-productions such as Pororo the Little Penguin and Cocomong alongside international imports.

In Southeast Asia, Tiny TV aired on both Cartoon Network and Boomerang, with both the former's Taiwanese sub-feed (branded 小小TV; Xiǎo Xiǎo TV, also translating to "Little TV") and Philippine autonomous feed carrying region-specific titles. The cross-network approach also applied to the Cartoon Network and Boomerang feeds in Australia and New Zealand, which featured additional titles including Baby Looney Tunes, Franklin, and Strawberry Shortcake.

==== Latin American Mini TV block (2006–2008) ====
On 3 April 2006, Boomerang's Latin American feed underwent a significant relaunch, transforming from a classic-animation–focused service into a broader children's entertainment network, and adopted a visual identity closely resembling that of Pogo TV in India. As part of this relaunch, a variation of the Tiny TV block was introduced to Boomerang's daytime lineup under the name Mini TV. The Latin American Mini TV block was notable for being among the first outlets to broadcast Peppa Pig with a Latin American Spanish dub, recorded in Venezuela. The bumpers and interstitials for Mini TV were voiced by actress Danna Paola, who also served as announcer for the wider Boomerang Latin America morning block during the same period.

Mini TV was discontinued on 4 October 2008, coinciding with Boomerang's second major relaunch, which shifted the channel toward a teen-oriented format and moved all classic animation content to the newly launched Tooncast channel.

=== Branding and presentation ===
Across all of its regional feeds, Tiny TV maintained a consistent visual identity built around cartoon-style mascots taking the form of TV-headed robots, which appeared in interstitial bumpers between programs. Each regional feed adapted its own on-air presentation and localized title sequence, though the shared mascot concept gave the brand a recognizable cross-regional identity. Programming was selected to emphasize gentle, educational narratives suitable for the two-to-six age bracket, with an emphasis on themes such as friendship, problem-solving, and everyday social skills.

=== Discontinuation (2011–2012) ===
By 2011, Turner Broadcasting had begun preparing Cartoonito — originally a British preschool channel — for global expansion as the company's unified international preschool brand. As Cartoonito rolled out across Cartoon Network and Boomerang feeds worldwide, the remaining Tiny TV feeds were wound down. The Indian and Taiwanese feeds ended in 2011, while the Australian Boomerang feed, the last to remain active, concluded on 1 December 2012. Cartoonito subsequently replaced Tiny TV as Turner's principal international preschool offering, eventually expanding to Latin America, Southeast Asia, South Korea, and numerous other markets where Tiny TV had previously operated.

== Programming ==
=== Australian feeds ===
==== Cartoon Network ====
- The Adventures of Bottle Top Bill and His Best Friend Corky
- Dragon Tales
- Gordon the Garden Gnome
- Little Red Tractor
- Merlin the Magical Puppy
- Postman Pat
- The Secret World of Benjamin Bear

==== Boomerang ====
- The Adventures of Bottle Top Bill and His Best Friend Corky
- Baby Looney Tunes
- Franklin
- Gerald McBoing-Boing
- Guess with Jess
- Little Red Tractor
- Madeline
- Meteor and the Mighty Monster Trucks
- Ozie Boo
- Paddington Bear
- Pippi Longstocking
- Postman Pat
- Strawberry Shortcake
- The Adventures of Chuck & Friends
- The Secret World of Benjamin Bear

=== Indian feed ===
==== Cartoon Network ====
- A Pup Named Scooby-Doo
- Baby Looney Tunes
- The Backyardigans
- Bob the Builder
- Boo!
- Dragon Tales
- Ethelbert the Tiger
- Franklin
- Little Red Tractor
- Kipper
- The Koala Brothers
- Maisy
- Make Way for Noddy
- Oswald
- Pingu
- Postman Pat
- Rubbadubbers
- Teletubbies
- Thomas & Friends
- Tom & Jerry Kids

==== Pogo ====
- 64 Zoo Lane
- Babar
- Baby Looney Tunes
- Barney & Friends
- Bob the Builder
- Boohbah
- Caillou
- Care Bears: Adventures in Care-a-lot
- Dragon Tales
- Ethelbert the Tiger
- Fimbles
- Franny's Feet
- Gordon the Garden Gnome
- Harry and his Bucketful of Dinosaurs
- Hi-5
- Kipper
- Little Red Tractor
- Little Robots
- Miffy and Friends
- Make Way for Noddy
- Noddy's Toyland Adventures
- Oswald
- Pingu
- Postman Pat
- Raa Raa the Noisy Lion
- Teletubbies
- The Secret World of Benjamin Bear
- Tiny Planets
- The Backyardigans
- The Flintstone Kids
- The Adventures of Bottle Top Bill and His Best Friend Corky
- Thomas & Friends
- Tweenies
- Twipsy

=== Latin American feed (Mini TV) ===
- The Adventures of Bottle Top Bill and His Best Friend Corky
- Angelina Ballerina
- Arthur
- Baby Looney Tunes
- Bellflower Bunnies
- The Berenstain Bears
- Betty Toons
- Busytown Mysteries
- Care Bears
- Cave Kids
- Curious George
- Dive Olly Dive!
- Dragon
- Eckhart
- Ellen's Acres
- Faireez
- Firehouse Tales
- The Flintstone Kids
- The Forgotten Toys
- Fortune Dogs
- Franklin
- Franny's Feet
- Garfield and Friends
- Gerald McBoing-Boing
- Hamtaro
- Hello Kitty's Paradise
- Kangaroo Creek Gang
- Kipper
- The Land Before Time
- The Little Lulu Show
- The Magic School Bus
- Maisy
- Maya & Miguel
- Max & Ruby
- Meteor and the Mighty Monster Trucks
- Miffy and Friends
- Miss Spider's Sunny Patch Friends
- Mona the Vampire
- The Neverending Story
- Ned's Newt
- Pecola
- Peppa Pig
- Postcards from Buster
- Preston Pig
- Sagwa, the Chinese Siamese Cat
- Tom & Jerry Kids
- Tom and Jerry Tales
- Toopy and Binoo
- Tracey McBean
- Tractor Tom
- The Triplets
- The Upside Down Show
- Viva Piñata
- Woofy

=== Southeast Asian feeds ===
==== Cartoon Network ====
- A Pup Named Scooby-Doo
- Baby Looney Tunes
- The Flintstone Kids
- Krypto the Superdog
- Paddington Bear
- Tom & Jerry Kids

=== Philippine feed ===
==== Cartoon Network ====
- The Adventures of Bottle Top Bill and His Best Friend Corky
- A Pup Named Scooby-Doo
- Baby Looney Tunes
- Bob the Builder
- Care Bears
- Firehouse Tales
- The Flintstone Kids
- Gombby's Green Island
- Gordon the Garden Gnome
- Krypto the Superdog
- The Land Before Time
- The Little Lulu Show
- Little People
- Little Red Tractor
- Loopdidoo
- Oswald
- Peep and the Big Wide World
- Pingu
- Postman Pat
- Strawberry Shortcake: Berry Bitty Adventures
- Stuart Little: The Animated Series
- Thomas & Friends
- Tom & Jerry Kids
- Wow! Wow! Wubbzy!

=== Taiwanese feed (小小TV) ===
- The Adventures of Bottle Top Bill and His Best Friend Corky
- Angelina Ballerina
- Bo on the Go!
- Care Bears
- Firehouse Tales
- Fireman Sam
- Franny's Feet
- Guess with Jess
- Harry and his Bucketful of Dinosaurs
- Hello Kitty
- Little Red Tractor
- Oswald
- Pinky Dinky Doo
- Postman Pat

=== Scandinavian feed (Lilletoon) ===
- Arthur
- Care Bears
- Jungledyret Hugo (Hugo the Jungle Animal)
- The Koala Brothers
- Make Way for Noddy
- Merlin the Magical Puppy
- Mumble Bumble
- Pocoyo
- Rasmus Klump
- Skipper & Skeeto
- Strawberry Shortcake
- Troll Tales

=== South Korean feed (꼬마 TV) ===
- The Adventures of Bottle Top Bill and His Best Friend Corky
- The Adventures of Paddington Bear
- Baby Looney Tunes
- Bo on the Go!
- Care Bears: Adventures in Care-a-lot
- Chiro and Friends
- Cocomong
- Colorful Crayon
- Curucuru and Friends
- Charlie and Lola
- Gofrette
- Hana's Helpline
- Hello Kitty's Paradise
- Hooray For Fish!
- The Koala Brothers
- Lunar Jim
- Oswald
- PICME
- Pingu
- Pororo the Little Penguin
- Postman Pat
- Tobias Totz and his Lion

== See also ==
- Tickle-U
- Cartoonito
