= Emma Lahana =

New Zealand actress (born c. 1984)

- Born: Emma Kate Lahana c. 1984 (age 41–42); Auckland, New Zealand
- Occupation: Actress
- Years active: 2000–2013, 2018–present
- Children: 2

Emma Kate Lahana (born c. 1984) is a New Zealand actress. She is known for her roles as Kira Ford, the Yellow Dino Ranger, in Power Rangers Dino Thunder, Jennifer Mason on Haven, and Brigid O'Reilly in Cloak & Dagger.

== Career ==
Lahana earned her first credited role when playing Erin Kingston, a supporting role on the New Zealand TV drama Shortland Street. She later portrayed Fiona in the Disney Channel original movie You Wish!. In 2004, Lahana starred in Power Rangers: Dino Thunder as Kira Ford, the Yellow Dino Ranger. She recorded multiple songs for the series, including "Patiently" and "Freak You Out". She later reprised this role in episodes of Power Rangers: SPD and Power Rangers: Operation Overdrive.

Lahana began her music career after joining BMI in 2005, although she later quit the industry due to sexual harassment.

Lahana appeared in the 15th episode of the fourth season of Stargate Atlantis, "Outcast", and as the waitress abducted by a serial killer on a third-season episode of Psych. Lahana appeared in the films Alien Agent (2007) and the true-crime thriller Dear Mr. Gacy (2010), in the latter of which she played the girlfriend of Jason Moss. In 2010, she played the role of Beth in the television miniseries Seven Deadly Sins.

Lahana played a recurring character on the TV series Hellcats, starring Aly Michalka and Ashley Tisdale. She appeared in the music video for Drew Seeley's single "How a Heart Breaks". In 2012, she appeared in the television movie Big Time Movie (2012). In 2013, Lahana was cast in the recurring role of Jennifer Mason on the Syfy drama series, Haven.

In 2018, Lahana was cast as a series regular in the Freeform television series Cloak & Dagger, where she played New Orleans police detective Brigid O'Reilly for two seasons from 2018 to 2019.

== Personal life ==
Lahana is Jewish and vegan.

In 2024, she gave birth to her first child. In 2026, she gave birth to her second child.

== Filmography ==
=== Film ===
Year	Title	Role	Notes	Ref.
2007	Alien Agent	Julie	Direct-to-video film	
2008	Slap Shot 3: The Junior League	Shayne Baker	Direct-to-video film	
2009	The Girlfriend Experience	Adrian		
2010	Ratko: The Dictator's Son	Sorority Girl in Sweats		
2010	Transparency	Alex		
2010	Dear Mr. Gacy	Alyssa		
2013	Afterparty	Hailey		
2021	Safer at Home	Mia	Direct-to-video film	

=== Television ===
Year	Title	Role	Notes
2000–2001	Shortland Street	Erin Kingston	
2003	You Wish!	Fiona	Television film
2004	Power Rangers Dino Thunder	Kira Ford / Yellow Dino Ranger	Main role
2005	Power Rangers S.P.D.	Kira Ford / Yellow Dino Ranger	Episodes: "Wormhole", "History"
2007	Nobody	Kara	Television film
2007	Supernatural	Jen	Episode: "Tall Tales"
2007	Kyle XY	Girl	Episode: "Does Kyle Dream of Electric Fish?"
2007	Power Rangers Operation Overdrive	Kira Ford / Yellow Dino Ranger	Episodes: "Once a Ranger: Parts 1 & 2"
2007	Whistler	Angela	Episode: "Road Trip"
2008	Stargate Atlantis	Ava Dixon	Episode: "Outcast"
2008	The L Word	Missy P	Episode: "Lesbians Gone Wild"
2009	Psych	Waitress	Episode: "An Evening with Mr. Yang"
2009	Polar Storm	Zoe	Television film
2009	The Guard	Emily Greig	Episodes: "He Is Heavy, He's My Brother", "Boom", "Full Circle"
2010	Seven Deadly Sins	Beth Manning	Television miniseries
2010–2011	Heartland	Blair	Episodes: "Homecoming", "Mood Swings"
2010–2011	Hellcats	Charlotte Monroe	Recurring role
2011	Trading Christmas	Heather Spengler	Television film
2012	Big Time Movie	Penny Lane	Television film
2012	Emily Owens, M.D.	Hannah	Episode: "Emily and... the Question of Faith"
2013	Arctic Air	Alex	Recurring role (season 2)
2013	Haven	Jennifer Mason	Recurring role (season 4)
2018	Private Eyes	Holly Brown	Episode: "The Hills Have Eyes"
2018–2019	Cloak & Dagger	Brigid O'Reilly / Mayhem	Main role
2022	My Best Friend's Wedding Planner	Mindy Carmichael	Television film
2025	The Rookie	Greta Wooston	Episode: "Mad About Murder"
