= Jason Moss =

Jason Moss may refer to:

- Jason Moss (writer) (1975–2006), American writer on serial killers
- Jason Moss (musician) (born 1969), American musician
