= Jesse Moss (actor) =

Canadian actor (born 1983)

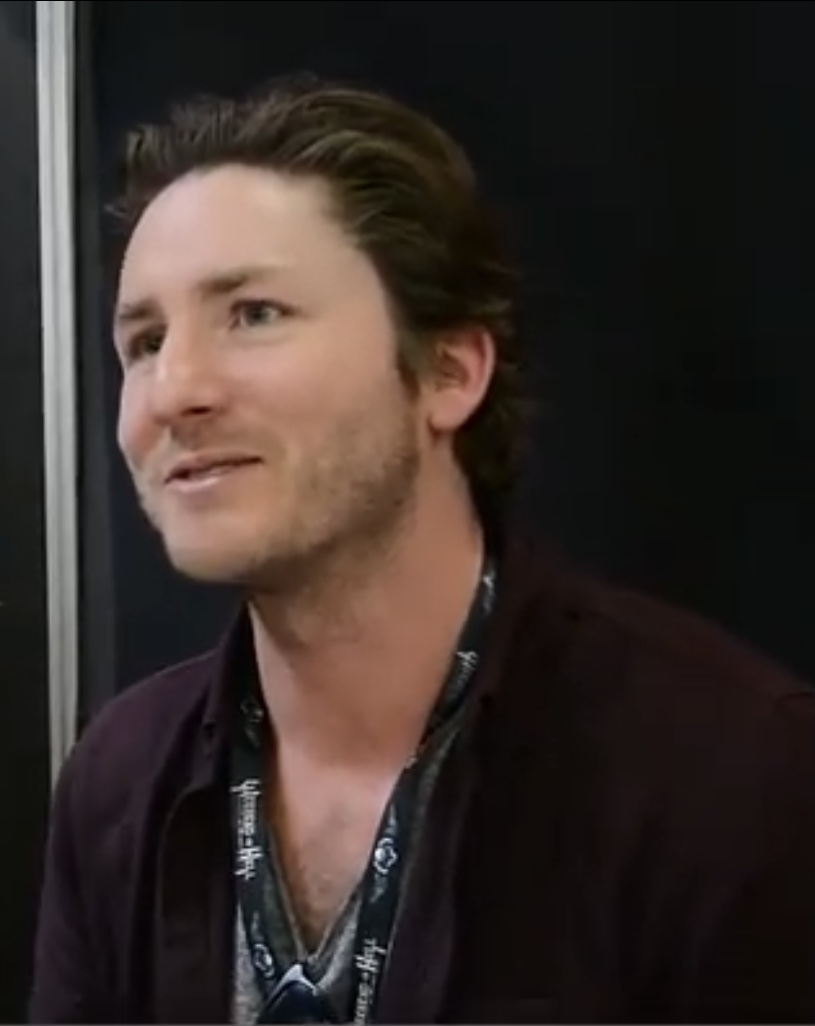
- Moss at the 2018 Weekend of Hell
- Born: May 4, 1983 (age 43); Vancouver, British Columbia, Canada
- Occupation: Actor
- Years active: 1991–present
- Relatives: Tegan Moss (sister)

Jesse Moss (born May 4, 1983) is a Canadian actor. He is perhaps best known for his roles on the teen drama series Whistler (2006–2008), as well as in the horror films Ginger Snaps (2000), Final Destination 3 (2006), The Uninvited (2009), and Tucker & Dale vs. Evil (2010). He has been nominated for six Leo Awards, winning one for Whistler in 2007.

== Life and career ==
Moss is best known for his roles of Jason Wise in Final Destination 3 and Quinn McKaye on Whistler, for which Moss won a Leo Award for Best Lead Performance by a Male in a Dramatic Series in 2007. Moss also starred in Dear Mr. Gacy, the 2010 film adaptation of The Last Victim, the memoirs of Jason Moss (no relation). The film focuses on Jason (played by Jesse Moss), a college student who corresponded with notorious serial killer John Wayne Gacy (played by William Forsythe).

He has also been involved as a voice actor in animation including Reboot, Billy the Cat, Trollz, Firehouse Tales, Captain Zed and the Zee Zone, Troll Tales, My Little Pony Tales, Pocket Dragon Adventures, Mary-Kate and Ashley in Action! and Mummies Alive!.

Moss has one brother, Rory Moss, and one sister, actress Tegan Moss.

== Filmography ==
=== Film ===
Year	Title	Role	Notes
1991	The Magic Trolls and the Troll Warriors	(voice)	Animated short
1994	Cinderella	(voice)	Video
1994	Happy, the Littlest Bunny	(voice)	Video short
1994	Leo the Lion: King of the Jungle	(voice)	Video
1994	Pocahontas	(voice)	Video
1995	Hercules	(voice)	Video
1995	Alice in Wonderland	(voice)	Video
1995	Magic Gift of the Snowman	(voice)	Video
1995	Heidi	(voice)	Video
1995	Curly: The Littlest Puppy	(voice)	Video
1995	Jungle Book	(voice)	Video
1995	Snow White	(voice)	Video
1995	Black Beauty	(voice)	Video
1995	The Nutcracker	(voice)	Video
1995	Little Red Riding Hood	(voice)	Video
1995	Sleeping Beauty	(voice)	Video
1995	Gold Diggers: The Secret of Bear Mountain	Adam	
1996	The Hunchback of Notre Dame	(voice)	Video
1997	Troll Tales	Bandit	(voice)
1998	Mummies Alive! The Legend Begins	Additional Voices	Video
1998	Nightmare in Big Sky Country	Dwain	
2000	Ginger Snaps	Jason	
2001	Speak	Older boy	Short film
2001	Prozac Nation	Sam	
2004	Have You Heard? Secret Central	Matt Mitchell	Video
2004	Love on the Side	Dwayne	
2005	Missing in America	Robert W. Gardner	
2006	Final Destination 3	Jason Wise	
2007	Partition	Andrew Stilwell	
2008	Free Style	Justin Maynard	
2009	The Uninvited	Matthew Hendricks	
2009	Wild Cherry	Brad 'Skeets' Skeetowski	
2010	Tucker & Dale vs. Evil	Chad	Nominated—Leo Award for Best Supporting Performance by a Male in a Feature Length Drama
2010	Dear Mr. Gacy	Jason Moss	
2011	The Big Year	Darren	
2013	Rocketship Misfits	Lee Brandon	Short film
2013	13 Eerie	Patrick	
2013	Vikingdom	Frey	
2014	Extraterrestrial	Seth	
2014	Ring by Spring	Lee Brandon	Austin Kirkwood
2014	WolfCop	Gang Leader	
2017	Still/Born	Jack	
2018	Daddy's Girl	Deputy Scott Walker	
2019	Colours	Mr. Lister	Short film
2019	Where Darkness Lies	Jamie	Short film
2025	The Boy Who Vanished	Michael Conner	Cast along with his sister Tegan

=== Television ===
Year	Title	Role	Notes
1991	Captain Zed and the Zee Zone	Additional Voice	TV series
1992	My Little Pony Tales	Additional Voices	TV series
1993	Relentless: Mind of a Killer	Boy Running	TV movie
1993	Double Dragon	Additional Voices	TV series
1993	Animated Classic Showcase	Misha, Jatto (voice)	12 episodes
1994	The Odyssey	The Fatman	Episode: "Who Do You Believe?"
1994	The Commish	Freddy	Episode: "Sergeant Kelly"
1994	Incident at Deception Ridge	Sam Bates	TV movie
1994	Hawkeye	Wind Shadow	Episode: "The Vision"
1994	The Legend of the Hawaiian Slammers	Ronnie (voice)	TV movie
1994	Highlander	Sean	Episode: "The Lamb"
1994–1997	ReBoot	Enzo Matrix #1 / Slimey Goober (voice)	11 episodes
1995	Are You Afraid of the Dark?	Hank Williamson; Jason	Episode: "The Tale of Train Magic"; Episode: "The Tale of C7"
1995	The Outer Limits	Jason Stewart	Episode: "Dark Matters"
1996	Prisoner of Zenda, Inc.	Schoolmate	TV movie
1996	Angel Flight Down	Travis Bagshaw	TV movie
1996	Two	Sam	Episode: "No Man's Land"
1996	Billy the Cat	Billy (voice)	26 episodes
1997	Poltergeist: The Legacy	Peter Hoth	Episode: "Mind's Eye"
1997	Mummies Alive!	Additional Voice	Episode: "Pack to the Future"
1997	Honey, I Shrunk the Kids: The TV Show	Howard	Episode: "Honey, You're Living in the Past"
1997	The Outer Limits	Sean Tenzer	Episode: "Feasibility Study"
1998	Stories from My Childhood	(voice)	Episode: "The Wild Swans"
1998	Pocket Dragon Adventures	Additional Voices	TV series
1998	Noah	Levon Waters	TV movie
1999	Stargate SG-1	Lieutenant J. Hibbard	Episode: "Rules of Engagement"
1999	Cold Squad	Malcolm Steeves	Episode: "Pretty Fly for a Dead Guy"
2000	The Magician's House II	Mark Morden	TV short
2000	Sole Survivor	Gas Attendant	TV movie
2000	Level 9	Zero	Episode: "The Programmer"
2001	So Weird	Roland Cunningham	Episode: "Babel"
2001	The Outer Limits	Jason Stewart	Episode: "Abduction"
2001	Dark Angel	Bullett / X6	Episode: "Bag 'Em"
2001	Just Deal	Kyle	Episode: "School Prayer"
2001–2002	Mary-Kate and Ashley in Action!	(voice)	4 episodes
2002	Mysterious Ways	Jimmy Miller	Episode: "Logan Miller"
2002	Due East	Michael Yaeger	TV movie
2002	Jeremiah	Neal	Episode: "The Touch"
2002	Door to Door	Watkins Stock Boy	TV movie
2002	Beyond Belief: Fact or Fiction	Gary	Episode: "The Vigil"
2002	The Twilight Zone	Logan Agar	Episode: "Evergreen"
2002	John Doe	Lewis Evans	Episode: "Low Art"
2002	The Dead Zone	Scott	Episode: "Enemy Mind"
2004	Tru Calling	Matt Baxter	Episode: "Rear Window"
2004	Zolar	Dex	TV movie
2005	Into the West	Rider #1	Episode: "Dreams and Schemes"
2005–2006	The Collector	Ty	3 episodes
2005–2006	Firehouse Tales	Red (voice)	26 episodes
2006	Alice, I Think	Aubrey	Episode: "Aubrey"
2006	The Dead Zone	Josh Blake	Episode: "Articles of Faith"
2006–2007	Whistler	Quinn McKaye	26 episodes
2007	Crossroads: A Story of Forgiveness	Derek	TV movie
2007	Tell Me No Lies	Jordan Bates	TV movie
2008	Mom, Dad and Her	Zach	TV movie
2008	The Andromeda Strain	Jeff Megan	Episode: "1.1"
2009	Spectacular!	Nils	TV movie
2010	Merlin and the Book of Beasts	Lysanor	TV movie
2010	Bond of Silence	Aaron	TV movie
2011	Iron Invader	Max	TV movie
2011	Garden of Evil	Joe	TV movie
2012	Seattle Superstorm	Hudson	TV movie
2012	Continuum	Shane Mathers	Episode: "Matter of Time"
2012	Duke	Matt	TV movie
2013	She Made Them Do It	McCorkle	TV movie
2013	Stalkers	Brian	TV movie
2013–2014	Cedar Cove	Ian Rendall	7 episodes
2014	Arctic Air	Hank	Episode: "On the Edge"
2014	Motive	Doug Butcher	Episode: "Kiss of Death"
2014	Strange Empire	Porter	Episode: "Buckskin Princess"
2015	A Gift of Miracles	Nathan	TV movie
2016	Signed, Sealed, Delivered: Lost Without You	Topper	TV movie
2017	Moonlight in Vermont	Nate	HTV Movie
2018	Morning Show Mystery: Mortal Mishaps	Phil	TV Movie
2018	Reap What You Sew: An Aurora Teagarden Mystery	Dustin Sykes	TV Movie
2018–2020	The Hollow	Skeet (voice)	Series
2019	The Wrong Man	Tim Reynolds	TV Movie
2019	A Murder in Mind	Phil	TV Movie
2019	Morning Show Mysteries: Countdown to Murder	Phil	TV Movie
2019	Death by Design	Phil	TV Movie
2019	A Blue Ridge Mountain Christmas	Austin	TV Movie
2020	Dead Over Diamonds	Daniel Drake	TV Movie
2020	Picture Perfect Mysteries: Exit, Stage Death	Daniel Drake	TV Movie
2021	Sweet Carolina	Jeff Wilder	TV Movie
2021	Morning Show Mysteries: Murder Ever After	Phil	TV Movie
2021	The Christmas Promise	Teddy	TV Movie
2021	Tribal	Allistair Drucker	6 episodes
2022	Harmony from the Heart	Max Williams	TV Movie
2023	The Cases of Mystery Lane	Kyle Henicker	TV Movie
2023–2025	Lego Dreamzzz: Trials of the Dream Chasers	Dallas	7 episodes
2024	Sight Unseen	Tristan Keyes	Episode: "Jake"
2024	An Easter Bloom	Craig	TV Movie
2024	Hudson & Rex	Trent Barnes	Episode: "Rex, Drugs & Rock 'n' Roll"
2025	Yellowjackets	Joel	2 episodes
2025	Alert: Missing Persons Unit	Spider	Episode: "Lay"
