= Svetozar Ristovski =

Macedonian film director (born 1972)

Svetozar Ristovski (born January 26, 1972) is a Macedonian film director who now resides in Canada. His first film was the 2000 short Hunter about the psychological study of a wartime sniper. He marked his English language debut with 2010's Dear Mr. Gacy, about American serial killer John Wayne Gacy. In addition to the awards he won for Mirage, he also won the Golden Lily Award at GoEast for Joy of Life in 2002.

== Filmography ==
- Lazar (2015)
- Dear Mr. Gacy (2010)
- Mirage (2004)
- Joy of Life (2001)
- Hunter (2000)
