= Meteor and the Mighty Monster Trucks =

- Also known as: Bigfoot Presents: Meteor and the Mighty Monster Trucks
- Genre: Educational; Adventure; Children's television series
- Created by: David Snyder; Bill Gross
- Developed by: David Snyder; Ken Cuperus
- Directed by: Dave Beatty (episodes 1–3); Trevor Hierons (episodes 4–26)
- Voices of: Cameron Ansell; Scott McCord; Martin Roach; Rod Wilson; Mitchell Eisner; Cliff Saunders
- Countries of origin: United States; Canada
- No. of seasons: 1
- No. of episodes: 26 (52 segments)

Production
- Executive producers: David Snyder; Bill Gross; Marjorie Kaplan; James D. Stern; Douglas E. Hansen
- Producer: Christine Klohk
- Running time: 23 minutes
- Production companies: Bigfoot, Inc. RC2 Corporation; Endgame Entertainment; Big Bang Digital Studios; Brandissimo! Inc. CCI Entertainment

Original release
- Network: Discovery Kids/TLC
- Release: September 25, 2006 – July 1, 2008

Meteor and the Mighty Monster Trucks is an animated preschool television series created by David Snyder and Bill Gross. The series aired from September 25, 2006, to July 1, 2008, on both Discovery Kids and TLC. The series is produced by Bigfoot, Inc., RC2 Corporation, Big Bang Digital Studios, Endgame Entertainment, and CCI Entertainment in association with Discovery Kids. It presented the fictional adventures of anthropomorphic monster trucks with the personalities of younger children.

In 2007, the series was nominated for an Emmy Award in the Outstanding Special Class Animated Programs category. Head writers credited on the show were Ken Cuperus, Alice Prodanou and Dave Dias. Voices were recorded in Toronto, Ontario, Canada.

== Plot ==
Episodes take place in the fictional place of Crushington Park, especially in a practice arena full of obstacles and cars to destroy. The reference to Bigfoot (the original monster truck) was mentioned later in the program. The first premiere episode "Race Relations" does not have the character LT (Bigfoot's son), but instead has a tow truck named Hook who also has a profile on the official website.

== Characters ==
=== Main ===
- Meteor T. Rover, best known as just Meteor, (voiced by Cameron Ansell), is a space expeditionary rover-modeled monster truck sporting red tires and the main protagonist of the series. He doesn't have a specific treadmark, he just has a dozen small domes on his tires.
- José (voiced by Mitchell Eisner) is a fire engine-modeled monster truck and the cousin of LT. Has pickaxe and fire helmet patterns on his tires, although they are salty despite the fact they do not go down the sides of his tires.
- Junkboy (voiced by Cliff Saunders) is a garbage truck-modeled monster truck. Has trash can patterns on his tires, they are salty as they correctly go down the sides of his tires.
- Ponytail (voiced by Tajja Isen) is a pink monster truck sporting a blonde ponytail and horseshoe patterns on her tires.
- Little Tow, also known as its abbreviation LT, (voiced by Scott McCord), is a tow truck-modeled monster truck based on the 2004-2008 Ford F-150, who is the son of Bigfoot and the cousin of José. Has tow hook patterns on his tires.
- Sarge (voiced by Dan Petronijevic) is a military Jeep-modeled monster truck. He typically refers to his friends as "soldiers", hence his military-like personality. It is unknown what his treadmarks look like.
- Sinker (voiced by Linda Ballantyne) is a bluish-green monster truck decked out in fishing gear and wears a red and yellow checkered hat. Has fish patterns on his tires.
- Amby (voiced by Laurie Elliot) is an ambulance-modeled monster truck. Has band-aid patterns on his tires.
- Big Wheelie (voiced by Martin Roach) is a school bus-modeled monster truck with flames, and the teacher/headmaster of Crushington Park School.
- Race Announcer (voiced by Brad Adamson) is an off-screen announcer who commentates the races the trucks are in.

=== Supporting ===
- Bigfoot (voiced by Rod Wilson) is the most famous monster truck. He is LT and Zooey's dad, and José's uncle. Bigfoot is always seen at the Crushington Park Speedway practicing with the other famous monster trucks. Loosely based on a lot more generic version of the ninth generation Ford F-Series with a split windshield, minus the turn signals, and named after the truck of the same name.
- Boo Boo (voiced by George Buza) is the owner of Boo Boo's Body Shop and is the only mechanic in town.
- Buck Haymaker (voiced by Keith Hampshire) is a tractor-styled monster truck. He is Pony's father and Duke's uncle.
- Cement Brent (voiced by Colin O'Meara) is a cement truck-styled monster truck. He is the father of Concrete Pete.
- Concrete Pete (voiced by Billy Rosemberg) is a young cement truck-styled monster truck. Has V-shaped patterns on his tires.
- Cosmo Starfinder (voiced by Len Carlson) is a famous monster truck who is one of Meteor's heroes.
- Crushmeister (voiced by Cathal J. Dodd) is a famous red and yellow monster truck. He is friends with Big Wheelie and has Lightyear tires.
- Duke (voiced by Lyon Smith) is Pony's cousin. Has cow horn patterns on his tires.
- Dynamic Dan (voiced by Brian Froud) is the host of the TV show "Monster Trucking Today." Has film patterns on his tires.
- Forby Forklift is a forklift-styled monster truck with golden-brown tires.
- Grandpa Rover (voiced by Bill Lynn) is Meteor's grandfather.
- Hook (voiced by Jo Vannicola) is an orange monster truck who has broken lightbulb and cross-bone patterns on his tires. He was only seen in the first episode and was replaced by Little Tow
- King Crush is an oversized steamroller-like monster truck from the horror movies.
- Mrs. Halftrack (voiced by Valerie Boyle) is a monster truck that once served in the military. She served as substitute teacher while Big Wheelie was competing in a mountain monster truck race in "Where's Wheelie".
- Mrs. Rover (voiced by Julie Lemieux) is Meteor's mom who is currently on a space mission.
- Senora Rosa (voiced by Rosa Labordé) is LT and Zooey's mom is a rollback-modeled monster truck. Has rose patterns on her tires.
- Sue the Rooter (voiced by Stacey DePass) is a sewage truck-styled monster truck. Has plunger patterns on her tires.
- Zooey (voiced by Isabel de Carteret) is LT's younger sister. She has two pigtails, and knows everything about animals. Has paw-print patterns on her tires.
- Girl Truck (voiced by Alessandra Cannito in "King Krush" and Tajja Isen in "Special Delivery") is a yellow truck resembling Amby.
- Boy Truck (voiced by Timothy Lai in "King Krush" and Cole Caplan in "Special Delivery") is a blue truck resembling Ponytail.

== Episodes ==
No.	Title	Original release date
1	"Race Relations / Monster Trucking Today"	September 25, 2006
Meteor is new to Crushing Park School and is nervous about being in his new school. When Dynamite Dan the TV Van arrives to do a news story on up and coming young trucks, the boys' efforts to showcase their abilities leads to mayhem - leaving a calm and collected Pony as Dan's pick for the story.
2	"Here Comes the Crushmeister / Overheated"	September 26, 2006
Meteor volunteers to pick up the tickets for everyone to see the Crushmeister, one of the most famous monster trucks in Crushington Park. Thinking that Big Wheelie's time-trial race is way too hard for a him, Amby fakes sick by overheating his engine.
3	"Hangtime / Try, Try Again"	September 27, 2006
The trucks learn a lesson about safety when they enter a restricted area of the junkyard and Meteor is accidentally suspended over the car lot by a magnet. Meteor realizes that if he doesn't get something right the first time, practice makes perfect.
4	"Grandpa Was a Moonrover / The Backwards Race"	September 28, 2006
Meteor is looking forward to a visit from his hero his Grandpa, the original moon rover. Meteor learns how important it is to learn the basics instead of relying on technology.
5	"Top Secret / A Maze-ing Race"	September 29, 2006
Meteor becomes upset when his friends sneak around on him during a game of hide and seek. Big Wheelie gives the trucks a lesson in following instructions when he sets up a race in a maze with distractions at every turn.
6	"Mending Fences / On Shaky Ground"	October 2, 2006
After trying to impress the trucks with bragging and stories, a young cement mixer, Concrete Pete, ends up winning them over with honesty. Pony's cousin Duke, a slightly older rodeo truck, shows up at Crushington Park School for a visit.
7	"Meteor's Nightmare / Missing Mom"	October 3, 2006
Meteor can't forget a nightmare about Little Tow pushing him into a ditch on the side of the road so he avoids him, for fear that his bad dream may come true. Meteor finds the courage to admit he misses his Mom when she leaves for Mars.
8	"King Krush / Meteor in Charge"	October 4, 2006
The trucks scare themselves into believing that the movie monster, King Krush is real, and is waiting for them at the school. Meteor must learn not to be a bossy leader when he's chosen by Big Wheelie to lead his friends in creating a new race track.
9	"Tag Along / The Truck Who Cried Tow"	October 5, 2006
Frustrated by how Zooey always copies him, Little Tow discovers it's because she idolizes him the same way he idolizes his Dad, Bigfoot. Little Tow gets his friends stuck in the mud during a game of 'follow the leader' so he can tow them out.
10	"The Big Sleepover / Sue the Rooter Truck"	October 30, 2006
Little Tow invites the kids over for a sleepover party the night before a big race. A stinky, bossy Rooter Truck named Sue rubs the trucks the wrong way until Pony befriends her and everyone learns the value of reaching out to someone who is different.
11	"Teamwork / Space Rangers"	October 31, 2006
Too caught up in his own skills as a racer, Jose fails to listen to his partner Pony, and as a result ends up belly up instead of at the finish line. Meteor learns that he's got what it takes to be a great space rover, despite not winning all the races. Note: This episode was dedicated to Len Carlson, who died of a heart attack on January 26, 2006 at the age of 68.
12	"The Pennant Race / Where's Wheelie?"	November 1, 2006
Meteor accuses his friends of stealing the prized racing pennant only to learn that he dropped the pennant during an earlier race. When Big Wheelie leaves his class in the hands of a substitute teacher, the trucks must learn to deal with change.
13	"Snag the Flag / The Big Timeout"	November 2, 2006
When a shy young forklift joins the trucks in an exciting game of Capture the Flag, Meteor manages to show him all the amazing skills he never knew he had. Meteor and Jose receive a 'time out' for crashing into a very special starting light.
14	"Bathtime for Junkboy / Sinker's Lucky Pump"	November 3, 2006
Meteor manages to help Junkboy get over his fear of water by taking the filthy little garbage truck for a fun-filled trip to Gunkbusters. Sinker wins a race against his speedier friends, and begins to believe it's because he used a specific pump.
15	"Fast Friends / A Monster Truck Tale"	April 16, 2007
Meteor learns his new friend, Little Tow, is the son of his all-time favorite pro monster truck, Bigfoot. Meteor's Grandpa tells the trucks a bedtime story about a monster of a monster truck.
16	"Stomp, Honk, Rock & Roll / Truck Trouble"	April 17, 2007
Little Tow manages to overcome stage fright during a school performance with a helping 'honk' from his little sister, Zooey. When Amby accidentally knocks over Bigfoot's obstacle course, he's afraid to tell the truth.
17	"Cheering Section / Your Name is Mud"	April 18, 2007
When Junkboy cheers for Crushmeister instead Bigfoot at the Champion Monster Truck Crush-Off, LT learns that good sportsmanship means being supportive of all competitors. Meteor gets stuck in an extra-deep mud puddle and Junkboy thinks it's his fault.
18	"Fender Bender / Road Map"	April 19, 2007
Little Tow is afraid to admit the truth after breaking one of Boo Boo’s billboards, when his cousin Jose, thinking he’s responsible for the damage, takes the blame. Meteor’s Grandpa shows Meteor, Junkboy, and Little Tow how fun puzzles can be when he sends them on a scavenger hunt consisting of riddles, with a surprise trip to Gunkbusters as their reward.
19	"Moving Truck / Charity Drive"	September 10, 2007
A misunderstanding leads Little Tow to believe his family is moving again. Charity goes out the window when Jose and Little Tow get over-competitive while collecting hubcaps for a Crushington Park charity drive fundraiser.
20	"Eyes on the Prize / Pushing the Limits"	September 11, 2007
When Little Tow asks to watch over Bigfoot's trophy, he learns the importance of responsibility when the trophy goes missing. While on a trip to the Crushington Crashers Speedway with Grandpa, Meteor meets Bigfoot, his all time favorite pro monster truck.
21	"Winner's Circle / April Fool's Day"	September 12, 2007
Jose thinks he wins every race, but the rest of the little monster trucks remember differently. It's April Fuel's Day and Little Tow is pulling all sorts of pranks on the other trucks - especially on a frustrated Meteor.
22	"Trucktacular Truckathalon / Boomers"	September 13, 2007
When the biggest race of the year rolls around, LT is disappointed to be paired with his Mom instead of with Bigfoot. Meteor, Junkboy and Pony must prove to the rest of the trucks that the tire blow-outs they've experienced isn't contagious.
23	"Monster Truck Club / Rebel Rover"	September 14, 2007
The trucks realize they don't need a clubhouse to be a great club. When Big Wheelie picks Meteor repeatedly to go first in all his class turning drills, Meteor chafes at being called a 'Teacher's Pet' .
24	"Fright Busters / A Big Hook for Little Tow"	October 29, 2007
Bigfoot takes his family on a "Fright Busters" tour around Crushington Park. Little Tow becomes utterly enamored by an old hook of Bigfoot's that he's found in his backyard.
25	"Monster Crush / Special Delivery"	May 9, 2008
Little Tow and his friends are annoyed when Zooey keeps stopping to help trucks in need on their way to a big crush-off. Meteor receives a package from his Mom, who's away on a Mars mission.
26	"Like Father, Like Son / Twin Engines"	July 1, 2008
Little Tow and Bigfoot enjoy some father-son bonding time while getting a task done for Senora Rosa. Meteor and Little Tow are taken on the rides of their lives while keeping an eye on two very high-octane twin ATV toddlers for a friend of Senora Rosa's.

== Broadcast ==
The series made its world premiere in the United Kingdom on Cartoon Network Too on September 4, 2006, as a launch program for their Cartoonito block. In the U.S., the show aired on Discovery Kids (now Discovery Family) from September 25, 2006 to October 9, 2010, and TLC from October 2, 2006 to September 26, 2008. Reruns of the show later aired on Qubo from March 30, 2015 to December 31, 2017.

In Canada, the show aired on the Canadian version of Discovery Kids.

Internationally, the show aired on Boomerang's Tiny TV block in Australia, Nickelodeon in India, Kids Central in Singapore, RTB2 in Brunei, VTM Kids in Belgium, Pop in Slovenia, and TVB Pearl in China.

=== Christian version ===
Rising Star Studios produced a Christian version of the series, titled Monster Truck Adventures, was produced and aired on The Church Channel, TBN, and Smile from October 2, 2012 to 2020. In this version, a different race announcer would expound more upon each episode by reviewing its events and linking it to a Bible verse.

It was also broadcast on the Australian Christian Channel in Australia.
