= List of The Adventures of Bottle Top Bill and His Best Friend Corky episodes =

The Adventures of Bottle Top Bill and His Best Friend Corky is an Australian animated children's television series that first aired on ABC Kids on 8 August 2005 to 20 April 2009. In total, 104 episodes aired across four series.

== Series overview ==
Series	Episodes	Originally released	
Series	Episodes	First released	Last released
1	26	8 August 2005	TBA
2	26	TBA	TBA
3	26	TBA	TBA
4	26	TBA	20 April 2009

== Season 1 (2005–06) ==
No. overall	No. in season	Title	Directed by	Written by	Original release date
1	1	"The Junkosaur"	Cameron Chittock	Kevin Nemeth	8 August 2005
Just what is a Junkosaur? Think of a dinosaur then think of a pile of junk. Put them together and what have you got? A Junkosaur!
2	2	"A Day at the Sea"	Cameron Chittock	Kevin Nemeth	TBA
Bill and Corky come across a strange old map in the attic of their home. Could it be a treasure map? Bill thinks there's only one way to find out. He and Corky set out to find a treasure.
3	3	"Moon Mayhem"	Cameron Chittock	Kevin Nemeth	TBA
Did Bill and Corky really see that? They were watching the moon through a telescope when they thought they saw something take a bite out of the moon. Could something be eating the moon?
4	4	"The Great Wild Woolly"	Cameron Chittock	Kevin Nemeth	TBA
Bill and Corky settle down for an easy and restful day looking after Mrs. Whistlehead's sheep. It's not easy or restful for long, not with the Great Wild Woolly about.
5	5	"The Fairy with No Wings"	Cameron Chittock	Kevin Nemeth	TBA
Fairies are supposed to have wings, right? That's what Bill and Corky have always thought. That's why they mistook Dandy the fairy for a strange bee when they first spotted him in their garden.
6	6	"Cow of a Time"	Cameron Chittock	Kevin Nemeth	TBA
Ah, Maisy, what is Bill and Corky to do with you? Maisy is Mrs. Whistlehead's prize cow and she's got her hungry eyes on Mrs. Whistlehead's tasty vegetable patch. It's Bill and Corky's job to keep her out.
7	7	"Ram Racer"	Cameron Chittock	Kevin Nemeth	TBA
Mrs. Whistlehead has a new car and Bill and Corky are hopping in excitement. The Great Wild Woolly spoils their fun and uses the car to take off with her sheep. Can Bill and Corky get the car and the sheep back?
8	8	"Benny Beetle"	Cameron Chittock	Kevin Nemeth	TBA
You beauty! Bill and Corky are all set to have a glass of milk and a chocolate biscuit. That's when they find only small biscuit left. Now here's a problem. There are two of them and only one biscuit. What are they to do?
9	9	"Mighty Melon"	Cameron Chittock	Kevin Nemeth	TBA
Never? That's right, never. Bill and Corky have never been to the snow. Bill thinks it's time do something about that.
10	10	"Bill Goes Shopping"	Cameron Chittock	Kevin Nemeth	TBA
Bill has a hole in his hat and he and Corky are off to the shopping centre to get a new one.
11	11	"The Eerie Eater"	Cameron Chittock	Kevin Nemeth	TBA
Catch that cat! Bill and Corky were just about sit down for a picnic lunch when a naughty pussycat takes their basket full of food.
12	12	"Naughty Ned"	Cameron Chittock	Kevin Nemeth	TBA
It's about time. That old shed in Bill and Corky's backyard has needed painting for quite a while. Bill and Corky gather up the paint and brushes and get cracking.
13	13	"A Good Hair Day"	Cameron Chittock	Rosemary Barratt	TBA
He's doing it again! The Great Wild Woolly is trying to lead all of Mrs. Whistlehead's sheep away. Bill and Corky quickly put a stop to his plan, but not before all the sheep get muddy and dirty.
14	14	"Trouble in Fairlyand"	Cameron Chittock	Kevin Nemeth	TBA
Bill and Corky are visiting their favourite place – Fairyland. Yet something very odd is happening. Everything and everyone is being jumbled up.
15	15	"The Snow Monster"	Cameron Chittock	Rosemary Barratt	TBA
Never? That's right, never. Bill and Corky have never been to the snow. Bill thinks it's time do something about that.
16	16	"Anyone for Tennis"	Cameron Chittock	Arrabella Warner	TBA
Bill and Corky love to play tennis, except for one thing. They don't love trying to find the ball if they ever hit it over the fence. They think they must be an easy way to retrieve their ball but what is it?
17	17	"A Good Deed Day"	Cameron Chittock	David Witt	TBA
It's Good Deed Day and Bill and Corky are on the lookout for a good deed to do. They soon find one. The town is full of rubbish and Bill and Corky are ready to clean it up. Now that's a good deed indeed!
18	18	"Wild Woolly Jumper"	Cameron Chittock	Sadie Wilson	TBA
It's a scorcher! Bill and Corky can't remember a day as hot as this one. Yet if they're having a hard time coping with the heat, Mrs. Whistlehead's sheep are having an even harder time. You would too if you had all that hot wool on you.
19	19	"Walking the Dog"	Cameron Chittock	Arrabella Warner	TBA
Mrs. Whistlehead asks Bill and Corky to give Timmy his walk. However, chaos ensues when a robot goes haywire and Timmy heads into town and ruins a cat show which is being managed by Mrs. Whistlehead.
20	20	"A Windy Day"	Cameron Chittock	Arrabella Warner	TBA
Bill & Corky get cracking on their clothes washing. It's a windy day and that will dry the clothes very nicely. Maybe it's too windy. Bill & Corky's clothes soon fly off all over town.
21	21	"The Big Drip"	Cameron Chittock	Arrabella Warner	TBA
Bill and Corky argue about who will have the first bath, the first bowl of cereal and who will go up a ladder first. Soon, water rises around their house and Peter the Plumber comes to their rescue.
22	22	"That's Magic"	Cameron Chittock	Sally Marchant	TBA
Bill and Corky have got the bug. What bug? The magic bug! After watching a magician perform, Bill and Corky want to try magic for themselves. They know a person who can help. A person? Make that a fairy, Dandy the fairy.
23	23	"The Big Fish"	Cameron Chittock	Nick Wilson	TBA
The Whopper is a legend of a big fish and whoever can catch the Whopper will become a legend too. Bill plans to be that legend.
24	24	"Ramshackle House Ride"	Cameron Chittock	Rosemary Barrett	TBA
Neighbour Ned is doing a lot of showing off. Bill and Corky don't like it at all. They go with Ned to the local fun fair to try and teach him a lesson about showing off.
25	25	"The Big Swim"	Cameron Chittock	Arrabella Warner	TBA
Paint me pink! Is Molly what Bill and Corky think she is? She is who they think she is. Molly is a mermaid!
26	26	"Rumble's Grumbles"	Cameron Chittock	Rosemary Barrett	TBA
What's worse than a dragon with a cold? Not much! Rumble the dragon has a bad cold. Bill and Corky quickly come to Rumble's aid. Here's a problem. Just where do you find dragon medicine?

== Season 2 (2006–07) ==
No. overall	No. in season	Title	Directed by	Written by	Original release date
27	1	"The Tall Story"	Cameron Chittock	Kevin Nemeth	TBA
Bill and Corky run into a bit of trouble helping Cedric the scientist deliver a giraffe to his new home.
28	2	"The Baby Birds"	Cameron Chittock	Kevin Nemeth	TBA
Bill and Corky try to help Sandy remove a bird's nest from his head while the Great Wild Woolly schemes to steal their strawberries.
29	3	"The Fairyland Flower"	Cameron Chittock	Kevin Nemeth	TBA
When Corky decides to take a flower from Fairyland home to her garden, mayhem ensues.
30	4	"Robot Surprise"	Cameron Chittock	Kevin Nemeth	TBA
Cedric gives Bill and Corky a surprise present that malfunctions in culinary calamity.
31	5	"The Jittery Genie"	Cameron Chittock	Kevin Nemeth	TBA
When Mrs. Whistlehead asks Bill and Corky to clean up her shed, they don't expect to find a nervous Genie.
32	6	"The Lost Ball"	Cameron Chittock	Kevin Nemeth	TBA
Bill and Corky go to visit Junkosaur Island and they find themselves in scary Woppalick territory.
33	7	"The Snow Puppy"	Cameron Chittock	Kevin Nemeth	TBA
Bill and Corky take their friend Ned to see the snow where they meet Frosty, the frisky snow puppy.
34	8	"The Sheep Who Cried Wolf"	Cameron Chittock	Kevin Nemeth	TBA
That Great Wild Woolly is up to his old tricks again, and Bill, Corky and Sandy struggle to keep Mrs. Whistlehead's sheep safe from him.
35	9	"Backwards"	Cameron Chittock	Kevin Nemeth	TBA
Dandy the fairy pays a distressed visit to Bill and Corky, flying and speaking backwards.
36	10	"The Missing Sheep"	Cameron Chittock	Kevin Nemeth	TBA
Bill and Corky have a mystery to solve when they find someone has stolen Maisy the Cow and all the sheep from Mrs. Whistlehead's farm.
37	11	"The New Scarecrow"	Cameron Chittock	Kevin Nemeth	TBA
Sandy thinks he isn't a very good scarecrow, and decides to run away from Mrs. Whistlehead's farm.
38	12	"Old Lightning"	Cameron Chittock	Kevin Nemeth	TBA
When Mr. Puffer announces the old steam train is going to be used as scrap metal, Bill and Corky decide to restore Old Lightning to its former glory.
39	13	"Dandy's Birthday"	Cameron Chittock	Kevin Nemeth	TBA
Bill and Corky are excited about Dandy's birthday party, but "Dandy" seems unusually grumpy.
40	14	"Home, Sweet Home"	Cameron Chittock	Sally Marchant	TBA
When Mrs. Whistlehead decides to sell her farm, Bill and Corky help her look for a new place to live.
41	15	"T.V. Trouble"	Cameron Chittock	John Barratt	TBA
Mrs. Whistlehead invites Bill and Corky in to watch TV, but a faulty aerial puts a spanner in the works.
42	16	"A Sticky Problem"	Cameron Chittock	Arrabella Warner	TBA
Timmy's broken the front door and Bill and Corky try to fix it.
43	17	"The Naughty Dog"	Cameron Chittock	Sadie Wilson	TBA
Timmy chases a rabbit into Fairyland and gets downsized.
44	18	"Our Day Off"	Cameron Chittock	Rosemary Barratt	TBA
Bill and Corky realise that a day off can sometimes be exhausting!
45	19	"Milking the Cow"	Cameron Chittock	Arabella Warner	TBA
Will milking Maisy for Mrs. Whistlehead be as easy as pie for Bill and Corky?
46	20	"The Big Dig"	Cameron Chittock	John Barratt	TBA
Bill and Corky dig a new duck pond for Mrs. Whistlehead.
47	21	"Monkey Business"	Cameron Chittock	Sally Marchant	TBA
"Bill, Corky and Tricky the troll venture far, far away to the Jingle Jangle Jungle in search of some Boo-Boo Bananas (which are blue and turquoise bananas)".
48	22	"The Egg"	Cameron Chittock	Arabella Warner	TBA
Bill and Corky find a mystery egg when they visit the beach.
49	23	"Tricky's Holiday"	Cameron Chittock	Sally Marchant	TBA
Tricky the troll decides to take a holiday at Bill and Corky's place.
50	24	"Honey Sandwiches"	Cameron Chittock	Arabella Warner	TBA
Bill and Corky pay a visit to Farmer Sam to get some honey for breakfast.
51	25	"A Day of Surprises"	Cameron Chittock	John Barratt	TBA
Bill and Corky are in for a few surprises when they clean out Mrs. Whistlehead's cottage.
52	26	"No Kidding"	Cameron Chittock	Sadie Wilson	TBA
Farmer Sam asks Bill and Corky to look after his two kids for the afternoon.

== Season 3 (2007–08) ==
No. overall	No. in season	Title	Directed by	Written by	Original release date
53	1	"The Whale Song"	Craig Handley	Kevin Nemeth	TBA
Bill and Corky are watching the whales migrate past their favourite beach. When Ned drops his music player in the water the noise sends the whales in all directions.
54	2	"The Tooth Fairy"	Craig Handley	Kevin Nemeth	TBA
Have you ever met a dragon with a toothache? Bill and Corky do when the find Rumble the dragon has a sore tooth.
55	3	"Bills Galore"	Craig Handley	Kevin Nemeth	TBA
Dandy the fairy has warned Bill so many times – don't play around with fairy dust.
56	4	"The Faraway Friend"	Craig Handley	Kevin Nemeth	TBA
A spaceship crash-lands near Bill and Corky's home. Could it be their space friend Tamo? It isn't Tamo, but a little girl who looks like Tamo. Bill and Corky invite her to stay with them while they help repair her spaceship.
57	5	"A Dirty Day"	Craig Handley	Kevin Nemeth	TBA
Bill and Corky are putting up a new fence. They find that digging holes for the posts is a mucky job.
58	6	"Freda the Flying Folly"	Craig Handley	Kevin Nemeth	TBA
The Flying Follys are coming! Bill and Corky are very excited. The Flying Follys are the greatest acrobatic family in the world and they can't wait to see them. Even the Great Wild Woolly wants to see them.
59	7	"The Runaway Voices"	Craig Handley	Kevin Nemeth	TBA
Every time Bill and Corky visit Fairyland they learn something new. This time they discover that Tricky is the worst singer in Fairyland.
60	8	"The Snow Leopard"	Craig Handley	Kevin Nemeth	TBA
Bill and Corky are on a mission. They want to take some wildlife photos.
61	9	"The Dancing Stone"	Craig Handley	Kevin Nemeth	TBA
Sandy the scarecrow invites Bill and Corky to the annual Scarecrow get-together. It's always a great party with much dancing.
62	10	"A Helping Hand"	Craig Handley	Kevin Nemeth	TBA
Mrs. Whistlehead has a cold and needs to spend a day in bed. Bill and Corky offer to help her out while she rests.
63	11	"The Cloud Catcher"	Craig Handley	Kevin Nemeth	TBA
It hasn't rained for weeks and no rain looks like coming soon. Bill and Corky seek the help of Cedric the scientist. They're in luck as he has a new invention – the Cloud Catcher.
64	12	"The Volcano"	Craig Handley	Kevin Nemeth	TBA
JoJo the Junkosaur and his family are in terrible danger! A volcano on Junkosaur Island is about to explode! Bill and Corky have to help everyone get off the island, including the Woppalicks.
65	13	"All Mixed Up"	Craig Handley	Kevin Nemeth	TBA
Ned has been helping everyone lately, which is very good of him. What's not so good is that Ned has got a lot of things mixed up.
66	14	"A Bicycle Adventure"	Craig Handley	Helena Smee	TBA
Bill and Corky are off on a long bike ride. It promises to be a great adventure!
67	15	"A Sheep in Wolf's Clothing"	Craig Handley	John Barratt	TBA
Mrs. Whistlehead's sheep have gone missing again. Bill and Corky naturally think it's the work of the Great Wild Woolly. They soon realise that it's not him, but something much more troubling – a wolf!
68	16	"The Mummy"	Craig Handley	Arabella Warner	TBA
Bill, Corky and Dandy the fairy are on a trip to the museum. Terrific! It's even more terrific when Tricky the troll joins them. But when an Egyptian mummy fascinates Tricky, it's not so terrific.
69	17	"A Fish Out of Water"	Craig Handley	Arabella Warner	TBA
Bill and Corky are going water skiing. But to water ski you need water, and the there's none in the lake. Where did it all go?
70	18	"Search for a Star"	Craig Handley	Helena Smee	TBA
There's a talent show on and all of Bill and Corky's friends are going to perform in it. Bill and Corky would also like to be in the show – but what will they do?
71	19	"A Full House"	Craig Handley	Arabella Warner	TBA
What a storm! Bill and Corky haven't seen rain like it since...er...well, never!
72	20	"Strawberry Surprise"	Craig Handley	John Barratt	TBA
Mrs. Whistlehead plans to make a Strawberry Surprise for her annual garden party. Bill and Corky would love to know what the Strawberry Surprise is but first they have to pick the strawberries.
73	21	"The Air Show"	Craig Handley	John Barratt	TBA
An air show? With all sorts of aeroplanes and flying machines on display, it looks like being the best air show of all time! What fun! Bill and Corky just have to go and see it.
74	22	"The Runaway Chair"	Craig Handley	Arabella Warner	TBA
Bill and Corky receive a new invention from Cedric, the Runaround Chair. Bill and Corky need to put it together, but with no instructions and a not-very-helpful Ned jumping in, the Runaround Chair soon turns into the Runaway Chair!
75	23	"A Beach Picnic"	Craig Handley	Helena Smee	TBA
Bill and Corky are having a beach picnic and everyone is invited! The trouble is that in order to have a beach picnic, you have to get everyone to the beach.
76	24	"Mrs. Whistlehead's Surprise"	Craig Handley	Helena Smee	TBA
Bill and Corky plan to give a surprise present to Mrs. Whistlehead. She needs a new lamp to knit by and that's what they want to give her.
77	25	"Sheep in Fairyland"	Craig Handley	Arabella Warner	TBA
Tricky the Troll leads Mrs. Whistlehead's sheep into Fairyland. Once there, the sheep start eating everything they see.
78	26	"Looking After Jojo"	Craig Handley	Arabella Warner	TBA
Bill and Corky head for Junkosaur Island to baby-sit JoJo the Junkosaur. But when they chase a toy aeroplane into the jungle, the three of them become hopelessly lost.

== Season 4 (2008–09) ==
No. overall	No. in season	Title	Directed by	Written by	Original release date
79	1	"A Sheep in Space"	Craig Handley	Kevin Nemeth	TBA
There's trouble on Tamo's planet. Everyone is getting bad colds and Bill and Corky have to get some medicine to them. But the Great Wild Woolly takes off in Cedric's new rocket ship that contains all the medicine!
80	2	"The Monster Mystery"	Craig Handley	Kevin Nemeth	TBA
On a trip to the seaside, Bill and Corky discover a boat that takes people to see a sea monster. Joining other tourists, they take a tour and do indeed see a sea monster! But what was it?
81	3	"A Lambful of Trouble"	Craig Handley	Kevin Nemeth	TBA
How can one cute little lamb cause Bill and Corky so much trouble? The lamb loves to climb things, and Bill and Corky have to keep getting her down from trees and roofs.
82	4	"Chocolate Pudding"	Craig Handley	Kevin Nemeth	TBA
Tricky the troll thinks food would be much better if it all tasted like his favourite chocolate pudding – especially those boring old vegetables.
83	5	"Monkey Mischief"	Craig Handley	Kevin Nemeth	TBA
Rocky the monkey is sick and needs some special bananas to perk him up. Bill and Corky promise to get them – even if they have to go all the way to the Jingle Jangle Jungle. As it turns out, they do!
84	6	"The Disappearing Hat"	Craig Handley	Kevin Nemeth	TBA
Bill's hat is missing. He doesn't feel right without his hat and must find it. As Bill and Corky search for the hat, they find other things have gone missing.
85	7	"Keep the Sheep"	Craig Handley	Kevin Nemeth	TBA
Bill and Corky think Mrs. Whistlehead wants to get rid of her sheep. They'll miss the sheep terribly, but they've promised to help sell them. Then, the Great White Woolly steps in and makes trouble.
86	8	"Our New House"	Craig Handley	Kevin Nemeth	TBA
Cedric the scientist has installed his latest invention in Bill and Corky's home. It's a computer that controls the house. It can cook, clean, and even play games.
87	9	"The Wild Wooly Friend"	Craig Handley	Kevin Nemeth	TBA
Paint me pink! Bill and Corky can't believe it but the Great Wild Woolly has become nice and polite and not at all like his usual, mischievous self.
88	10	"The Scary Troll"	Craig Handley	Kevin Nemeth	TBA
Tricky the troll is very sad. Trolls are supposed to be scary but he's not. He isn't a real troll if he isn't scary.
89	11	"The Secret Box"	Craig Handley	Kevin Nemeth	TBA
Corky goes to town and brings back a box. She tells Bill that there's nothing in it but she won't show him the insides. Bill's very confused. If there's nothing in it, why is it such a big secret?
90	12	"The Shrinking Dragon"	Craig Handley	Kevin Nemeth	TBA
A jewel from Rumble's dragon treasure is missing. Bill and Corky think that Rumble has so much treasure that he won't miss it. But Rumble does miss it – for if a dragon loses any treasure, he begins to shrink.
91	13	"Bill's Birthday"	Craig Handley	Kevin Nemeth	TBA
It's Bill's birthday and Bill has many great things planned for the day. He claims that this is going to be his best birthday ever, but he is less than thrilled when his friends mention that they cannot do anything with him during the day.
92	14	"Rocks in Space"	Craig Handley	John Barratt	TBA
Bottle Top Bill and Corky, his horse are made from everyday bits and pieces. In fact, their whole world is made from junk. They travel throughout the world and meet new characters and situations in their magical adventures.
93	15	"The Giant Wave"	Craig Handley	Nick Wilson	TBA
Bottle Top Bill and Corky, his horse are made from everyday bits and pieces. In fact, their whole world is made from junk. They travel throughout the world and meet new characters and situations in their magical adventures.
94	16	"The Fairy Crown"	Craig Handley	Arabella Warner	TBA
Bottle Top Bill and Corky, his horse are made from everyday bits and pieces. In fact, their whole world is made from junk. They travel throughout the world and meet new characters and situations in their magical adventures.
95	17	"Sheep Trouble"	Craig Handley	John Barratt	TBA
Bottle Top Bill and Corky, his horse are made from everyday bits and pieces. In fact, their whole world is made from junk. They travel throughout the world and meet new characters and situations in their magical adventures.
96	18	"Catch That Go-Cart"	Craig Handley	Hannah Williams	TBA
Bottle Top Bill and Corky, his horse are made from everyday bits and pieces. In fact, their whole world is made from junk. They travel throughout the world and meet new characters and situations in their magical adventures.
97	19	"A Muddy Adventure"	Craig Handley	Helena Smee	TBA
After Bill and Corky dig a hole for a new pond for Mrs. Whistlehead, they discover a pile of mud. They hope that some new birds will decide to visit Mrs. Whistlehead's garden because of the newly-dug pond.
98	20	"A Load of Junk"	Craig Handley	Helena Smee	TBA
Bottle Top Bill and Corky, his horse are made from everyday bits and pieces. In fact, their whole world is made from junk. They travel throughout the world and meet new characters and situations in their magical adventures.
99	21	"Ship Mates"	Craig Handley	Rosemary Barratt	TBA
A storm causes havoc. Not only does it make a mess of the beach, it also sends Captain Hornswoggle's ship onto some rocks and disorientates a whale! With the help of a parrot, Bill and Corky set out to rescue the stranded seaman and the marooned marine mammal.
100	22	"The Great Sheep Run"	Craig Handley	Nick Wilson	TBA
On a hot sunny day, Bill and Corky volunteer to take Mrs. Whistlehead's sheep to the Snowy Mountain where Sid the Shearer can do what he does best. However, the Great Wild Woolly has other ideas and is intent on taking the sheep elsewhere.
101	23	"Sea Food Surprise"	Craig Handley	John Barratt	TBA
Bottle Top Bill and Corky, his horse are made from everyday bits and pieces. In fact, their whole world is made from junk. They travel throughout the world and meet new characters and situations in their magical adventures.
102	24	"The Flyaway Sheep"	Craig Handley	Rosemary Barratt	6 April 2009
Bottle Top Bill and Corky, his horse are made from everyday bits and pieces. In fact, their whole world is made from junk. They travel throughout the world and meet new characters and situations in their magical adventures.
103	25	"On Your Bike"	Allan Wadsworth	Allan Plenderith/Lucinda Whiteley	19 April 2009
Bill and Corky want to give Sandy the Scarecrow a present to cheer him up. They decide on a special bike so that he can move around – but is this what Sandy wants?
104	26	"Loot in the Loft"	Craig Handley	John Barratt	20 April 2009
Mrs. Whistlehead asks Bill and Corky to help tidy her loft and they put all the junk they find out on the lawn. Soon, the junk, which includes Mrs. Whistlehead's favourite vase, goes missing so Bill and Corky try to work out what happened.

== See also ==
- Quotations related to The Adventures of Bottle Top Bill and His Best Friend Corky at Wikiquote
