= Jo Vannicola =

Canadian actor (born 1968)

- Born: Joanne Vannicola; 1968 (age 57–58); Montreal, Quebec, Canada
- Occupation: Actor
- Years active: 1976–present
- Website: joannevannicola.com

Jo Vannicola (born 1968), formerly known as Joanne Vannicola, is a Canadian actor. They are most noted for their roles as Dr. Naadiah in Being Erica, Dr. Mia Stone in PSI Factor, Jerri in Love and Human Remains, Sam in Stonewall, Renee in Slasher: Guilty Party, Amber Ciotti in Slasher: Solstice and Slasher: Flesh and Blood, as well as voice roles in Crash Canyon and My Dad the Rock Star.

== Early life ==
Vannicola was born in Montreal, Quebec, the youngest of four children to Helen Vannicola (née Trudel). They were raised in an abusive household where their mother sexually abused them and their father physically assaulted them with their mother contributing to the violence by lying about it.

Out of pressure, Vannicola left home when they were 14. They moved to Toronto, Ontario, to attend the Toronto School for the Performing Arts.

== Career ==
Vannicola began their career at the age of 8 when they appeared on the Canadian version of Sesame Street. They had their first prominent role in the teen drama series 9B, for which they received a Gemini Award nomination for Best Actress in a Continuing Dramatic Role in 1989. In 1991, they won an Emmy Award for Outstanding Performance in a Children's Special in Maggie's Secret, and in 1994 they received a Genie Award nomination for Best Supporting Actress for the film Love and Human Remains.

Vannicola has also appeared in films and television series such as Common Ground, Girlfriends' Guide to Divorce, Rookie Blue, Slasher, Degrassi, Stardom, Betrayal of Silence, The Ultimate Betrayal, Relic Hunter, Mutant X, Kung Fu: The Legend Continues, Night Heat and Derby. In 2019, they appeared in the Street Legal reboot as Sam, a non-binary supporting character who was planned to have a more prominent storyline in the second season, although the reboot was cancelled after six episodes.

Vannicola received an ACTRA Award nomination for Best Voice Performance in 2009.

They wrote and directed their first short film, SNIP, in 2017.

In 2019, Vannicola published their memoir, All We Knew But Couldn't Say, with Dundurn Press.

== Personal life ==
Vannicola founded a non-profit organization to raise awareness about child abuse, Youth Out Loud, in 2004. An out lesbian prior to coming out as non-binary, Vannicola was a prominent campaigner for same-sex marriage in Canada and is the current chair of outACTRAto, ACTRA's advocacy and support committee for LGBTQ performers.

They hold a certificate from the creative writing program at University of Toronto, and was selected for the Diaspora Dialogues program in Toronto in 2013.

Vannicola came out as non-binary in their 2019 memoir All We Knew But Couldn't Say.

== Filmography ==
=== Film ===
Year	Title	Role	Notes
1982	Hard Feelings	Claudia Hergruder	
1986	Toby McTeague	Parker	
1993	Love and Human Remains	Jerri	
1995	Iron Eagle on the Attack	Wheeler	
1997	Hysteria	Blair	
2000	Stardom	Rosie	
2013	The Animal Project	Morag	
2015	Stonewall	Sam	

=== Television ===
Year	Title	Role	Notes
1976	Sesame Street	Joanne	Recurring role
1986	9B	Mary Neissbrkor	TV film
1987	Taking Care of Terrific	Enid / Cynthia	TV film
1987	Street Legal	Mrs. Flanigan	Episode: "Mr. Nice Guy"
1988	Night Heat	Ella	Episode: "Forgive Me Father"
1988	No Blame	Laura	TV film
1988	Betrayal of Silence	Karen	TV film
1988	T. and T.	Betty	Episode: "And Baby Makes Nine"
1988	Street Legal	Joanie	Episode: "Cat and Mouse"
1989	Men	Kimberly	Episode: "Cupid Ms...Takes"
1989–1990	My Secret Identity	Cassie Martin	Episode: "Secret Code", "Long Shot", "White Lies"
1990	T. and T.	Martina	Episode: "Cry Wolf"
1990	CBS Schoolbreak Special	Maggie Kingston	Episode: "Maggie's Secret"
1991	Katts and Dog	Mariana	Episode: "Desperate Hours"
1991	Tarzán	Nikki Robinson	Episode: "Tarzan and the Killer Lion"
1992–1993	Street Legal	Barbara Jacobson	Episode: "Affairs of the Heart", "Hasta La Vista"
1994	Ultimate Betrayal	Karla	TV film
1994	To Save the Children	Melanie Young	TV film
1995	Derby	Katie Woods	TV film
1996	Kung Fu: The Legend Continues	Claire	Episode: "Phoenix"
1999–2000	Psi Factor	Dr. Mia Stone	Main role (season 4)
2000	Common Ground	Max	TV film
2000	The Stalking of Laurie Show	Tabitha	TV film
2001	The Wandering Soul Murders	Mieka Kilbourn	TV film
2001	What Makes a Family	Melissa	TV film
2002	Relic Hunter	Zanda Wilkes	Episode: "Warlock of the Nu Theta Phi"
2002	Mutant X	Maddie Conlan	Episode: "Double Vision"
2003	Train 48	Sue	Episode: "1.13", "1.40"
2003	In the Dark	Sadie Speller	TV film
2003	Thoughtcrimes	Terri Merriweather	TV film
2009–2011	Being Erica	Dr. Naadiah	Recurring role
2014	Degrassi: The Next Generation	Chef Kaz	Episode: "How Bizarre", "My Hero"
2015	Rookie Blue	Jasmine	Episode: "Ninety Degrees"
2015	Girlfriends' Guide to Divorce		Episode: "Don't Blow the Bubble"
2016	Slasher: The Executioner	Debbie	Episode: "Ill-Gotten Gains"
2017	Sea Change	Nick Colley	TV film
2017	Slasher: Guilty Party	Renée	Main role
2019	Slasher: Solstice	Amber Ciotti	Main role
2019	Street Legal	Sam	
2021–2022	The Expanse	Nico Sanjrani	Recurring role (season 6)
2023	Slasher: Ripper	Enid Jenkins	Main role

=== Voice work ===
Year	Title	Role	Notes
1999	Medabots	Koji Karakuchi	TV series
2000–2001	Timothy Goes to School	Claude	Recurring role
2000–2003	Seven Little Monsters	One	TV series
2001–2003	Beyblade	Various	TV series
2003–2004	My Dad the Rock Star	William "Willy" Zilla	Main role
2005	Gerald McBoing-Boing	Jacob	Main role
2006	Bigfoot Presents: Meteor and the Mighty Monster Trucks	Hook	"Race Relations"
2006	The Great Polar Bear Adventure	Asak	TV film
2007	Bakugan Battle Brawlers	Marucho	TV series
2007–2010	Busytown Mysteries (Hurray for Huckle!)	Huckle	Main role
2008–2009	Toot & Puddle	Toot	Main role
2009	The Dating Guy	Stephanie Stephanie	"Captain Petard"
2010–2012	The Adventures of Chuck & Friends	Biggs	TV series
2011–2013	Crash Canyon	Jake Wendell / Emily Butane	Main role
2011–2016	Super Why!	Woofster	Main role (seasons 2–3)
