= Safer at Home =

2021 American thriller film

- Official release poster
- Directed by: Will Wernick
- Written by: Will Wernick; Lia Bozonelis
- Story by: Will Wernick; John Ierardi; Lia Bozonelis
- Produced by: Bo Youngblood; John Ierardi; Will Wernick
- Starring: Jocelyn Hudon; Alisa Allapach; Dan J. Johnson; Adwin Brown; Daniel Robaire; Emma Lahana; Michael Kupisk
- Cinematography: Jason Goodell
- Edited by: Sean Aylward
- Music by: Genevieve Vincent
- Production companies: Voltage Pictures; 7930 Entertainment; Showdown Productions
- Distributed by: Vertical Entertainment
- Release date: February 26, 2021
- Running time: 82 minutes
- Country: United States
- Language: English
- Box office: $100,323

Safer at Home is a 2021 American supernatural horror thriller film written by Will Wernick and Lia Bozonelis, and directed by Wernick. The film stars Jocelyn Hudon, Emma Lahana, Alisa Allapach, Adwin Brown and Dan J. Johnson.

== Plot ==
Set in the fall of 2022, after the second and third strains of COVID-19 have extended the COVID-19 pandemic death toll to over 31 million in the United States, mass chaos in Los Angeles has turned the city into a police state. Three sets of couples – Ben and Liam in New York City, Evan and Jen in West Hollywood, and Oliver and Mia in Los Angeles' Venice neighborhood – are joined by friend Harper in Austin, Texas, on a four way online birthday party for Evan via Zoom. The group agrees to take a designer drug that Oliver has had delivered to each home. After taking the pill, during a brief verbal argument, Jen falls backward, hits her head and appears to be dead.

As the drugs take a firm hold on the friends, their decision making skills are severely hampered. Fearing that the authorities will think Evan killed her (they themselves are unsure, as none were paying attention to their screens when Jen tripped), the friends help Evan run when a neighbor calls the police. As Oliver drives cross town to Evan, Harper shares that Jen had secretly told her she was pregnant, and planned to tell Evan after the party. Evan reaches his own car and heads for Oliver's, and the group is stunned to see how the pandemic has caused the conditions to deteriorate on the streets of Los Angeles, including military roadblocks.

With Evan having broken the strict curfew, the police escalate a search for him. When the police search Oliver's house, Evan leaves in Oliver's car. Mia convinces Oliver that she should contact her abusive ex-boyfriend, who is a top criminal lawyer. He advises Evan to drive to the Hollywood police station and wait for Danny to arrive, and to say nothing until he gets there. However, he is pulled over by the police before he arrives. Unable to think clearly, and ignoring the advice of Danny and all his friends, Evan disobeys the police orders and gets out of the car, raising his hands with his Zoom enabled phone, leading to Evan being shot.

As Evan lays dying on the street, the feed from Evan and Jen's house shows her regain consciousness and sit up. She and Evan speak of the baby and their love for each other. Evan dies, witnessed by all the friends. Jen screams in agony, as the news radio show in Oliver's car relays that Evan's death is dwarfed by the 2 million Covid deaths that day, bringing the death toll to 253 million, with the United Kingdom becoming the seventh major superpower to cease to exist as a coherent nation.

== Cast ==
- Jocelyn Hudon as Jen
- Alisa Allapach as Harper
- Dan J. Johnson as Evan
- Adwin Brown as Ben
- Daniel Robaire as Liam
- Emma Lahana as Mia
- Michael Kupisk as Oliver

== Production ==
The film was produced by Bo Youngblood and John Ierardi of Showdown Productions, and Will Wernick under his 7930 Entertainment banner.

== Release ==
Voltage Pictures sold the distribution rights to the film in the United States to Vertical Entertainment, which release in limited theatres and for VOD platforms on February 26, 2021.

== Reception ==
On Rotten Tomatoes, the film has a 7% approval rating, based on 14 reviews, with an average rating of 3.7/10. On Metacritic, the film has a weighted average score of 35 out of 100 based on 5 critics indicating "mixed or average reviews".
