= The Last Victim (book) =

1999 non-fiction work

The Last Victim: A True-Life Journey into the Mind of the Serial Killer
- Author: Jason Moss, Jeffrey Kottler
- Language: English
- Genre: Non-fiction
- Publication date: 1999

The Last Victim: A True-Life Journey into the Mind of the Serial Killer (1999) is a non-fiction work by author Jason Moss, co-authored with counseling professor Jeffrey Kottler, in which he details his fascination and subsequent correspondence with several notorious American serial killers.

== Synopsis ==
In 1994, Moss was an 18-year-old college student at UNLV. While studying for his honors thesis, he established relationships by correspondence with John Wayne Gacy, Richard Ramirez, Henry Lee Lucas, Jeffrey Dahmer, Elmer Wayne Henley, and Charles Manson. He obtained samples of correspondence from and interviews with these men. Moss researched what would most interest each subject, and cast himself in the role of disciple, admirer, surrogate, or potential victim.

In his book Moss said that he had been interested in a career with the FBI. He thought that gaining the trust of a serial killer, possibly learning more about their stated crimes or unsolved murders, was a way to distinguish himself as a job candidate.

Moss claims to have forged the strongest relationship with Gacy; their letters led to regular Sunday morning phone calls, during which Gacy reiterated his innocence even as he gave Moss a guided tour of his world. In the book, Moss recounts his correspondence and eventual two meetings with Gacy about two months before the killer was executed. Moss believed that he became Gacy's "last victim" after his face-to-face meeting in prison, in essence being psychologically overpowered by the manipulative, depraved sociopath. He claims, prison officials left him alone and unsupervised with Gacy for two consecutive days and he alleges that Gacy repeatedly threatened to rape and murder him. For a time he suffered nightmares from the encounter. Moss felt that this misadventure allowed him to understand how a killer's mind works in controlling the vulnerable and forcing them to submission. He based the title of his book on this episode.

== Reception ==
The book became a bestseller, selling 76,000 copies in its first 10 weeks. In 2000 the paperback edition also appeared on the Bestseller List of the New York Times.

Sales were boosted by controversy over Moss's methods. The author was interviewed on TV's 20/20 and Hard Copy, and radio's The Howard Stern Show. People argued whether Moss was exploiting the lurid histories of these killers or whether he contributed to studies of criminal psychology.

Jason Moss died by suicide in June 2006. His co-author Kottler said that he had given no indication of distress.

== Film adaptation ==
A film adaptation of the book, titled Dear Mr. Gacy, was released in 2010, starring Jesse Moss (no relation) as Jason Moss, and William Forsythe as John Wayne Gacy.
