= Cartoonito (American programming block) =

Former American children's programming block

- Country: United States
- Broadcast area: Nationwide
- Network: Cartoon Network
- Headquarters: Atlanta, Georgia, U.S.

Programming
- Languages: English; Spanish (with SAP)
- Picture format: 1080i HDTV (downscaled to letterboxed 480i for the SDTV feed)

Ownership
- Owner: Warner Bros. Discovery Networks
- Parent: The Cartoon Network, Inc.
- Key people: Michael Ouweleen (president)
- Sister channels: List: Adult Swim; Boomerang; Cartoon Network; American Heroes Channel; Animal Planet; Cinemax; CNN; Cooking Channel; The CW; Destination America; Discovery Channel; Discovery Familia; Discovery Family; Discovery Life; Food Network; HBO; HGTV; Investigation Discovery; Magnolia Network; Oprah Winfrey Network; Science Channel; TBS; TLC; TNT; Travel Channel; TruTV; Turner Classic Movies

History
- Launched: September 13, 2021; 4 years ago
- Closed: May 23, 2025; 15 months ago

Links
- Website: www.max.com/channel/cartoon-network

Cartoonito (also known as Cartoonito on Cartoon Network) was an American weekday morning programming block on Cartoon Network and a content hub within the HBO Max streaming service that launched on September 13, 2021. It aired series aimed at children aged 2 through 6 and was the first dedicated preschool block to air on Cartoon Network in over fifteen years. The programming block ceased operations on May 23, 2025.

== History ==
=== Background ===
In 1996, Cartoon Network created a Sunday morning block of preschool programs, consisting of Big Bag, a live-action/puppet television program by the Children's Television Workshop, and Small World, an anthology of foreign children's shows. Big Bag and Small World moved to the 11:00 a.m. ET hour on weekday mornings in 1998 before moving back to Sunday mornings later that year. After Big Bag and Small World left Cartoon Network's lineup in 2001 and 2002 respectively, an unbranded preschool block on weekday mornings consisting of Baby Looney Tunes, Pecola, Sitting Ducks, and Hamtaro was created during the 2002-03 television season.

On August 22, 2005, Cartoon Network debuted Tickle-U, the network's first official attempt at weekday-morning preschool programming block. The block aired from 9 to 11 a.m. and featured a mix of domestic and foreign-imported series, with interstitial segments hosted by two CGI characters: a red butterfly-like creature named Pipoca (voiced by Ariel Winter) and a yellow rabbit-like creature named Henderson (voiced by Tom Kenny).

Programs on Tickle-U included Warner Bros. Animation's Firehouse Tales (its sole original series), Canadian co-productions Gerald McBoing-Boing and Harry and His Bucket Full of Dinosaurs (with Teletoon and Treehouse TV), and British series Gordon the Garden Gnome, Little Robots, Peppa Pig and Yoko! Jakamoko! Toto!, some of which were re-dubbed for American audiences. The block was criticized by the CCFC, for its marketing strategies. Tickle-U ended on January 13, 2006; some of its programs still aired on Cartoon Network until a year later and in the United Kingdom on the native Cartoonito channel.

=== Launch ===
On June 14, 2021, Cartoonito's YouTube channel uploaded videos featuring new idents of the block's programs (which included Esme & Roy, Mush-Mush & the Mushables, Care Bears: Unlock the Magic, and Love Monster), and a newsletter was announced, with a new banner and avatar on the Cartoonito YouTube Channel in July. A trailer for the block was released on July 29, 2021.

=== Scheduling ===
The block, originally eight hours in length between 6:00 a.m. to 2:00 p.m. ET/PT weekdays and two hours (6:00 a.m. to 8:00 a.m. ET/PT) on weekends, premiered on September 13, 2021 with an episode of Baby Looney Tunes. From there, the block would lose time due to viewer and ratings feedback, with the 1:00 p.m. hour returning to Cartoon Network on November 16 of the same year, then the noon hour on December 20. The weekend schedule was entirely retired on January 29, 2022, followed by the 11:00 a.m. to 12:00 noon block two days later.

Through the summer of 2022, the block ended at 11:00 a.m. until the resumption of the academic year on September 5. A month later on October 3, the 6:00 a.m. hour was abandoned for Cartoon Network content, leaving it as a four-hour block going into 2023. It underwent two additional cuts, with 2½ hours removed on March 13 with a new 9:00 a.m. endtime, then another 30 minutes cut on February 19, 2024, resulting in the block airing for only 60 minutes between 7:30 a.m.–8:30 a.m. until its closure on May 23, 2025.

== Programming ==
Cartoonito featured co-productions and acquired programming, in addition to original series exclusive to the program block on Cartoon Network. Cartoonito's lineup included Bugs Bunny Builders, Batwheels, and Jessica's Big Little World; with Sesame Street exclusive to HBO Max.

== Related services ==
Service	Description
Cartoonito on Demand	A video-on-demand service, which launched concurrently in 2021, and was available to most subscription-based providers. The service offers select episodes of Cartoonito programming seen on Cartoon Network.
Cartoonito App	An online mobile app based on the Cartoonito website.
Max	A subscription video-on-demand hub that launched on HBO Max.

== International ==
Since its inception in the United States, Boomerang has rebranded as Cartoonito across European territories through various nations and regional feeds. Following its global reintroduction in 2021, the brand has expanded to regions such as Latin America, Africa, and several Asia-Pacific countries.

== See also ==
- Cartoon Network
- Boomerang
- Discovery Family
- Tiny TV
- Max
- BabyFirst
- BabyTV
- Disney Junior
- Nick Jr. Channel
- Noggin
- Universal Kids
