= Dear Mr. Gacy =

2010 Canadian thriller

- Based on: The Last Victim by Jason Moss; Jeffrey Kottler
- Screenplay by: Kellie Madison
- Story by: Clark Peterson
- Directed by: Svetozar Ristovski
- Starring: Jesse Moss; William Forsythe; Emma Lahana; Jeffrey Bowyer-Chapman; Patrick Gilmore
- Theme music composer: Terry Frewer
- Country of origin: Canada
- Original language: English

Production
- Producers: Clark Peterson; Tom Berry; Gordon Yang
- Cinematography: Larry Lynn
- Editor: Scott Belyea
- Running time: 103 minutes

Original release
- Release: May 11, 2010

Dear Mr. Gacy is a 2010 Canadian thriller drama film directed by Svetozar Ristovski, and starring William Forsythe and Jesse Moss. The film is based on Jason Moss's memoir The Last Victim.

== Plot ==
As part of his college thesis, Jason Moss (Jesse Moss), a criminology student, decides to write to John Wayne Gacy and attempt to gain his trust through impersonating a typical victim or admirer.

Moss sends a carefully crafted letter to Gacy (William Forsythe) in prison, portraying himself as a vulnerable, sexually confused boy. The letter is an intricate plan to get inside Gacy's head in hopes of uncovering new information regarding his murders that will aid Moss in writing a standout term paper.

The film unfolds as Gacy, suspicious at first, puts Moss through intense emotional tests via letters and collect calls, all of which leads to strained relationships with his girlfriend and family. Gacy tries to convince Moss to become a hustler, and Moss lies about having his wallet stolen by a client. After hearing that, Gacy offers to have the man's penis cut off, saying he is very protective of people he is close to. Gacy even asks Moss to convince his younger brother, Alex, to send Gacy a letter, and suggests that Moss molest the boy after hearing he gets beat up a lot. That makes Jason avoid Gacy's calls for a few days, making Gacy angry and suspicious that he is writing to another inmate.

Meanwhile, Jason grows increasingly paranoid and aggressive under Gacy's influence; he inflicts a savage beating on a classmate who had been bullying his younger brother, and hires a prostitute with the intent of assaulting her, stopping himself only at the last moment.

Once Gacy hears that his last appeal failed and he will be executed soon, he offers to pay for Jason to visit him in prison. Jason agrees after getting a call from the warden, who says the two will not be in the same room and there will be guards. Jason also speaks to a victim of Gacy's who escaped, who does not want him to go. After Jason arrives, he finds out he will be in the same room with Gacy and the guard leaves. Gacy shows Jason piles of letters he received from the media and admirers. Gacy gets angry when Moss refuses the strawberry shortcake Gacy ordered for him. Gacy begins threatening Jason and then sits back down and starts acting like the two are friends again. After more conversation, Gacy says he is going to rape and kill Jason, and shoves him against the wall. The guards watching the security cameras see this, but think the pair are simply kissing, and turn away because they do not want to watch them having sex. The guards finally arrive a few minutes after Jason yells for them.

Gacy calls Jason again, and threatens to tell everyone that he molested his brother. Jason then tells Gacy he was just studying him for school. Gacy is executed soon afterwards and Jason speaks to the faculty at the college he attends about his relationship with Gacy.

The film ends with a real-life interview with the real Jason Moss, and shows the real photo taken of Jason and Gacy several days before the execution, stating that Moss went on to graduate and write a book on his relationship with Gacy before dying by suicide in June 2006.

== Cast ==
- Jesse Moss as Jason Moss
- William Forsythe as John Wayne Gacy
- Emma Lahana as Alyssa
- Jeffrey Bowyer-Chapman as Diego
- Patrick Gilmore as Glen Phillips
- Andrew Airlie as Professor Harris
- Cole Heppell as Alex Moss
- Belinda Metz as Valerie
- Michaela Mann as Autumn
- Michael Kopsa as FBI Agent
- Eric Keenleyside as Stan
- Daryl Shuttleworth as Thompson
- Brett Dier as Marcus
- Jaren Brandt-Bartlett as Mike
- Hunter Elliott as Tim Carsey
- Kai Kennedy as Bobby

== Production ==
The film based on the real-life story of Jason Moss, who as a college student attending UNLV, corresponded with five prominent serial killers on death row in an attempt to determine if there was more to be learned if one was to impersonate their typical victims or act as an ardent admirer.

The focus of the film is Moss' interaction with John Wayne Gacy (convicted of murdering 33 young men and boys), with whom he developed the strongest relationship.

Screenwriter Kellie Madison approached Clark Peterson, executive producer of Monster, to attempt to bring the story to life. It was during the course of their discussions with Moss, who was thrilled at the prospect of developing his novel The Last Victim into a film, that they learned of his suicide on June 6, 2006. After an appropriate period of time had passed, they approached Moss’ widow and ultimately were able to gain acceptance of the proposal, and Dear Mr. Gacy was developed. This is Kellie Madison's first adaptation to the big screen. The film was shot in Vancouver, British Columbia.

== Release ==
Dear Mr. Gacy premiered on Canadian TV on May 11, 2010, and was released on video later in the year.

== See also ==
- Serial killers
- True crime
- The Last Victim
