= Iron Invader =

2011 television film directed by Paul Ziller

- Promotional image
- Screenplay by: Paul Ziller; Gary Hawes
- Story by: Paul Ziller
- Directed by: Paul Ziller
- Starring: Kavan Smith; Nicole de Boer; Jesse Moss
- Music by: Christopher Nickel
- Country of origin: Canada
- Original language: English

Production
- Executive producers: Tom Berry; Lisa Hansen; Paul Hertzberg
- Producer: John Prince
- Cinematography: Anthony C. Metchie
- Editor: Christopher A. Smith
- Running time: 106 min (estimated)
- Production companies: CineTel Films; Reel One Entertainment

Original release
- Network: Syfy
- Release: February 12, 2011

Iron Invader (also known as Iron Golem and Metal Shifters) is a 2011 science fiction television film directed by Paul Ziller. The drama features Kavan Smith and Nicole de Boer. The film premiered on the Syfy channel on February 12, 2011.

== Plot ==
A meteorite hits a satellite, causing it to crash in a little town. A man named Greg Aupolous sees this and takes a piece, not noticing the green goo on it. The goo spreads to his hand, causing his veins to pop on his face, killing him. Jake (Kavan Smith) and his younger brother Ethan are building an inn. Seeing the falling satellite, they retrieve it, wrap it up and take it to local scuptor Earl.

Earl, who is working on a sculpture called Iron Golem, buys the satellite wreck for $800. As Earl works on his statue, the infected pieces from the satellite fly onto the statue, spreading the goo on it. The gigantic statue springs to life, knocking Earl unconscious. A nearby trucker's truck malfunctions, who stops to check it. The alien goo kills him.

On their way from the market, Jake and Ethan see Jake's old high school sweetheart Amanda (Nicole de Boer) and her daughter Claire (Merrit Patterson). Amanda, who is separated from her husband, plans to stay at her aunt's house. The Iron Golem finds Amanda's aunt's house and attacks, killing the aunt. Amanda and Claire flee to find the sheriff.

While Jake goes to send a finder's fee to Greg's house, the Golem comes to the inn and kills Ethan. Jake returns to find Ethan dead and sees Iron walking away. As Jake alerts the sheriff, Earl, having gained consciousness and heard reports on his radio, drives to the inn. The town coroner checks Ethan's body and finds that his arteries and veins were infected and swelled.

Jake prepares to hunt the Golem. The sheriff returns to the police station where Amanda and Claire approach him.

Soon, lights all around begin to flicker. Inside the local pub, Max, bartender Tony (Chris Gauthier), and Harry see this too along with Earl in his car which suddenly died. Out the window, Tony sees Amanda, Claire and the sheriff, along with Iron coming their way. Claire turns and runs while Iron chases her. Claire falls and gets a bloody forehead. Right before Iron grabs her, Max appears and helps her escape. Jake returns in his car and sees Iron. Jake attempts to ram Iron until his car dies as well, but he managed to break off Iron's leg, causing it to fall apart. The infected pieces are still alive however, and one of them grabs the sheriff and kills him. Jake gets Amanda and they and Earl hide in the pub with Tony and Harry.

The kids run into Deputy Jenny (Chelah Horsdal), who doesn't believe the kids, who goes to see and have the kids locked in her car. While crying over the dead sheriff, Jenny is infected and dies. In the inn, the adults examine the goo covering only the blade of an ax and find out that the goo is an alien bacteria that feeds off metal, sucking the metal from human blood (humans have metal/iron in their blood) and killing them. Outside, Iron puts himself back together, and Claire and Max are still locked in Jenny's dead car (it was revealed that Iron causes static electricity and effect electronics which make the car inoperable) as Iron tries to grab Claire. She is touched, but not harmed.

In the inn, they discover that, with blood, they can trick Iron into exploding. Jake and Amanda get gasoline and cover the tank with Amanda's vein blood. They plan to shoot it when Iron is close enough. With the blood, Iron is still worried about Claire. So Amanda unwraps her arm, releasing her scent of blood, attracting Iron. Max then escapes out of the car.

In the inn, the infected metal ax blade puts itself into Tony's leg, killing him. Harry and Earl go through different anti-bacterial things but to no avail. But when Earl goes outside to check on Max and Amanda reenters the pub, a beer bottle spills on it and begins to dissolve. Harry then realizes that the bacteria hates alcohol when he accidentally drops his glass on the axe-head, so he and Amanda run outside with it.

Iron gets close to the gasoline, Jake shoots, and he explodes. Pieces fly everywhere, knocking out Max, Earl, and Jake. A flamed piece lands on the hood of Jenny's car, and Claire barely escapes. Although a big explosion, the Pieces are still alive. Claire runs over to Max and tries to wake him up. Jake puts the beer into a spray container, and begins to spray the Pieces, killing the flames and the bacteria, while the others throw beer bottles. A little car engine makes its way to Max. Before it can infect him, Amanda appears and sprays it down. The mother and daughter are reunited. Max awakens and hugs Claire.

The next morning, Jake, Amanda, and Earl go to the junkyard to crush the pieces. While doing so, Earl releases his special beer, and the three share it. Jake says the government didn't believe the story and they are coming to arrest him. Outside, he and Amanda share a kiss. Earl comes out, just in time to see the metal springing back to life, forcing Earl to break the special bottle in order to stop the last fragment. When Amanda asks if he has any more special beer to douse the yard and ensure the bacteria's destruction, he pauses, then says "Do bears crap in the woods?", a phrase he said early in the film.

== Cast ==
- Kavan Smith as Jake Hampton
- Colby Johannson as Ethan Hampton
- Nicole de Boer as Amanda Spelling
- Merritt Patterson as Claire Spelling
- Jesse Moss as Max
- Donnelly Rhodes as Earl
- Paul McGillion as Sheriff Bill
- Chelah Horsdal as Deputy Jenny
- Don Thompson as Harry
- Chris Gauthier as Tony
- Alvin Sanders as Coroner
- Scott McNeil as Cowboy
- Mark McConchie as Farmer Steve Gregoropoulos
