= Little Red Tractor =

- Genre: Children's television series
- Created by: Colin Reeder
- Directed by: Russell Haigh
- Voices of: Stephen Tompkinson; Derek Griffiths; Jimmy Hibbert; Shireen Shah; Florence Jones; Stewart Majkowski; Euan Dick
- Theme music composer: Michael Cross; Stan Cullimore
- Country of origin: United Kingdom
- Original language: English
- No. of series: 3
- No. of episodes: 78

Production
- Producer: Keith Littler
- Editor: Fred Tay
- Running time: 10 minutes per episode (approx.)
- Production companies: The Little Entertainment Company; TRACK Productions Limited (Seasons 1-2); Entertainment Rights (Series 1-2)

Original release
- Network: CBeebies
- Release: 5 January 2004 – 29 April 2007

Little Red Tractor is a British stop motion animated children's television series produced by The Little Entertainment Company and was co-produced by Entertainment Rights for the first two series. The ten-minute episodes were broadcast in the United Kingdom by the BBC on the CBeebies channel.

Produced in stop motion model animation, the series is mainly aimed at preschoolers and features unusually detailed sets and models. The series features the popular voices of Stephen Tompkinson and Derek Griffiths. The characters are based on the books by Colin Reeder, which were narrated for video in the mid 1990s by Brian Glover and Richard Briers.

== History ==
Little Red Tractor Projects Limited owned the original Little Red Tractor video series. Although it didn't have television exposure, Little Red Tractor broke into the top ten children's videos and stayed there for several weeks. In total, the original series sold over 300,000 copies. Contender the distributor wanted to duplicate that success. However, the television rights were sold to Keith Littler's Little Entertainment Group because Peter Tye, the director/writer of the series, preferred their expertise in stop frame animation and empathy with the original. Despite losing the television rights to Little Red Tractor, Contender went ahead and produced their similar series, CITV's Tractor Tom. Despite apparent similarities to Tractor Tom, Little Red Tractor has a completely different style, with more realistic story-lines, a larger human cast, and no surreal livestock behaviour.

== Characters ==
- Stan (voiced by Stephen Tompkinson) is Little Red Tractor's driver and constant companion. Stan lives at Gosling Farm, and keeps two cows Daisy and Veronica, and two pigs.
- Little Red Tractor (leader) is a small and old but reliable red-coloured farm tractor, mute but capable of expressing emotions. Stan restored him to his farm as in new condition.
- Patch is Stan's dog. In the television series, Patch is depicted as a male, whereas in the original stories, Patch is depicted as a female.
- Mr. Jones (voiced by Derek Griffiths) is Stan's neighbour and owner of Big Blue Tractor and Harvey. He often appears selfish, materialistic or otherwise antisocial, but tends to be socially inept or smug rather than actually unpleasant. His first name is revealed to be Jasper and he lives at Beech Farm.
- Big Blue Tractor (co-leader) is a large, updated, blue-coloured farm tractor owned by Mr. Jones. He has no humanised traits, but can blow his horn by himself. In the original stories he was named Big Fred.
- Harvey is an orange-coloured combine harvester owned by Mr. Jones but sometimes borrowed by Stan.
- Thomas is Mr. Jones' nephew who comes to stay at Beech farm with him on occasion since Mr. Jones' sister moved back from the city to the country. Thomas is learning to like the country life which he initially thought was smelly, dirty and not as good as computer games.
- Stumpy (voiced by Jimmy Hibbert) is the miller. He appears friendly, mildly eccentric and clumsy. He drives his quadbike, "Nipper" very badly. Stumpy plays in Walter's band.
- Elsie is Stumpy's wife.
- Nipper is a purple-coloured quadbike ridden by Stumpy.
- Ryan is the youngest neighbour of Stan. He and his sister like to play with Little Red Tractor and help out.
- Amy is Ryan's sister.
- Mr. Turvey (voiced by Jimmy Hibbert) is Ryan and Amy's father. He likes to run and plays keyboards in Walter's band.
- Mrs. Turvey (voiced by Shireen Shah) is Ryan and Amy's mother. She likes to paint and does arts and crafts.
- Walter (voiced by Derek Griffiths) is an African-British mechanic who runs the Babblebrook garage and likes to play rock and roll. Walter is easily led astray. Walter is lead singer and plays the guitar for his band called Walter and the Wolverines.
- Nicola (voiced by Shireen Shah) is Walter's daughter who also runs the garage. She tends to be far more sensible than her father. Nicola also plays an instrument in her father's band.
- Leo is Walter's nephew, becomes a friend of Ryan and Amy. He is a more than competent drummer who stands in for Nicola in Walter's Band.
- Sparky is a yellow and blue-coloured tow truck which Nicola and Walter drive.
- Rusty is Walter's burgundy-coloured unreliable car and restoration project who unfortunately breaks down regularly.

== Episodes ==
=== Series 1 (2004) ===
- 1. The Big Bang
- 2. The Ladder
- 3. The Gold Cup
- 4. Little Red Tractor's Birthday
- 5. Dog Gone
- 6. The Lucky Day
- 7. Berries
- 8. Mr. Fixit
- 9. Flying
- 10. The Garage Sale
- 11. Tiger, Tiger
- 12. The Windy Day
- 13. Farm of the Year
- 14. Making Hay
- 15. The Silence of the Cows
- 16. The Big Sneeze
- 17. The Secret Den
- 18. Mr. Big
- 19. The Detectives
- 20. Roof Tops
- 21. Winter Lights
- 22. The Dam
- 23. Bye Bye, Blue
- 24. Enter the Dragon
- 25. Water Water
- 26. The Party

=== Series 2 (2005) ===
- 27. The Beast of Babble-Brook
- 28. The New Engine
- 29. The Town Boy
- 30. Circles in the Corn
- 31. Spuds
- 32. Little Red Rocker
- 33. Glorious Mud
- 34. The New Addition
- 35. The Tree House
- 36. Traction Trouble
- 37. Gone With the Wind
- 38. Llama Drama
- 39. Read All About It
- 40. Marrow Mangler
- 41. Buried Treasure
- 42. The Ghost of Tawny Owl Wood
- 43. The Beech Farm Flyer
- 44. Paper Chase
- 45. Molehills and Windmills
- 46. May Day
- 47. Scrambled Eggs
- 48. Farm Games
- 49. Double Trouble
- 50. Hot Hot Hot
- 51. Cheesed Off
- 52. Magic Hat

=== Series 3 (2007) ===
- 53. Thunder and Dancing
- 54. Row Yer Boat
- 55. Lost!
- 56. Up, Up and Away
- 57. One Potato, Two Potato
- 58. The Show Must Go On
- 59. Too Cold for Snow
- 60. Furry Jumper
- 61. Topsy Turvey
- 62. The Map
- 63. The Hill
- 64. Run
- 65. Movie Madness
- 66. Kart Race
- 67. What's Up, Duck?
- 68. Rambling Rabbits
- 69. Milkshake
- 70. Electric Trickery
- 71. An Unwanted Tractor
- 72. Raindance
- 73. Bubblegum
- 74. Countryside Code
- 75. Welcome Home

== Home media ==
Several DVD releases of the series have been released. The first five releases were also on VHS as well.

DVD/VHS name	Season	Episodes	Release date	Distributor	Source
Let's Go!	One	"Big Bang" "Garage Sale" "Tiger Tiger" "Ladder" "Making Hay" "Windy Day"	25 October 2004	Right Entertainment; Universal Pictures Video	
Winter Lights	One	"Winter Lights" "Farm of the Year" "Mr Fixit" "Lucky Day" "Gold Cup" "Flying"	29 November 2004	Right Entertainment; Universal Pictures Video	
Happy Birthday	One	"Happy Birthday" "Berries" "The Dam" "Silence of the Cows" "Secret Den" "Mr Big"	18 April 2005	Right Entertainment; Universal Pictures Video	
Enter the Dragon	One	"Enter the Dragon" "The Big Sneeze" "The Detectives" "Roof Tops" "Dog Gone" "Bye Bye Blue"	18 July 2005	Right Entertainment; Universal Pictures Video	
Glorious Mud	Two	"Glorious Mud" "Water Water" "Beast of Babblebrook" "Town Boy" "Circles in the Corn" "Spuds"	31 October 2005	Right Entertainment; Universal Pictures Video	
Hot Hot Hot	Two	"Hot Hot Hot" "The New Engine" "Little Red Rocker" "The New Addition" "The Treehouse" "Traction Trouble" "Marrow Mangler" "Buried Treasure" "The Ghost of Tawny Owl Wood" "Beech Farm Flyer" "Paperchase" "Molehills and Windmills"	16 April 2007	Right Entertainment; Universal Pictures Video	
One Potato, Two Potato...	Three	"Thunder and Lightning" "Row Yer Boat" "Lost" "Up, Up and Away" "One Potato, Two Potato..." "The Show Must Go On"	21 July 2008	Revelation Films Ltd	
Topsy Turvey	Three	"Furry Jumper" "Topsy Turvy" "The Map" "Run!!" "Movie Madness" "The Hill"	19 April 2010	Revelation Films Ltd	
Down on the Farm	Three	"The Show Must Go On" "Up, Up and Away" "Furry Jumper" "The Map" "The Hill" "Electric Trickery" "Raindance" "Welcome Home"	31 August 2015	Abbey Home Media	
Der Stromausfall	Three	"Kart Race" "What’s Up, Duck?" "Rambling Rabbits" "Milkshake" "Electric Trickery" "An Unwanted Tractor"	Unknown	Kids Universum	
Landleben	Three	"Raindance" "Bubblegum" "Too Cold for Snow" "Countryside Code" "Welcome Home"	Unknown	Kids Universum	
