= The Adventures of Bottle Top Bill and His Best Friend Corky =

Australian computer-animated children's television series

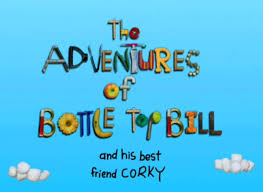
- Genre: Children's television series
- Directed by: Cameron Chittock; Craig Handley
- Voices of: Emma Jane Hyland; Graham Matters; Jamie Oxenboud; Justin Rosniak
- Music by: Doug Gray
- Opening theme: "The Adventures of Bottle Top Bill and his Best Friend Corky" by Doug Gray
- Ending theme: "The Adventures of Bottle Top Bill and his Best Friend Corky" (instrumental)
- Countries of origin: Australia; United Kingdom; Singapore
- Original language: English
- No. of seasons: 4
- No. of episodes: 104

Production
- Running time: 12 minutes
- Production companies: Southern Star Entertainment; Economic Development Board of Singapore; New South Wales Film and Television Office

Original release
- Network: ABC; Five
- Release: 8 August 2005 – 20 April 2009

The Adventures of Bottle Top Bill and His Best Friend Corky is an Australian animated children's television series that first aired on ABC Kids on 8 August 2005 to 20 April 2009, while also airing on Milkshake!, a program block on Channel 5 in the United Kingdom. The animation is a mixture of CGI, 2D and stop motion.

== Series synopsis ==
Bottle Top Bill is a man who lives in a town called Junkyardville with his best friend Corky, a horse. The characters and surroundings are made up from everyday bits and pieces, the kind of things someone might throw away without even trying to recycle them, like old boxes, tape, wire mesh and paper. That is why people call the place Junkyardville. Bottle Top Bill and Corky find themselves in different surroundings and meet strange new characters each episode. The stories happen anywhere from ancient Egypt, mythological Greece, the Wild West, to under the sea or in outer space.

== Interactive ==
The series and website are designed to encourage children (3 to 6 years) to develop their imaginations and creativity by using things they can find around the home.

== Episodes ==
Series	Episodes	Originally released	
Series	Episodes	First released	Last released
1	26	8 August 2005	TBA
2	26	TBA	TBA
3	26	TBA	TBA
4	26	TBA	20 April 2009

== International ==
Other international broadcast dub included:

- United Kingdom: Milkshake! on Channel 5, Disney Junior (formerly Playhouse Disney)
- Canada: Kidoodle TV, TVOKids, Family Jr. (Formerly Playhouse Disney Channel And Disney Junior), Disney Jr. (Relaunch) (Formerly Disney Junior)
- Ireland: RTÉ Two
- Australia: ABC1, ABC2, ABC Kids, Disney Junior (formerly Playhouse Disney)
- Philippines: Cartoon Network
- India: Pogo
- Latin America: Boomerang
- Brasil: Boomerang, TV Brasil
- New Zealand: TVNZ Kidzone, Disney Junior (Formerly Playhouse Disney)
- Singapore: Kids Central, Okto

== See also ==
- Quotations related to The Adventures of Bottle Top Bill and His Best Friend Corky at Wikiquote
