= Gerald McBoing-Boing (TV series) =

- Created by: Dr. Seuss (original series)
- Based on: Gerald McBoing Boing by Dr. Seuss
- Developed by: John Derevlany; Robin Budd
- Voices of: Glenn Barna; Linda Ballantyne; Patrick McKenna; Samantha Weinstein; Jo Vannicola
- Narrated by: Deann DeGruijter
- Composers: Tom Szczesniak; Ray Parker
- Countries of origin: Canada; United States
- Original language: English
- No. of seasons: 1
- No. of episodes: 26 (52 segments)

Production
- Executive producers: Michael Hirsh; Lesley Taylor; Evan Baily
- Producers: John Vandervelde; Stephen Hodgins; Clint Eland
- Running time: 22 minutes (11 minutes per segment) (approx. per episode)
- Production companies: Cookie Jar Entertainment; Classic Media; Dr. Seuss Enterprises

Original release
- Network: Cartoon Network (Tickle-U)
- Release: August 22, 2005 – November 28, 2007
- Network: Teletoon
- Release: August 29, 2005

Related
- 1950 short; The Wubbulous World of Dr. Seuss; The Cat in the Hat Knows a Lot About That!; Green Eggs and Ham; Go, Dog. Go!

Gerald McBoing-Boing is a flash-animated children's television series based on the 1950 animated short film Gerald McBoing-Boing, that aired on Cartoon Network in the United States (as part of their then-Tickle-U programming block) from August 22, 2005 to November 28, 2007 and on Teletoon in Canada (premiering on the latter on August 29, 2005), later airing in reruns on Boomerang around 2007. It also aired on ABC Kids in Australia. It is produced by Cookie Jar Group and Classic Media, with animation provided by Mercury Filmworks.

It uses the same basic art style as the original except more detailed: each 11-minute episode features a series of vignettes with Gerald, of what the "fantasy tales" are done in Seussian rhyme. Sound checks, gags, and "real-life" portions of the show are also included. Gerald still only makes sounds (and, unlike the UPA specials, is actually praised for it), but he now has two speaking friends, Janine and Jacob, as well as a dog named Burp, who only burps (accompanied by someone, usually Gerald's mother, saying "excuse me" afterwards). Gerald's parents (names unknown) also fill out the regular cast.

Each episode was directed by Robin Budd and story edited/written by John Derevlany. The music and score for the series was composed by Ray Parker and Tom Szczesniak. 26 episodes (52 segments) were produced.

== Cast ==
- Glenn Barna (vocal effects) as Gerald
- Linda Ballantyne as Gerald's Mother
- Patrick McKenna as Gerald's Father
- Samantha Weinstein as Janine
- Jo Vannicola as Jacob
- Deann DeGruijter as Narrator

== Episodes ==
1. "Cuckoos & Pirates"/"Parades, Honking & Mumbling Mummies"
2. "Monkeys, Wrestling & The World's Greatest Super Spy"/"The Dentist, The Sheep & The Two Anniversary Gifts"
3. "Ghosts, Owls & An Evil Witch"/"Art, Glass & The Deep Dark Jungle"
4. "Carnivals, Phones & Sneezing Dragons"/"Cars, Bees & Magic Puppies"
5. "Good Deeds, Librarians & Aliens"/"Tornado, Chicken & Circus"
6. "Burp, Cry Baby Blues & The Return of Scritchy McBeard"/"Videos, Cats & Superheroes"
7. "Dog Tricks, Spare Change & The Lost Snowmen"/"Mini-Golf, Checkers & Bad Manners"
8. "Swings, Cans & The Flying Ace"/"Photos, Radios & Knights"
9. "Hot Rod, Elevators & Genie Meanie"/"Cheese, Birds & Cave Kids"
10. "Escapes, Hide-N-Seek & The Beanstalk"/"Haircuts, Opera & The Albino Alligator"
11. "Camping, Watchdogs & Janinerella"/"Hardware, Hair & Hairy Weather"
12. "Thin Ice, Squeaky Shoes & Leprechauns"/"Museum, Coyotes & A Race Around the World"
13. "Hopscotch, Hugs & Hunchbacks"/"Lost Dogs, Horses & Monsters"
14. "Sleepover, Chalkboard & Trojan Cow"/"Popcorn, Shadows & 20,000 Boings Under the Sea"
15. "Burping Hero, Dog Whistle & The Incredible Shrinking Gerald"/"Play, Cleaning & The Royal Crown Quest"
16. "Telescopes, Hiccups & The Boing Boing Express"/"Book Clubs, Broccoli & The Mighty Ding Dong"
17. "Loud, Drive-thru & Ben Hur"/"Stings, Beeps & Pings"
18. "Monsters, Snowblowers & The Planet Bedtime"/"Fairs, Mimes & Dragons"
19. "Doctor, Pigeons & Gerald McShakespeare"/"Baby Sister, Chalk & King Gerald"
20. "Ice, Fog & Wolves"/"Auctions, Soda Pop & The Surfing Thief"
21. "Karate, Slurps & Wrinklystiltskin"/"Tap-Dancing, Convertibles & The Three Musketeers"
22. "Magic, Showers & Mermaids"/"Lunchboxes, Car Wash & Robot Jacob"
23. "Planes, Parrots & Party Clothes"/"Growls, Paper & Flying Horses"
24. "Fish, Skis & Rocket Ships"/"Rockstar, Strongman & Name that Sound"
25. "Sports, Banks & Queen Long Big Nose the Third"/"Pinball, Parks & Princesses"
26. "Red Light, Rain & Sneezing Flowers"/"Arcades, Scanners & News"
