= Firehouse Tales =

Television series

- Genre: Adventure; Comedy; Musical; Preschool
- Created by: Sidney J. Bailey
- Directed by: Kathi Castillo
- Voices of: Jesse Moss; Michael Adamthwaite; Richard Cox
- Narrated by: French Tickner
- Theme music composer: Tim Kelly
- Opening theme: "Firehouse Tales Theme"
- Ending theme: "Firehouse Tales Theme" (instrumental)
- Composer: Tim Kelly
- Country of origin: United States
- Original language: English
- No. of seasons: 1
- No. of episodes: 26 (78 segments)

Production
- Executive producers: Sidney J. Bailey; Sander Schwartz
- Producer: Ken Kessel
- Editor: Myra Owyang
- Running time: 11 minutes (whole); 6 minutes (segments)
- Production company: Warner Bros. Animation

Original release
- Network: Cartoon Network
- Release: August 22, 2005 – June 7, 2006

Firehouse Tales is an American animated children's television series created by Sidney J. Bailey, produced by Warner Bros. Animation as the only original series for Cartoon Network's now-defunct Tickle-U preschool programming block, with voice actors from Canada. The series follows three anthropomorphic fire engines who attend firefighting school.

== Characters ==
- Red (voiced by Jesse Moss) is a red fire engine and the main character in the show who never gives up. He loves nature and the outdoors but most of all, he loves making new friends. Sometimes, he is the leader of the firetruck team. The episode "New Truck on the Block" reveals his first day in Green Meadows. His catchphrase is "The sirens say help's on the way!"
- Petrol (voiced by Michael Adamthwaite) is an orange fire engine from Scotland who is sometimes afraid but manages to find the courage inside himself. According to his song "I'm Petrol the Fire Truck", he came before Crabby and Red did.
- Crabby (voiced by Richard Cox) is a grumpy yellow fire engine who sometimes complains about his job and who likes the "great indoors" better than the outdoors but sometimes enjoys the outdoors.
- The Chief (voiced by Ron Halder) is the dark blue fire engine who is the leader of the three junior firetrucks (Red, Petrol, and Crabby). He tells them exactly what to do at any given time. He sometimes puts Red in charge of the team and sometimes leads the team whenever an emergency occurs.
- Mayor Precious Primly (voiced by Ellen Kennedy) is the mayor who runs Green Meadows and works for The Chief.
- Stinky Bins (voiced by David "Squatch" Ward) is the green garbage truck of Green Meadows. He is used to his own stench but sometimes takes a bath, resulting in pollution that has to be cleaned up by the firetrucks. He also likes telling jokes, as seen in "Stinky Bubbles".
- Snooty-Tootie (voiced by Colin Murdock) is a black limo who carries the Mayor around Green Meadows. He once taught the junior firetrucks manners.
- Spinner (voiced by David A. Kaye) is an orange helicopter who often doesn't take his job seriously.
- Scoop is a white seaplane who carries water which she can use to douse fires.
- Bubba (voiced by Blu Mankuma) is a yellow bulldozer who works outside the firehouse.
- Milkie (voiced by Cathy Weseluck) is a white ice cream truck who likes to give ice cream to the children.
- Wiser (voiced by French Tickner) is a dark red mobile crane who can lift people from fires. He first appeared in "Older But Wiser". He also narrates all the stories.
- Tug (voiced by Michael Dobson) is a red and yellow fireboat who is ready to rescue.
- Bulky (voiced by Terry Klassen) is a blue blimp who had been decorated for Halloween. He appeared in the episodes "Spinner Spins a Tale" and "Hoppin' Hoses".
- Zoe is a red tow truck who likes helping other cars.
- Lorrie is a light blue Land Rover who lives in the beach and is Petrol's old friend. She first appeared in "The Lorrie Story".
- Newsie is a blue news truck who likes filming. He first appeared in "Trucks on TV".
- Squirt is the firehouse Dalmatian.

== Production and background ==
Firehouse Tales was originally produced by Firehouse Productions, LLC as a 22-minute pilot, created and developed by animation producer Sidney J. Bailey and animation director Clark James. It was sold to Warner Bros. Television in 2004, which following their process, the program was redeveloped as a CG program composited over 2D backgrounds – 26 half hours were subsequently produced by Warner Bros. Animation and aired on Cartoon Network's Tickle-U worldwide.

The original pilot episodes, which never aired publicly, was created as practical miniature sets with computer generated facial expressions added in post production. The original characters cast were: "Pete", "Lakie", "Tip", "Commander", and "Chief McSpeed", while Wiser and Squirt have different designs.

A licensing deal with Bandai to make toys for the North American market based on the series was announced in late 2005, promising playthings centered around the series's truck characters to launch in the spring of 2006 and to be followed by toys with music and sound and finally "playsets, construction toys, and bath toys."

Companion books were published by Scholastic and Simon and Schuster's Simon Scribbles imprint.

== Broadcast ==
Firehouse Tales premiered on Cartoon Network's preschool television programming block Tickle-U in the United States on August 22, 2005. It also aired on Cartoonito in the UK from 2006. It has also aired on Star Channel's Starland (formerly Star Toons) block in Greece, RTL Klub in Hungary, RTP2 in Portugal, and more channels in other foreign countries.

== Critical reception ==
In the Chicago Tribune, Diana Dawson wrote that the network had "done an impressive job creating children's programming that is laughable without being deplorable" and which "offer underlying messages of cooperation, teamwork, compassion and problem-solving." She added, however, that "Cartoon Network has added to the strong preschool programming that exists, but not created anything that stands apart."

About two weeks later also in the Chicago Tribune, Maureen Ryan, watching with her 3-year-old son Sean, found that "on the whole, the shows [in the Tickle U block] seemed to hit the preschool demographic squarely." She added that, "Anything that involves talking firetrucks is going to get a positive reaction from Sean."

Writing for the Dallas Morning News, Jeanne Spreier noted the role of Alice Cahn, formerly an executive at Sesame Workshop and PBS, in developing the shows. Cartoon Network's description of the show's educational purpose was glossed by Spreier as "lofty speak for making sure kids get a laugh out of what they watch, and at the same time making sure what they watch isn't objectionable." She judged, "No one's going to be offended by any of these vignettes, and preschoolers -- and their parents -- will get a laugh..."

For the Wall Street Journal, John Jurgensen screened the show for a high school principal and his four-year-old son. The joke "What has four wheels and flies? ... a garbage truck!" didn't draw a laugh from the child, but he reportedly "liked what he saw," saying "'That firetruck looks like mine.'"
