= Troll Tales =

Animated television show

Troll Tales is a Danish-German animated series from 2000 based on the books of Henning Kure. It involves three young trolls called Snapper, Tumbler and Willy Wee.

The series has been dubbed into English, German, Danish, Swedish, Norwegian, Finnish, Hungarian, Russian and Dutch. It aired in Scandinavia on Cartoon Network, Boomerang and DR1, in Germany on ZDF and KiKA, in Hungary on Duna TV and in Belgium on Ketnet. All music was composed, performed and produced by John Mitchell and Tom Keenlyside at Anitunes Music Inc.

All episodes were released on DVD in Russia with Russian and English audio tracks.

== Plot ==
Join the adventures of the three young trolls Snapper, Tumbler, and Willy Wee, as they explore the magical Troll forest and in their own unique way - make sure that the elves, nixes and other faerie folk will never forget (not forgive them). The Trolls are an anarchistic lot, always on the lookout for fun. They never realise what havoc they wreak, nor do they care. They are mischievous but harmless. Everyone in the magical forest knows our three heroes by the pranks they play and the adventures they share.

== Episodes ==
1. Soap Opera
2. The Hunt
3. The Lord of the Stones
4. The Princess
5. The Baby-Sitters
6. Farm Boys
7. The Mermaid
8. Say Cheese!
9. Pocket Storm
10. Huldra's Revenge
11. False Alarm
12. Where's the Wolf
13. One Cold Fish
14. The Bride of the Nix
15. Wrathrag's Request
16. The Changelings
17. The Wand
18. Huldra's Nightmare
19. The Bog Hag
20. Three Wishes
21. The Highway Man
22. The Trouble with Trolls
23. In a Dragon's Breath
24. The Professor
25. Sunsick
26. The Uninvited

== Characters ==
=== Snapper ===
Voiced by Kathleen Barr. Snapper is a rather scrawny, barefoot, troll child from a forest filled of magic creatures. He is generally pretty disliked by just about everyone in the forest due to the constant pranks he plays on anyone he comes across. He is very cunning (although he might seem dumb, as he cannot even count to two!). He is also a master at every kind of music instrument he learns the basics off (He learned to play violin like a pro just like "Snap!"), but favours the flute. While he generally doesn't care about the consequences of his actions, he often resolves bad situations he played a part in instigating. He has a little troll named Willy Wee living in his hat. He has a really big ego. Unlike the other trolls, Snapper goes barefoot.

=== Tumbler ===
Voiced by Cathy Weseluck. Tumbler is a fat little troll child. He is rather dull and mostly just tags along with Snapper, agrees with him, when he compliments himself, and takes part in his pranks. He is rather shy.

=== Willy Wee ===
Willy Wee is a naked nano-troll (a tiny troll). He doesn't like any of the creatures in the forest that much, except Snapper, Sun-Eye, Tim, and Huldra.

=== Supporting characters ===
==== Huldra ====
Voiced by Lalainia Lindbjerg. Huldra is a (self-appointed, the other vittlings doesn't thinks she's ready yet, "The Hunt doesn't call her") huntress of the Vittling Folk (They seem to be some kind of troll-elfish creatures...). Huldra is the laughing stock of her tribe, being kinda clumsy (while still being just as agile as any other vittling), and short-thinking sometimes, as well as being one of Snappers main targets for pranks. She yearns to prove that she can be just as good a hunter as the adult Vittlings (though she is a kid). She seems to have some kind of liking for Snapper, as she enjoyed kissing him just to see his reaction, as well getting pretty jealous when a mermaid flirted with him.

==== Scuttlebutt ====
Huldra's pet moose/elk. He is very gluttonous and has a sweet tooth. He is also rather dumb.

==== Trollmum ====
A troll woman who desperately wants children and will even steal human children.

==== Gnarlyconk ====
Voiced by Michael Dobson. Gnarlyconk is a short-tempered troll who is Snapper's nemesis.

==== Flobbergob ====
Voiced By Scott McNeil. One of the trolls.

==== Rumbletum ====
Voiced by Michael Dobson. Rumbletum is a dim-witted troll. He has a problem of passing gas.

==== Wrathrag ====
The resident troll witch. She makes and mixes potions in her hallow tree. She has a pet owl that acts as her eyes.

==== Strix ====
Wrathrag's giant owl companion.

=== Antagonists ===
==== The Wolf ====
A creature who seeks to devour the hero

==== The Nix ====
Voiced by Michael Dobson. An aquatic spirit feared by many of the forest's inhabitants. He dwells in a castle in the lake. He enchants people with false promises and wishes so that he can keep them there forever.

==== The Mara ====
A wicked demon that spreads nightmares.

==== The Mermaid ====
A beautiful creature from the sea. She gets lost in the troll river and falls in love with Snapper. After she successfully seduced Snapper, she transformed him into a sea troll.
