= Jason Moss (writer) =

American writer and attorney (1975-2006)

- Born: Jason Michael Moss; February 3, 1975; Bethpage, New York, U.S.
- Died: June 6, 2006 (aged 31); Henderson, Nevada, U.S.
- Education: University of Nevada, Las Vegas; University of Michigan Law School
- Occupations: Attorney, writer
- Known for: The Last Victim
- Spouse: Charlotte Moss

Jason Michael Moss (February 3, 1975 – June 6, 2006) was an American attorney who specialized in criminal defense. He was best known as the author of The Last Victim: A True-Life Journey into the Mind of the Serial Killer (1999), a memoir about his exploration of the minds of incarcerated serial killers, which started as a research project in college. He corresponded and conducted personal interviews with several notorious killers.

Struggling with depression, Moss died by suicide in 2006. His book was adapted and produced as a film, Dear Mr. Gacy, released in 2010.

== Personal life ==
Moss was born in Bethpage, New York, in 1975 and attended local schools. He graduated summa cum laude from the University of Nevada, Las Vegas. As an honors student, he had completed a research project into the minds of serial killers by establishing correspondence with them and gaining interviews. At the age of 19, he met twice with John Wayne Gacy in prison, less than two months before the killer was executed. Shaken by the experience, in which he felt psychologically manipulated, Moss had nightmares. He wrote a book about his project and its effects, co-authored with counseling professor Jeffrey Kottler, and published in 1999 as The Last Victim: A True-Life Journey into the Mind of the Serial Killer.

After college, Moss served internships with the U.S. Secret Service and the Bureau of Alcohol, Tobacco, and Firearms. He decided to go into law and graduated in 2002 from University of Michigan Law School. He set up a criminal defense practice in Henderson, Nevada. He was married to Charlotte Moss.

== The Last Victim ==
While writing his honors thesis at UNLV, Moss established relationships with convicted, imprisoned serial killers John Wayne Gacy, Elmer Wayne Henley, Richard Ramirez, Henry Lee Lucas, Jeffrey Dahmer, and Charles Manson. He conducted research in order to learn what would most appeal to each of his subjects, and adopted the role of disciple, admirer, surrogate, or potential victim as necessary. He initiated the relationships through correspondence. According to Kottler, Moss studied devil worship and Satanic rituals before contacting Ramirez.

Moss later said that he formed the strongest relationship with Gacy. Their exchange of letters led to regular Sunday morning phone calls, during which Gacy reiterated his innocence. In his book, Moss explored the development of his correspondence with Gacy, shortly before the killer was executed. Moss asserted that he became Gacy's "last victim" during their face-to-face meeting. While he understood that he had deliberately lured Gacy, he felt overpowered and manipulated by him, in the same way that he might have manipulated and controlled his victims. Moss felt that his overall experience allowed him to gain an understanding of how a serial killer's mind works.

=== Reception ===
Moss's book quickly became a bestseller. In 2000 a paperback edition was released, and also made the New York Times bestseller list. A film adaptation of the book, Dear Mr. Gacy, was released in 2010, starring Jesse Moss (no relation) and William Forsythe.

== Suicide ==
Jason Moss died from a self-inflicted gunshot wound to the head in his Henderson, Nevada home on the morning of June 6, 2006. The significance, if any, of his chosen suicide date (6/6/06) has been the subject of speculation. According to his co-author Kottler, Moss reportedly had delved "heavily into Satanic stuff" while researching material to prepare for his correspondence with serial killers and while writing his book, but sounded upbeat in their last conversation before his death.
